= Sywert van Lienden =

Dutch entrepreneur and political activist

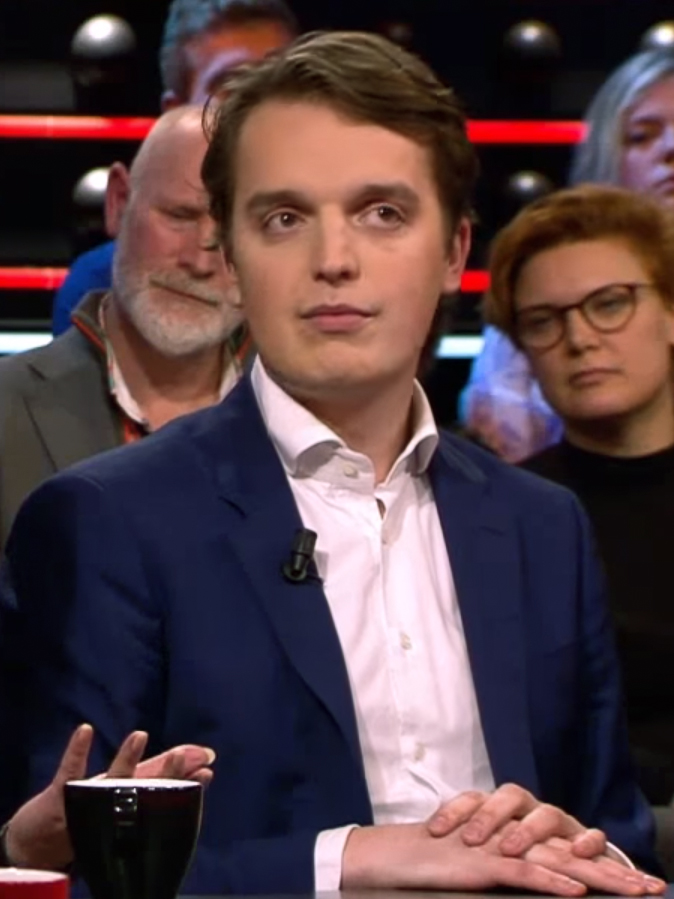
- Sywert van Lienden in 2017
- Born: Sywert Hiryus van Lienden; September 18, 1990 (age 36); Rhenen, Netherlands
- Education: University of Amsterdam
- Known for: entrepreneurship, leadership of Landelijk Aktie Komitee Scholieren, founding G500, mask affair
- Political party: CDA (until June 2021)
- Children: 2

Sywert Hiryus van Lienden (born 18 September 1990) is a Dutch entrepreneur, political activist and lobbyist. He was chairman of the Landelijk Aktie Komitee Scholieren (LAKS) and initiator of the political youth movement G500. Later, he frequently made the news because of his actions during the COVID-19 pandemic as head of the Stichting Hulptroepen Alliantie.

== Early life ==
Sywert van Lienden was born on 18 September 1990. He grew up in Rhenen and Ermelo, as the middle child in a Catholic family with two sisters. After primary school, Van Lienden attended the Stedelijk Gymnasium Johan van Oldenbarnevelt in Amersfoort. After a few difficult years, he continued his studies at the Christelijk College Groevenbeek in Ermelo. He was unable to find his footing there as well, and on the advice of the school, he contacted the Landelijk Aktie Komitee Scholieren (LAKS). Subsequently, Van Lienden attended the Barlaeus Gymnasium in Amsterdam, where he dropped out after a few weeks. He eventually passed his secondary school state exams in 2009.

Between 2010 and 2013, Van Lienden studied Political Science, Law, European Studies, and Economics at the University of Amsterdam. According to Van Lienden himself, he completed his Political Science and European Studies degrees, but according to other sources he completed none of the four.

== Student leader ==
In November 2007, as LAKS chairman, he led the Dutch pupil strike against the 1040-hour standard in Dutch secondary education, which brought him national recognition. In 2007, he served as an independent member of the youth panel of the Social and Economic Council.

In April 2012, Van Lienden publicly announced the formation of G500, a youth movement that aimed to reform Dutch politics from within on the television programme Buitenhof. G500 quickly grew to over a thousand members, all of whom had joined the People's Party for Freedom and Democracy (VVD), Christian Democratic Appeal (CDA), and Labour Party (PvdA). At the political congresses of these parties, G500 members attempted to influence their party manifestos for the 2012 Dutch general election. However, G500's success was limited and the movement died a quiet death after 2012.

== Pundit and lobbyist ==
Van Lienden has written as a columnist for, among others, PAUZE Magazine in 2008, HP/De Tijd (in 2009 and 2010) and nrc.next in July 2012. Van Lienden was a guest political commentator on the television program De Wereld Draait Door several times and contributed to the radio program De Nieuws BV. In January 2016, Van Lienden made a statement on De Wereld Draait Door that "one in twenty to one in thirty" people of foreign origin are suspected of sexual offenses. He later retracted this claim.

From 2017, he was employed by the Amsterdam municipal government as policy advisor and lobbyist. After a year, he went on sick leave due to a concussion. While on sick leave, Van Lienden renovated his house, gave interviews, started training to become a director, and served on the committee for the CDA's election manifesto.

== Mask affair ==
At the start of the COVID-19 pandemic in 2020, Van Lienden spoke out about the shortage of face masks and other protective equipment for healthcare workers via social media. Together with two acquaintances (Bernd Damme and Camille van Gestel), he founded the non-profit organization "Stichting Hulptroepen Alliantie", which purchased face masks from factories in China with the financial assistance of various companies and financiers.

In May 2021, De Volkskrant reported that Van Lienden and his partners were making a lot of money by reselling the face masks to the government through a private limited company linked to the non-profit organization, despite repeated public statements that they were not making any profit from it themselves. The National Institute for Public Health and the Environment (RIVM) advised against the purchase because there would be an "unacceptable health risk", due to the fact that graphene had been found in the face masks. According to the journalism platform Follow the Money, Van Lienden pocketed nine million euros from the deal, while his partners each pocketed about five million euros.

On June 17, 2021, a statement by the CDA and Van Lienden was released stating that he had terminated his membership of the CDA. On December 22, 2021, staffing agency Randstad filed a complaint of fraud against Van Lienden and his two partners. The Fiscal Intelligence and Investigation Service (FIOD) arrested Van Lienden and his two business partners on February 28, 2022, after the Public Prosecution Service had announced earlier that day that it was conducting a criminal investigation into the face mask deal of Stichting Hulptroepen Alliantie and the three individuals involved, including Van Lienden. This investigation took place following the complaint filed by staffing agency Randstad in late December 2021. On March 2, 2022, Van Lienden and his partners were released after questioning. In July, the Amsterdam District Court mandated the dismissal of Van Lienden and his partner Damme as directors of the foundation, after which they appealed. The hearing was scheduled for April 13, 2023, but Van Lienden withdrew due to "incidents in the private sphere."

On April 29, 2022, the Public Prosecution Service announced it had seized the Dutch bank accounts of the key players in the face mask affair, for a total amount of over 11.5 million euros. The charges against the board of Stichting Hulptroepen Alliantie (SHA) were then expanded to include embezzlement. In August of that year, that amount was increased to 18 million euros. The foundation's new board announced on April 13, 2023, that it would recover 21.5 million euros from the face mask deal and 350,000 euros in declared legal fees from Van Lienden and his partners Damme and Van Gestel. In October 2023, the Dutch State sued the company Relief Goods Alliance, a civil procedure separate from the criminal investigation by the Public Prosecution Service. In civil proceedings, the judge ruled in February 2025 that the three partners must pay SHA 20.7 million euros in damages.
