= Drie, Gelderland =

Drie
- Hamlet
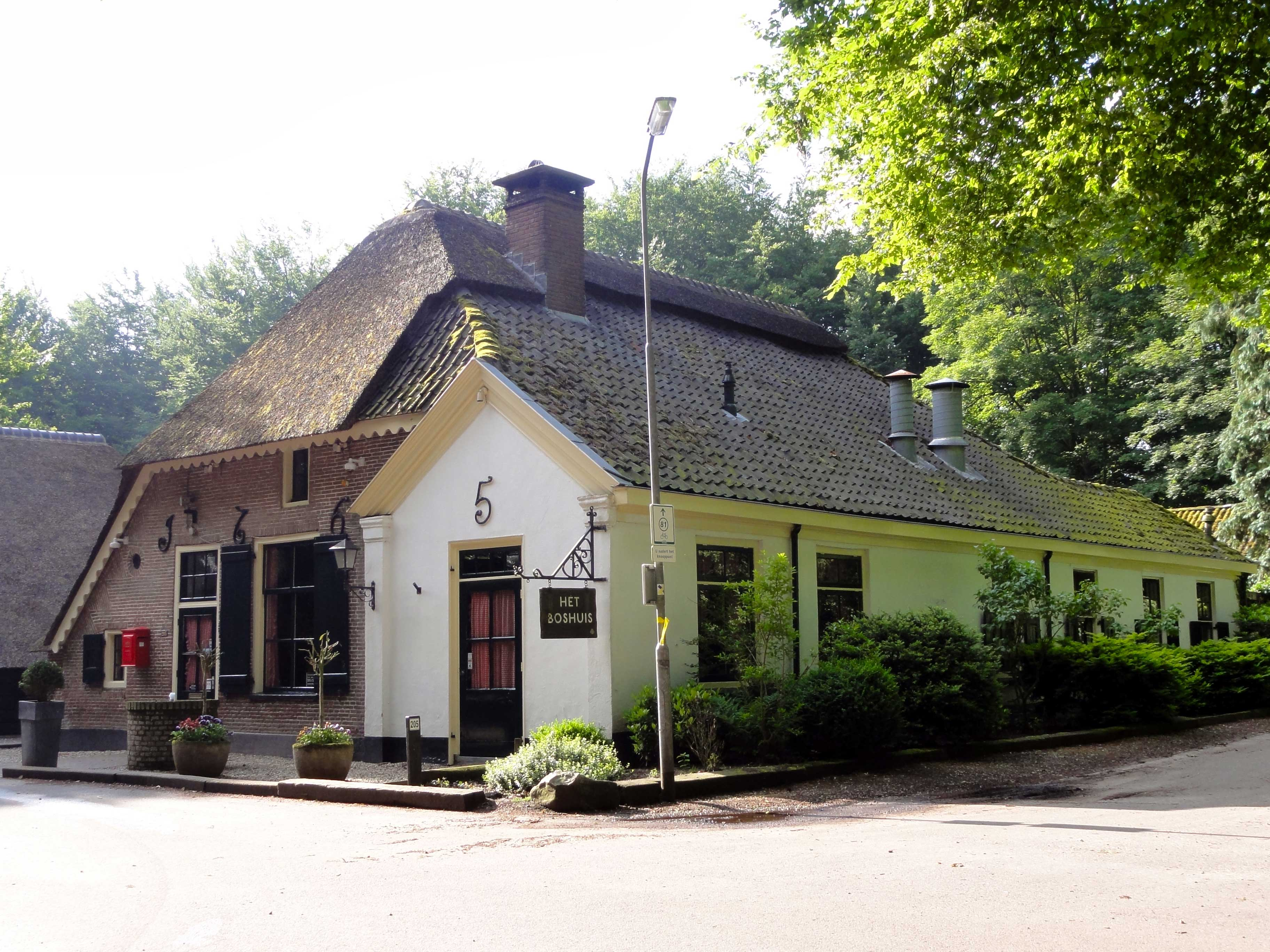
- The Boshuis (Forest House) Drie

- Location in the Netherlands Drie (Netherlands)
- Coordinates: 52.2647°N 5.6781°E
- Country: Netherlands
- Province: Gelderland
- Municipality: Ermelo

Area
  - Total: 5.33 km^{2} (2.06 sq mi)
- Elevation: 16 m (52 ft)
- Time zone: UTC+1 (CET)
  - Summer (DST): UTC+2 (CEST)
- Postal code: 3852
- Dialing code: 0341

Drie is a hamlet in the municipality of Ermelo in the province of Gelderland, the Netherlands. Drie, near Ermelo and Speuld, is situated in the forest.

It was first mentioned in 855 as Thri, and probably means three houses. It is not a statistical entity, and the postal authorities have placed it under Ermelo. In 1840, it was home to 28 people. Nowadays it has a handful of houses.
