= Ermelo =

Ermelo may refer to:

- Ermelo, Mpumalanga, town in South Africa
- Ermelo, Netherlands, a municipality and a town in the Netherlands, in the province of Gelderland
- Ermelo (Arcos de Valdevez), parish in Arcos de Valdevez Municipality, Portugal
- Ermelo (Mondim de Basto), parish in Mondim de Basto Municipality, Portugal
- Roman Ermelo, a Roman marching camp found near Ermelo, Netherlands
