= Eva and Abraham Beem =

Dutch Jewish Holocaust victims

Eva Beem
- Born: 21 May 1932; Leeuwarden, the Netherlands
- Died: 6 March 1944 (aged 11); Auschwitz-Birkenau, German-occupied Poland
- Cause of death: gassed to death
- Known for: gassed to death along with her brother Abraham in Auschwitz

Abraham Beem
- Born: 3 June 1934; Leeuwarden, the Netherlands
- Died: 6 March 1944 (aged 9); Auschwitz concentration camp, General Government
- Cause of death: gassed to death
- Known for: gassed to death along with his sister Eva in Auschwitz

Eva and Abraham Beem were Dutch Jewish siblings and victims of the Holocaust in the Netherlands. They had been given new identities with a Christian family in an attempt to evade deportation by the Nazis, but were discovered and deported to Auschwitz concentration camp. They were murdered in the gas chamber upon their arrival on 6 March 1944.

== Biography ==
Eva (born 21 May 1932) and Abraham (born 13 June 1934) Beem were born in Leeuwarden, in the northern Netherlands. Their father, Hartog Beem, was a German teacher, and their mother was Rosette Beem. Both parents were Jews, and active in the Jewish community.

When Nazi Germany invaded the country in 1940, the Nazis started to separate the Jews from the general population and prohibited them from working. The Beem parents, realizing that they were in danger, decided to go into hiding. Eva and her younger brother Abraham were sent to the town of Ermelo to live with a Christian family. They were given new identities: Abraham was given the name Jan de Witt and Eva was Linni de Witt. They attended the local school, and were able to send letters (albeit in code) to their parents.

By 1944, the Nazis realized that Jewish children were being sent into hiding in rural villages. They found that some people were willing, in return for payment, to reveal hiding places of Jewish children. In February 1944, four Dutch policemen raided the home where the children were being housed, and after forcing Abraham to undress to reveal that he was circumcised, arrested them. The children were deported to the Auschwitz concentration camp and murdered in the gas chambers immediately upon arrival. Eva was 11 years old and Abraham was 9.

The children's father and mother survived the Holocaust; they were not told of their children's deaths until after the war. Eva and Abraham's story was first published in 1988 by Teake Zijlstra, a journalist at the Leeuwarder Courant. The surviving policeman was spared the death penalty because he was deemed to have acted in the line of duty.

The Beem children's story is on display at the Hollandsche Schouwburg (Dutch Theater) Holocaust memorial in Amsterdam; this location served as a transit station for Jews being deported after July 1942, as well as in the Dutch Resistance Museum, a part of the Fries Museum in Leeuwarden.
