= Roman Ermelo =

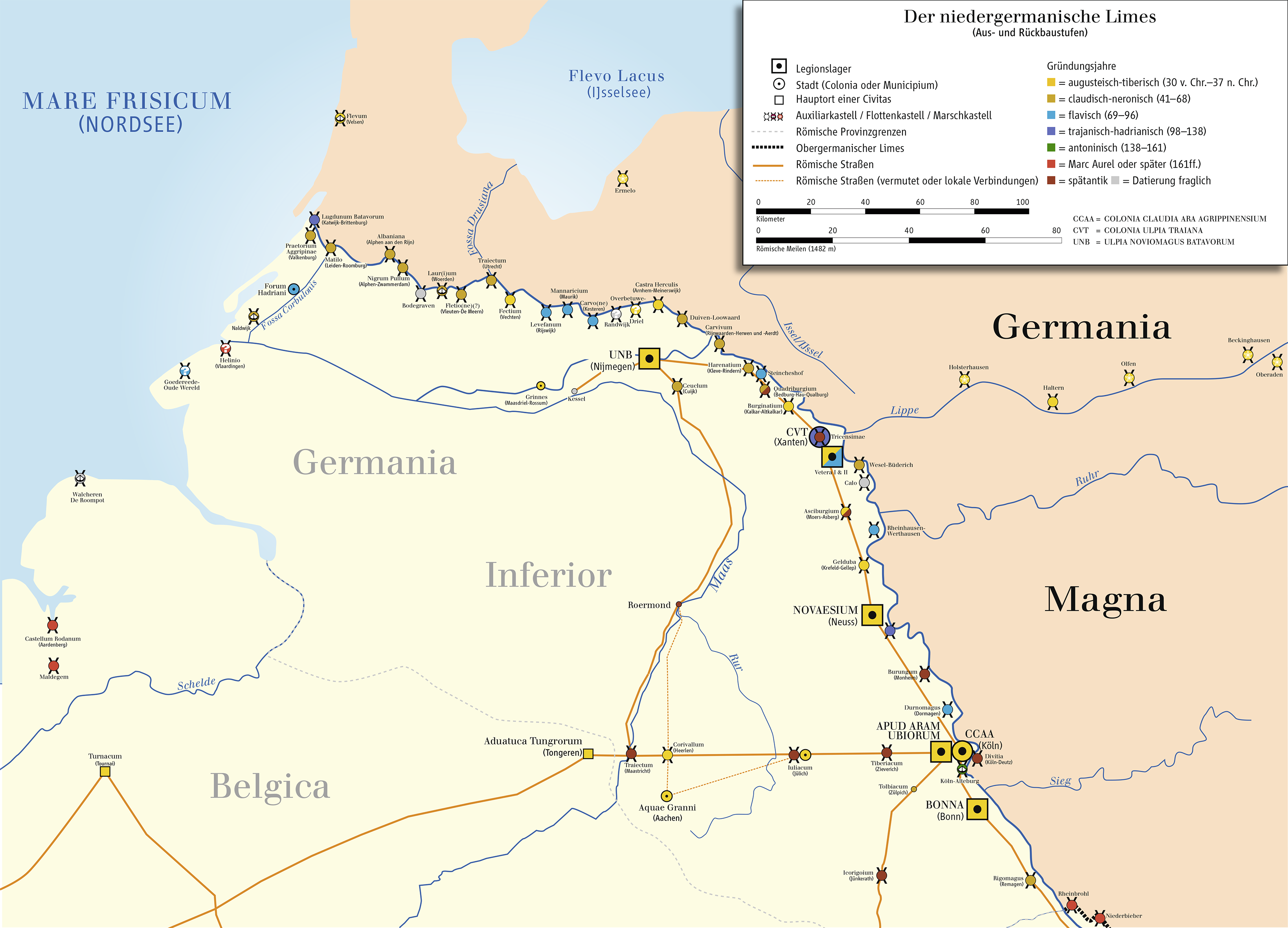
Map showing Ermelo, north of the Rhine river.

Roman Ermelo was a big roman camp (and possible fortification) in what is now Netherland. It was created under Augustus in the short-lived roman province of Germania.

== History ==
A Roman marching camp has been found on the push moraine east of Ermelo: Roman camp Ermelo. It has been found together with a smaller one. They were far in hostile territory for the Romans, on the route between the Limes and the ancient Lake Flevo.

The largest camp of 6 hectares offered space for 4000-6000 legionaries. The diamond-shaped earthen defensive walls of this marching camp can still be partly seen in the landscape and were partly restored in 2006. A second smaller camp was not found until 2017. In 2020, excavations confirmed that it was of Roman origin.

== See also ==
- Flevum
- Aliso
- Stockstadt Roman Fort

== Bibliography ==
- Julianus Egidius Bogaers: Ermelo. In: Julianus Egidius Bogaers, Christoph B. Rüger: Der Niedergermanische Limes. Materialien zu seiner Geschichte. Rheinland-Verlag, Köln 1974, ISBN 3-7927-0194-4, S. 33–35.
- Saskia G. van Dockum: Das niederländische Flussgebiet. In: Tilmann Bechert, Willem J. H. Willems (Hrsg.): Die römische Reichsgrenze zwischen Mosel und Nordseeküste. Theiss, Stuttgart 1995, ISBN 3-8062-1189-2, S. 79.
