= Stockstadt Roman Fort =

Roman fort at the Upper Germanic-Rhaetian Limes

Stockstadt Fort
- Kastell Stockstadt (German)
- Interactive map of Stockstadt Fort
- 49°58′38.6″N 9°4′2.5″E
- Type: Cohort fort
- Associated with: Cohors III Aquitanorum equitata c.R., Coh. II Hispanorum eq. p. f., Coh. I Aquitanorum veterana eq.
- Location: Stockstadt am Main
- Region: Germania Superior
- Part of: Upper Germanic-Rhaetian Limes

History
- Built: around 90 CE
- Abandoned: around 260 CE

Site notes
- Material: a) Wood/soil b) Stone fort
- Elevation: 115 m (377 ft)
- Area: 3.25 ha (8.0 acres)
- Condition: Ground monument not visible
- 1. Recorded in ORL 33 (RLK).; 2. Altitude as above NHN.; 3. Neighboured by Seligenstadt fort to the northwest and Fort Niedernberg to the southeast.

Stockstadt Fort is a former Roman fort located in Stockstadt am Main in the district of Aschaffenburg in Lower Franconia. Following several years of excavations, mainly in the early 20th century, evidence was uncovered indicating the existence of a fort complex comprising two previously documented predecessor buildings, as well as a succession of different troops stationed there. From the early period of the Upper Germanic-Raetian Limes to the fall of the Limes, Stockstadt was therefore an important military camp on the Main Limes, the so-called Wet Limes. The site is of significant archaeological interest due to the large number of stone monuments that have been discovered, particularly in the vicus area, which encompasses two mithrae, a Jupiter Dolichenus sanctuary and a beneficiarius station.

== Location ==
Stockstadt is situated in a convenient location in proximity to the confluence of the Gersprenz river into the Main river (Moenus). In addition to its function as a border, the river was of significant importance for the supply of the forts situated along the Wet Limes. Given that the Gersprenz was also used for shipping in Roman times, possibly with smaller barges, it is probable that it was an important transfer point. The presence of a beneficiarius station and other stone monuments from Roman times provides evidence of this. The Civitas capital of Dieburg could be reached via the Gersprenz. The discovery of a boat hook in Groß-Bieberau provides evidence that the river was utilised for a considerable distance into the valleys of the Odenwald.

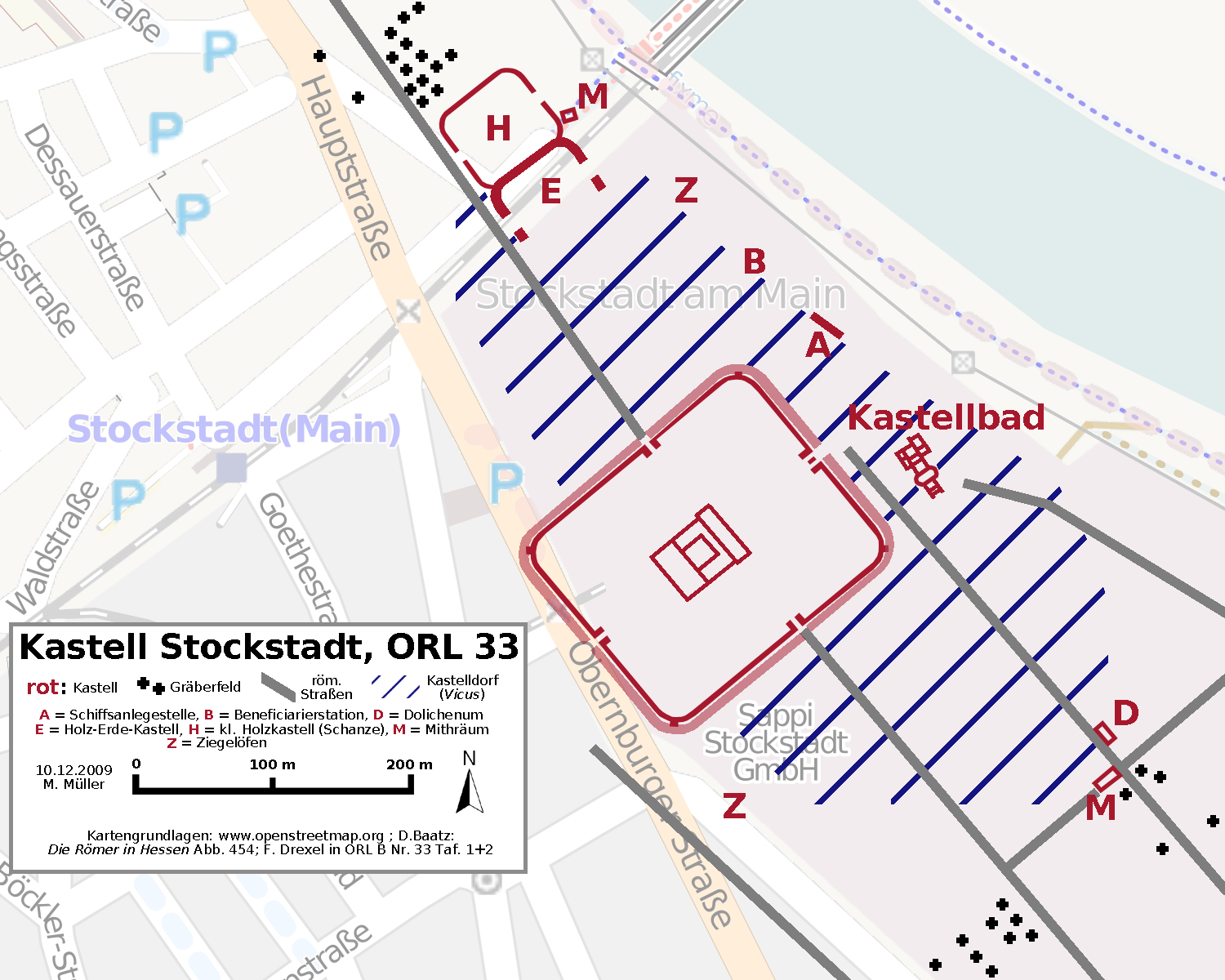
Site plan of the fortifications in Stockstadt am Main

An early Roman road, the existence of which is evidenced by the discovery of significant remains in the form of the Bickenbach marsh bridge at the small fort of Allmendfeld, initially connected the West Gate with Gernsheim on the Rhine. The subsequent establishment of the principal settlement at Dieburg served to reinforce the significance of this connection to the West. However, there is no evidence of it in the immediate vicinity of the fort. The main settlement axis of the fort village was located along the Roman road leading from north-west to south-east. This road connected Stockstadt with the neighbouring forts of Seligenstadt (north-west) and Niedernberg (south-east). It ran parallel to the Main Limes. Furthermore, the route was also traversed in the vicinity of the fort on several occasions.

The Roman military encampment was situated to the south of the current residential development, occupying both sides of the Rhine-Main railway between Stockstadt station and the River Main. The distance from the river was between 160 and 200 metres. The distance from the high bank to the site was approximately 75 metres. The area has been entirely redeveloped with industrial facilities, and no trace of the ancient sites remains.

== History ==
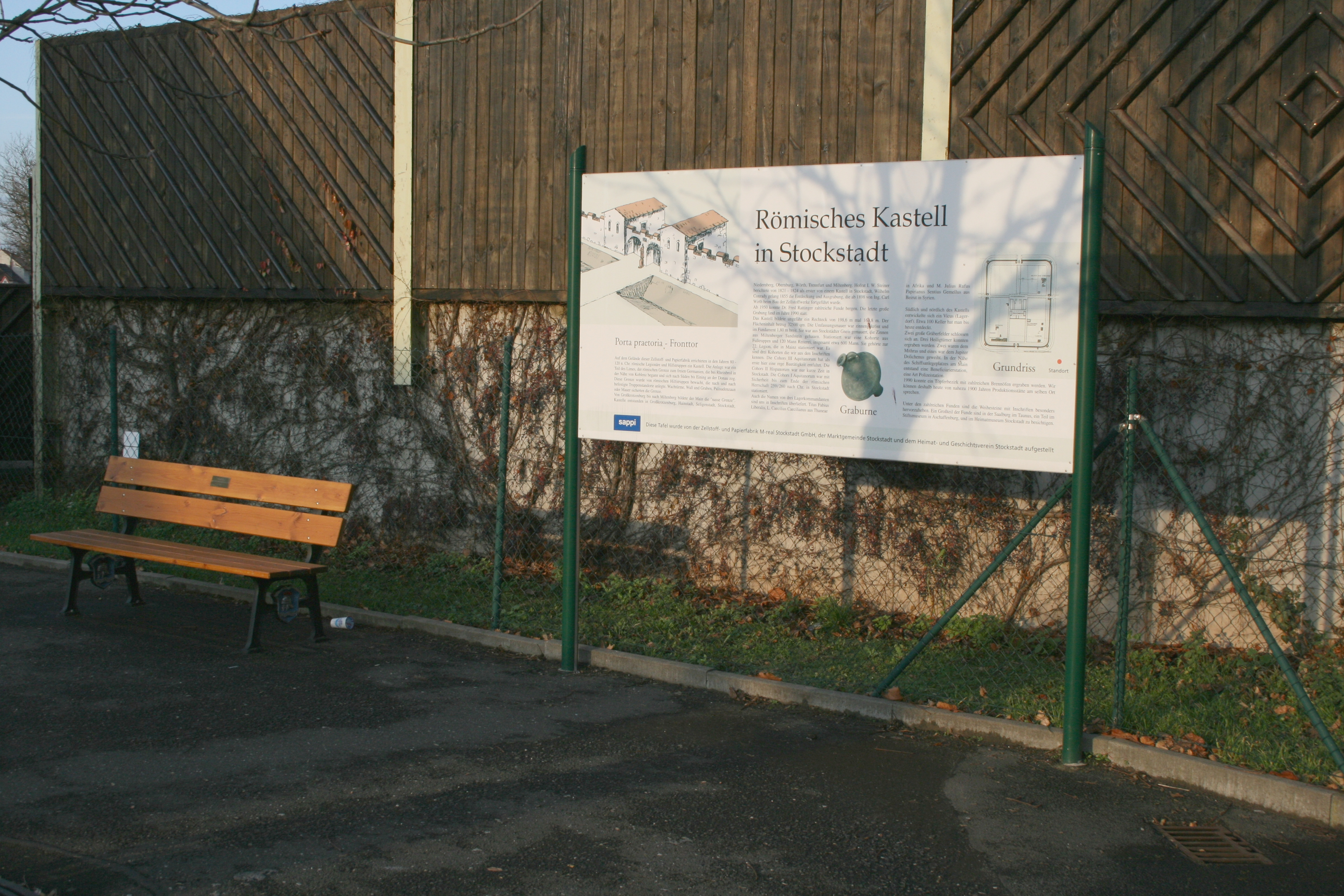
Information board near the fort today.

The Stockstadt forts represent the most extensively researched of all the Roman military sites on the Main Limes. This has provided a clear chronological sequence of the various fort complexes and the troop units stationed here. It is uncertain whether the frequent change of cohorts was a distinctive feature of the fort at Stockstadt or whether it occurred at other sites in the Limes region. The numerous remains, particularly the stone monuments bearing the names of the troop units, provide a coherent picture of the chronological sequence of events at the Stockstadt site. Although there are also features of chronologically consecutive fort complexes from some military sites in the region, the source situation concerning the units stationed there is generally poor in comparison to Stockstadt.

The chronology of the Stockstadt fortifications is likely to commence with a small redoubt situated to the north of the railway line. This was soon replaced by the first wood and earth fort, which was only partially excavated. A limited number of stratified finds were recovered from both sites. It can be surmised that the later parts of the vicus (camp village) overlapped the early forts. The evidence indicates that the initial garrison was not established before 90 CE. However, a more recent analysis of the coin series suggests that it was only between 100 and 110 CE. The function as predecessors of the Stockstadt redoubts to the fort has been subject to recent debate.

It is possible that the sparsely documented wood-and-earth fort served as a construction site for the larger cohort fort to the southeast, which was probably built around 100 AD. Together with the Balineum (fort baths), it is dated to the early Trajanic period. In addition to the small finds, the stamped bricks from the bath building were of particular significance in establishing the dating. A total of 122 of the 126 bricks exhibited a stamp of Legio XXII Primigenia. The remaining four bricks had likely been used during a repair and bore the much later stamps of the Cohors IIII Vindelicorum (4th Cohort of the Vindelics) from the Großkrotzenburg fort down the Main. The brick stamps of the 22nd Legion are referred to by researchers as the Stockstadt group. The bricks are dated to a period shortly after the legion was transferred to Mogontiacum (Mainz) around 93 AD. This group of stamp types is of significant importance for the dating of numerous other fortifications on the Upper Germanic Limes, including the forts of Marköbel and Ober-Florstadt, the fort baths of Hanau-Salisberg and the fort of Hainstadt.

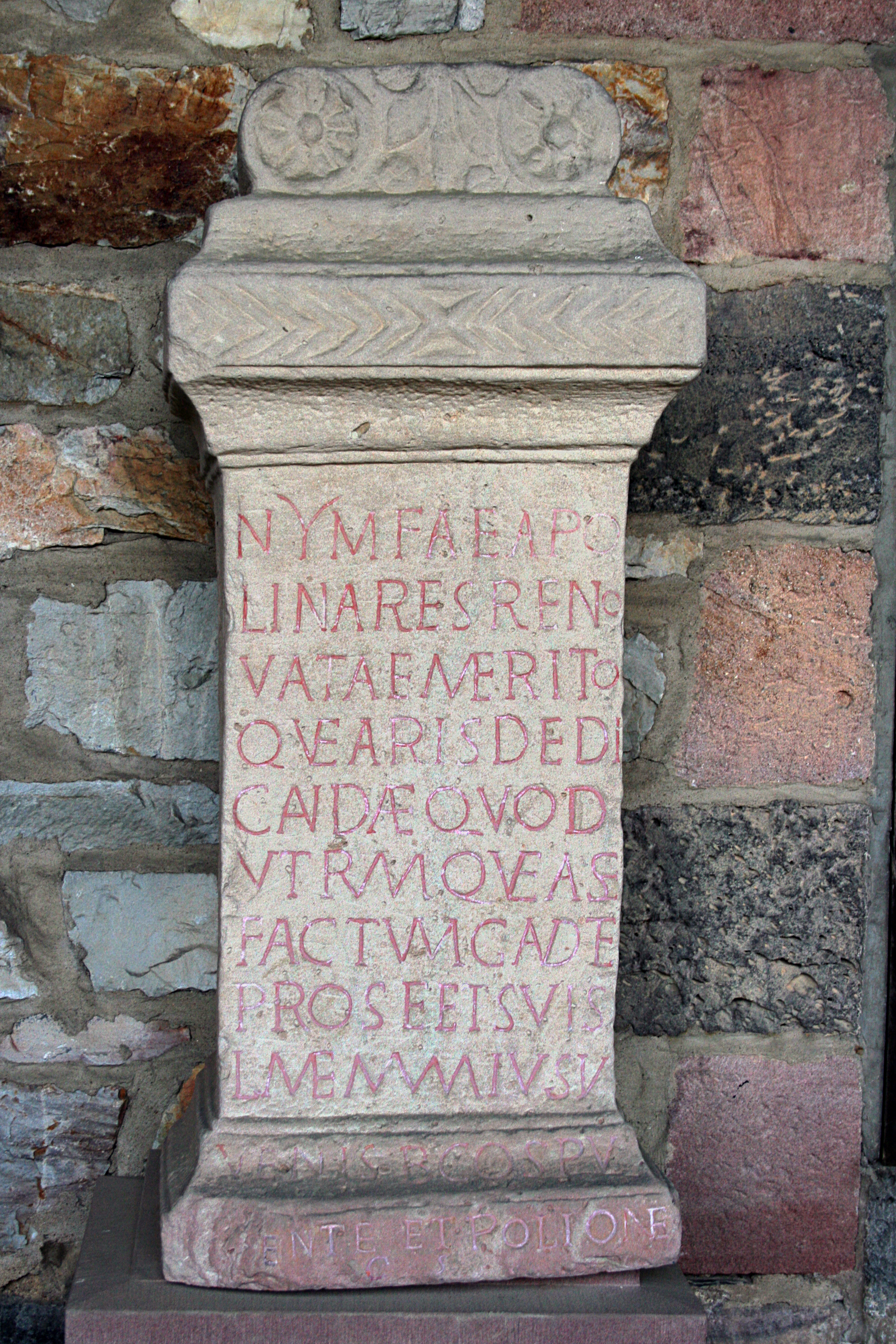
Inscribed reference to a nymph sanctuary from Stockstadt. The stone can be found at Saalburg today.

It is likely that the cohort fort was constructed with a stone defence wall during the reign of Emperor Hadrian. This was accompanied by the development of an extensive camp village to the north and south of it. The establishment of a civil administration (Civitas Auderiensium) with its headquarters in Dieburg was a further factor that favoured the location economically. A landing stage for ships was built on the Main and a beneficiarius station close by. The significance of the transhipment centre is evident from the dedicatory inscription for Jupiter Dolichenus of a soldier of Legio XXII, who was dispatched to Stockstadt with a lumberjack detachment. The inscription can be dated to the year 214 CE and is one of a series of similar inscriptions found on the Main Limes, for example in Obernburg or Trennfurt.

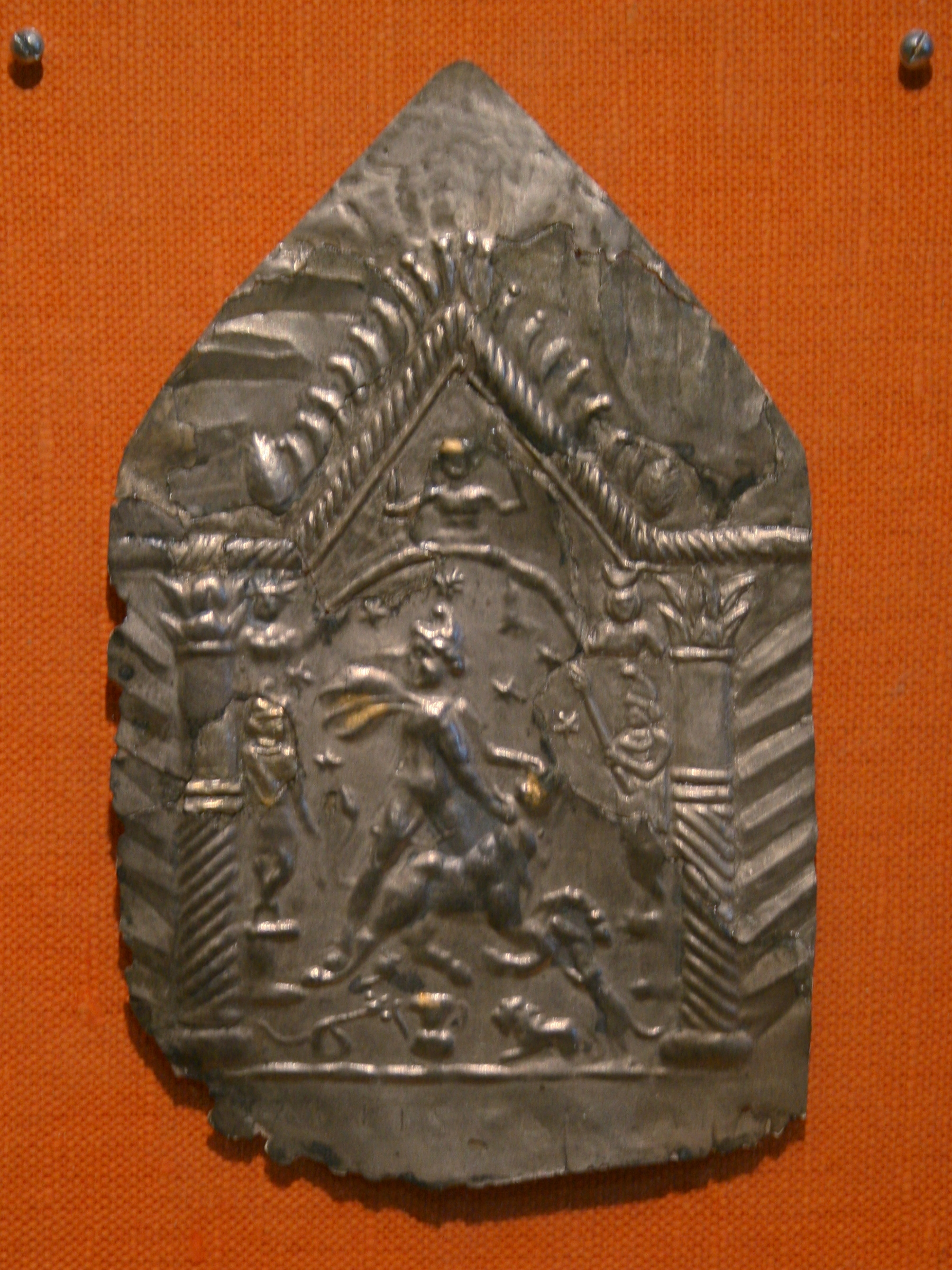
Silver votive plate from the Mithraeum in the Saalburg Museum.

The presence of two mithraeums and a sanctuary for Jupiter Dolichenus provides evidence of oriental cults in Stockstadt during the late second and third centuries. In addition, inscriptions have been discovered which refer to a Fortuna sanctuary and a nymphaeum. The cult of Jupiter Heliopolitanus from Heliopolis (Baalbek), which was relatively uncommon in the north-west provinces, is also documented in the nearby town of Zellhausen. The altar was donated by a prefect of Coh. I Aquitanorum, who hailed from Berytus (Beirut) in the vicinity of Heliopolis, and is believed to have introduced the cult to the region from his homeland. The numerous stone monuments in Stockstadt represent a unique collection of this type on the Upper Germanic-Raetian Limes. The fort and vicus were in existence until the time of the Limesfall in the middle of the 3rd century CE.

Several graves were discovered in the fort area, which are believed to date back to the 4th century CE based on the grave goods found within them. The findings suggest that the area was a frequented by the Alamanni in late antiquity. A similar phenomenon can be observed at the Mainlimes fort sites of Großkrotzenburg and Hainstadt. Nevertheless, the medieval settlement centre of Stockstadt was situated to the north. The fort site remained undeveloped until the time of the Imperial Limes Commission (RLK).

=== Stationed military units ===
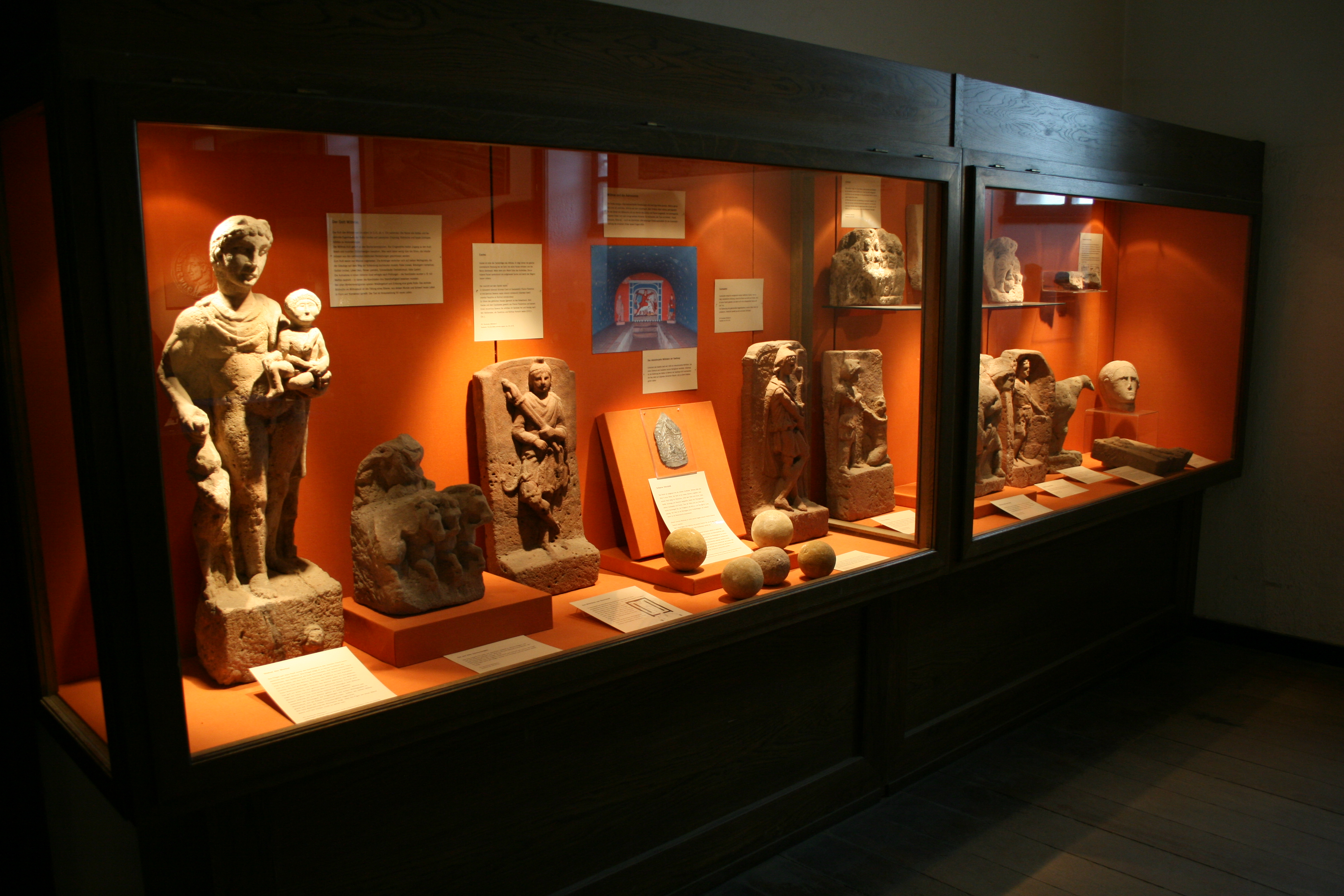
Finds from the Stockstadt Mithraeum, exhibited in the Horreum of the Saalburg Museum

The inscriptions provide evidence of three units in Stockstadt. The presence of stamps on bricks from several buildings of the cohort fort and from two brick kilns provides evidence of the Cohors III Aquitanorum equitata civium Romanorum (3rd part-mounted Aquitanian cohort of Roman citizens). The cohort consisted of 500 men (cohors quingenaria) and an equestrian unit of 120 men, for a total strength of 620 men. The bricks used indicate that this unit was responsible for the construction of the fort, although it is not certain whether it had already been stationed there beforehand.

The cohort was relocated to the Neckarburken fort in the early second century CE. It was replaced by the Coh. Hispanorum eq. pia fidelis (second part-mounted cohort of Spaniards, dutiful and loyal), previously stationed at Fort Wimpfen in the valley. The name of this cohort is inscribed on the gravestone of the soldier Diomedes, an Isaurian by birth, and in the dedicatory inscription of a decurio. Both inscriptions lack a date. The introductory formula [I]n h(onorem) d(omus) d(ivinae) (In honour of the imperial house) of the decurion dedication suggests that it was created in the time of Antoninus Pius, at the earliest.

From the mid-2nd century CE onwards, the Coh. II Hispanorum eq. p. f. can be traced to Fort Heddesdorf, indicating that it was not long in residence in Stockstadt. This unit was replaced by the Coh. I Aquitanorum veterana eq. (1st part-mounted veteran cohort of the Aquitanians), which was initially stationed at the Arnsburg fort, and it is likely it remained in Stockstadt until the fort was abandoned. This is corroborated by several inscriptions from the Dolichenus sanctuary.

=== Exploration ===
The earliest documented archaeological findings in Stockstadt date back to the early 19th century. In 1820, a "considerable Roman bath" was unearthed in the vicinity of the churchyard, "very close to the Main". The construction of the railway (with the Stockstadt railway bridge) in 1858, which crosses the fort area, presented an opportunity for further investigations that was not taken. It was not until 1885 that Wilhelm Conrady conducted excavations on a more extensive scale. The cohort fort was discovered in the spring of the same year. The excavations were conducted over a period of 25 years.

In 1897, it became apparent that a comprehensive investigation was necessary in order to assess the potential impact of a proposed pulp factory to be constructed by the Aschaffenburger Aktien-Gesellschaft für Maschinenpapier-Fabrikation (now Sappi GmbH) on the site. Conrady supervised the archaeological research until shortly before his death, while the factory engineer Carl Wirth, who had a great interest in Roman antiquities, was in charge of the site. A street in Stockstadt, in the vicinity of the fort, is named after him. The majority of the artefacts unearthed during the earlier excavations have been irrecoverably lost. The stone monuments were subsequently donated to the Saalburg Museum, which had provided technical assistance and sent trained workers to the site following Conrady's death. Only a few of the finds were incorporated into the municipal collections of Aschaffenburg or the local history museum. In 1908 and 1909, the Aschaffenburg Historical Society organised a number of re-excavations.

In 1962, during the excavation of a factory building in the northern storage area of the cohort fort, a coin hoard comprising at least six aurei and 1,315 denarii was discovered in a jar. The youngest coin in the hoard had been minted between the years 167 and 168 AD. It is likely that the coin hoard was concealed from the Chatti invaders during the Marcomannic Wars and is now housed in the Aschaffenburg Abbey Museum.

A number of smaller investigations were conducted at the beginning of the 1990s. The investigations yielded new insights into the civilian settlement and the burial grounds. Two further consecration altars were discovered in a filled-in cellar located 50 metres outside the southern corner of the cohort fort. The presence of five horse burials of male animals with bent limbs in the vicinity remains unexplained. The discovery of a pottery and brickworks district comprising over 80 cremation and fire-filled graves provided further insights into the burial grounds.

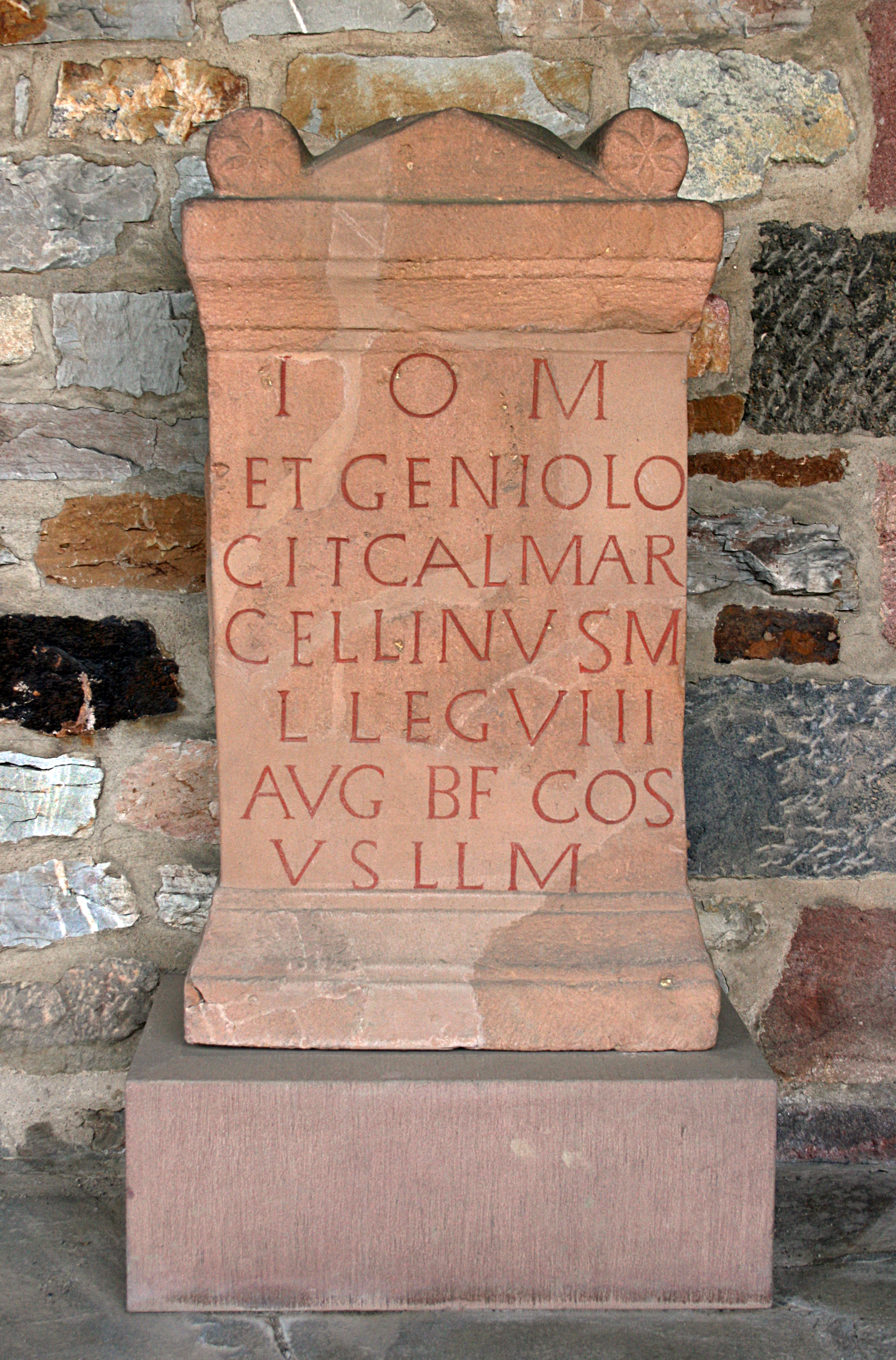
Votive stone of a beneficiarius of Legio VIII Augusta from Stockstadt, today in the principia of the Saalburg fort, Saalburg Museum

=== Stone monuments ===
Finds of stone monuments from the Mithraeum and the Dolichenum in the Roman Limes

The Corpus Signorum Imperii Romani records 146 stone monuments from the fort and vicus of Stockstadt. In addition to the finds from Mithraeum I, the dedication stones of the beneficiarii are of particular interest. Ten of these dedication inscriptions and several fragments are of a higher quality than the other finds, mostly more richly decorated and having a clean, even script. It is possible that this reflects the higher purchasing power of the legionary soldiers who were seconded as beneficiarii.

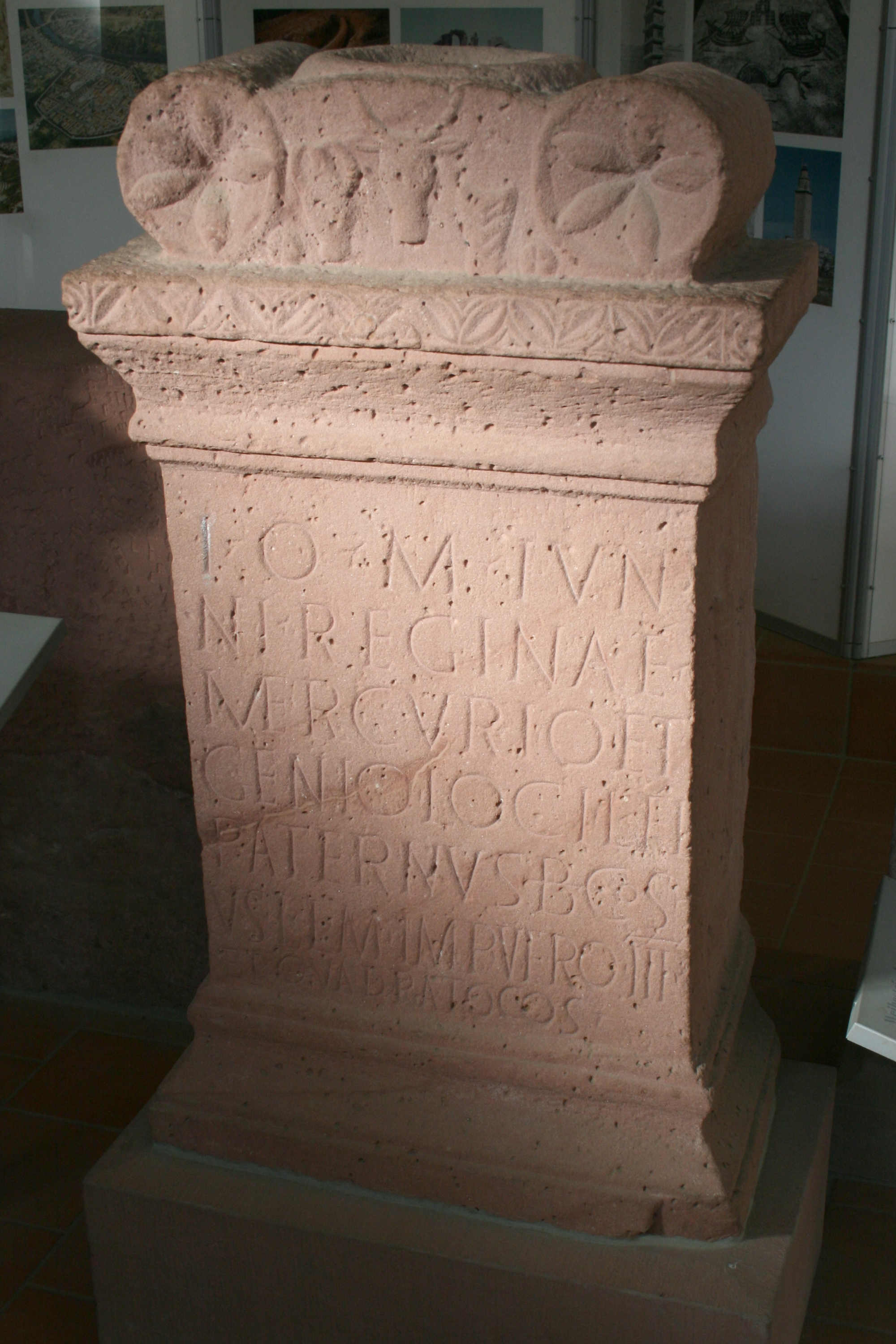
Votive stone of the beneficiarius Lucius Flavius Paternus, exhibited in the Saalburg Museum

A stylistic analysis of the Stockstadt altars reveals that they form a less cohesive group than the numerous finds from the beneficiarius centre nearby Obernburg. In particular, the altar shapes in Stockstadt display a greater degree of variation, with geometric-abstract motifs employed as ornamentation. The consecration altars from Stockstadt exhibit similarities to two consecration stones from the vicinity of Fort Jagsthausen. It is noteworthy that one of the two stones in the vicinity of Fort Jagsthausen, which share stylistic similarities, was consecrated by a soldier who had previously donated a similar stone in Stockstadt. The later stones from Stockstadt are only fragmentary. It seems that production ceased around 210 AD. Some of the altars were reworked and reused in Mithraeum I, with the inscriptions and decorations on the sides of the altars typical of beneficiary dedication stones being preserved.

The fragments of the Mithras cult image indicate that it originates from the same workshop as the fragments discovered in the vicinity of Dieburg. In addition to a strikingly similar division of the pictorial fields, both reliefs depict an identical scene from the Phaethon legend in the medallion field. Furthermore, stylistic similarities can be observed in two reliefs depicting torchbearers (Cautes and Cautopates) and four other sculptures. It is likely that they originated from the same workshop. Although stylistically they can be dated to the last quarter of the 2nd century AD, they were discovered in the later Mithraeum I, which suggests that a significant portion of the inventory was reused in the subsequent construction of the building.

The high number of monuments compared to the hinterland is due to the troops stationed there. While the monuments from civilian settlements, such as the Giant Columns of Jupiter, are in the Gallo-Roman tradition, military personnel from very different regions of the Roman Empire have been found at Stockstadt. There is inscriptional evidence of soldiers from Thracia, Asia Minor, the Near East and North Africa. One of the very rare finds on the Limes is the base of a statue of Genius, with an inscription in very carefully crafted Greek script. The relatively frequent dedications to a genius loci indicate the absence of indigenous pre-Roman cults in the region. One of the regional peculiarities is the window or lintel lunette, which is a common architectural feature on many buildings along the Odenwald Limes.

== Layout ==
A total of three successive fortifications were identified, with a probable rapid structural sequence from the first smaller redoubt to the construction of the cohort fort. The nearby fort sites in Nida-Heddernheim and Altenstadt exhibited a similar development, with the later forts in Altenstadt covering the earlier ones. The Salisberg Fort, which is also located nearby, has a similar initial date to Stockstadt. It is probable that the Kesselstadt fort was a predecessor to the later Limes line forts of Rückingen and Großkrotzenburg. It is possible that the Seligenstadt fort south of the Main and the earlier Hainstadt fort correspond to this pattern. Due to later overbuilding, there are even fewer reliably stratified finds from most of these forts than from Stockstadt. The chronological sequence of the Stockstadt forts therefore has a significant influence on the dating of other Limes forts on the Main Limes and on the eastern Wetterau stretch.

=== Redoubt or small wooden fort ===
The so-called earth redoubt, more properly known as a small wooden fort, was situated to the north of the railway line. The only surviving feature was the ditch, while the rampart, which was probably constructed from earth and reinforced with wood, had been completely demolished. The internal area of the early fort, as measured from the top of the ditch, was 66 metres by 57 metres, or 0.38 hectares.

It is not possible to provide reliable information regarding the interior structure. One reason for this is that, due to the excavation methods employed by the RLK, no features of wooden buildings from the military or civilian area were identified in the entirety of Stockstadt. Conversely, the inner area was covered by buildings of the fort vicus following the abandonment of the redoubt and the early wood-earth fort. It was not possible to distinguish these civilian features, which can be dated to a later period, from the early fort complexes with any degree of reliability. Furthermore, the precise location of artefacts found in the fort ditch could not be documented. It is therefore also possible that the finds were deposited in the open trenches at a much later date, following the abandonment of the fortification.

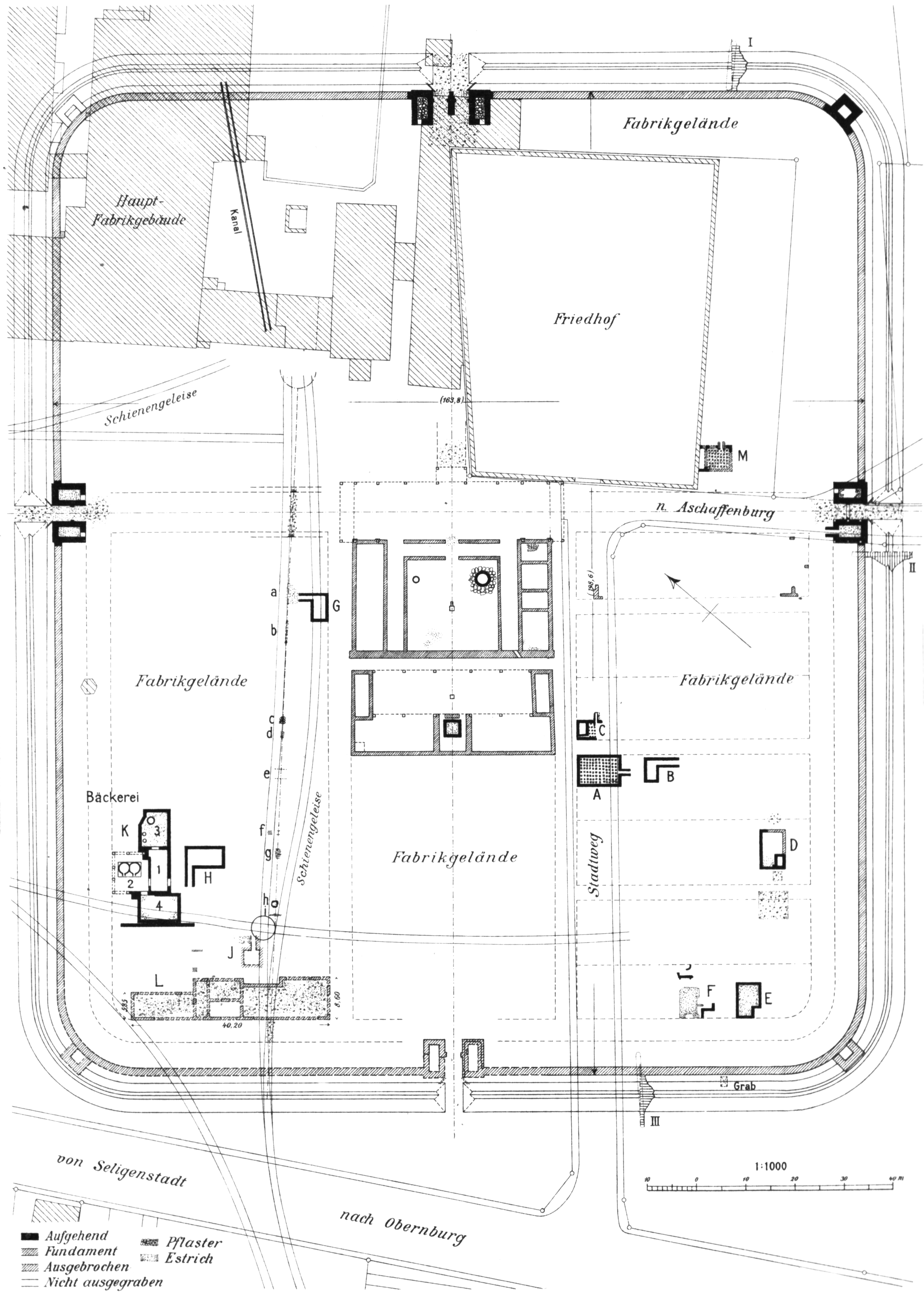
Floor plan of the cohort fort in the Limeswerk.

=== Wood and Earth Fort ===
The existence of the wood and earth fort is corroborated by the discovery of a ditch that ran parallel to the southeastern ditch of the previous redoubt. The ditch was identified over a length of approximately 50 metres. As the ditch then bent to the southeast, it can be concluded that there was another intermediate enclosure between the small wooden fort and the later large cohort fort. It is probable that the south-western continuation of the ditch ran beneath the later town road. It is not possible to make any statements regarding the size of the camp. Similarly, the dating of the site remains uncertain. It is beyond doubt that it existed before the cohort fort, and it is probable that it was a successor to the small wooden fort. Another possibility is that it was occupied for a brief period as a construction camp for the cohort fort.

=== Cohort fort ===
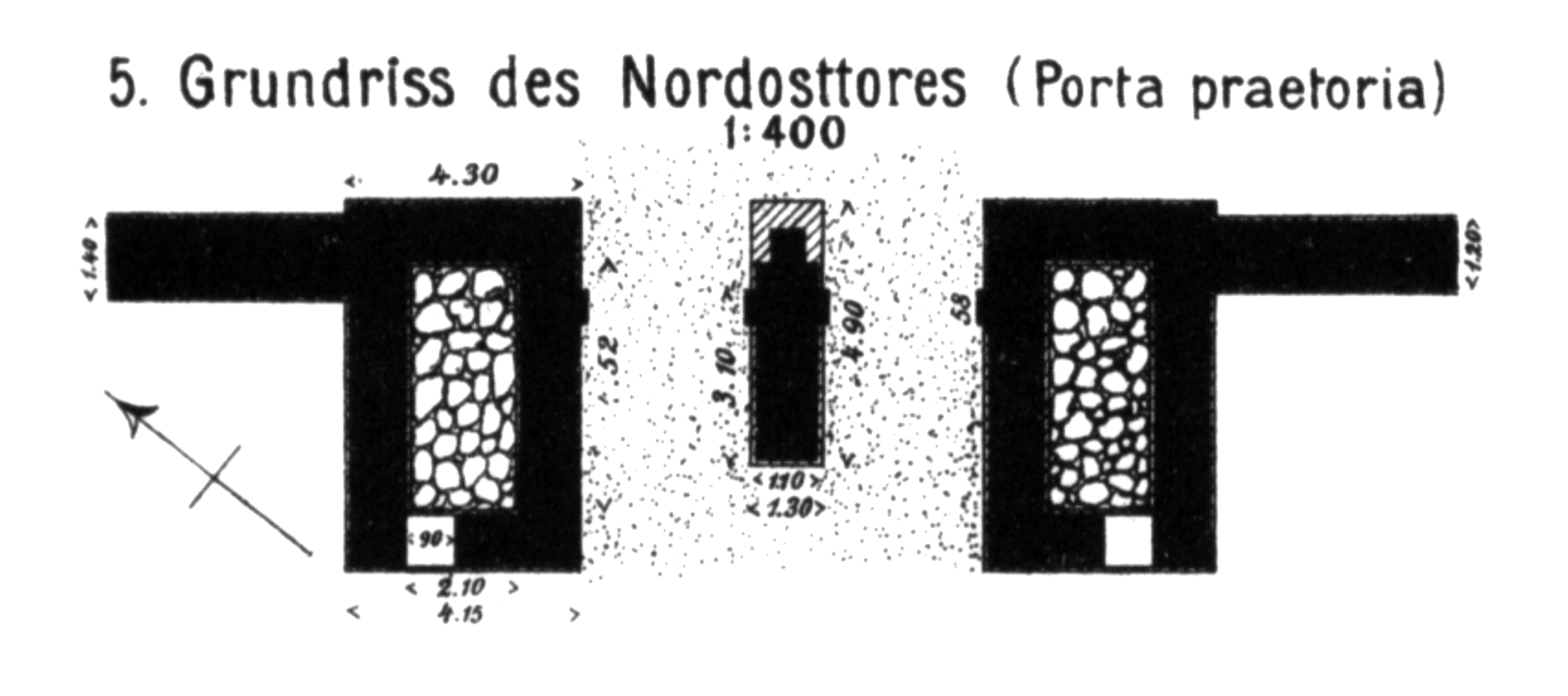
The porta praetoria facing the Main, the narrow and deep gate towers are striking.

The cohort fort, situated to the south of the two previous fortifications, was orientated to the north-east, towards the River Main. Due to the excavation methods employed at the time, only stone buildings were documented. The existence of a timber-earth construction or timber-framed building within the fort is evidenced by the discovery of an older wooden structure beneath the principia (staff building) and a wooden predecessor of the north-eastern gate tower, the porta principalis sinistra (left camp gate). The fort covers an area of 198.6 × 163.8 metres, equivalent to 3.25 hectares. Its architectural style is comparable to those of the forts at Saalburg, Marköbel, Langenhain and Butzbach, which were probably constructed at the same time and, as far as is known, were designed for a part-mounted cohort (cohors equitata).

The excavation pits of the foundation walls were almost exclusively the only remaining evidence of the stone fortifications. They were clearly visible in the surrounding gravel soil. The foundation masonry comprised local gneiss, also known as Ballenberger stone. The use of red Main sandstone for the rising masonry was favoured due to its weather resistance. A notable number of twelve tin capstones were discovered, in addition to five angled pieces (potentially originating from the unroofed corner towers). The length of the straight pieces ranged from 1.07 to 1.34 metres. All of the capstones were discovered within the backfill of the trench. It is possible that the unwieldy stones, which were difficult to reuse, were discarded in the still open fort ditch before the fort wall was removed down to the foundations to utilise the stones.

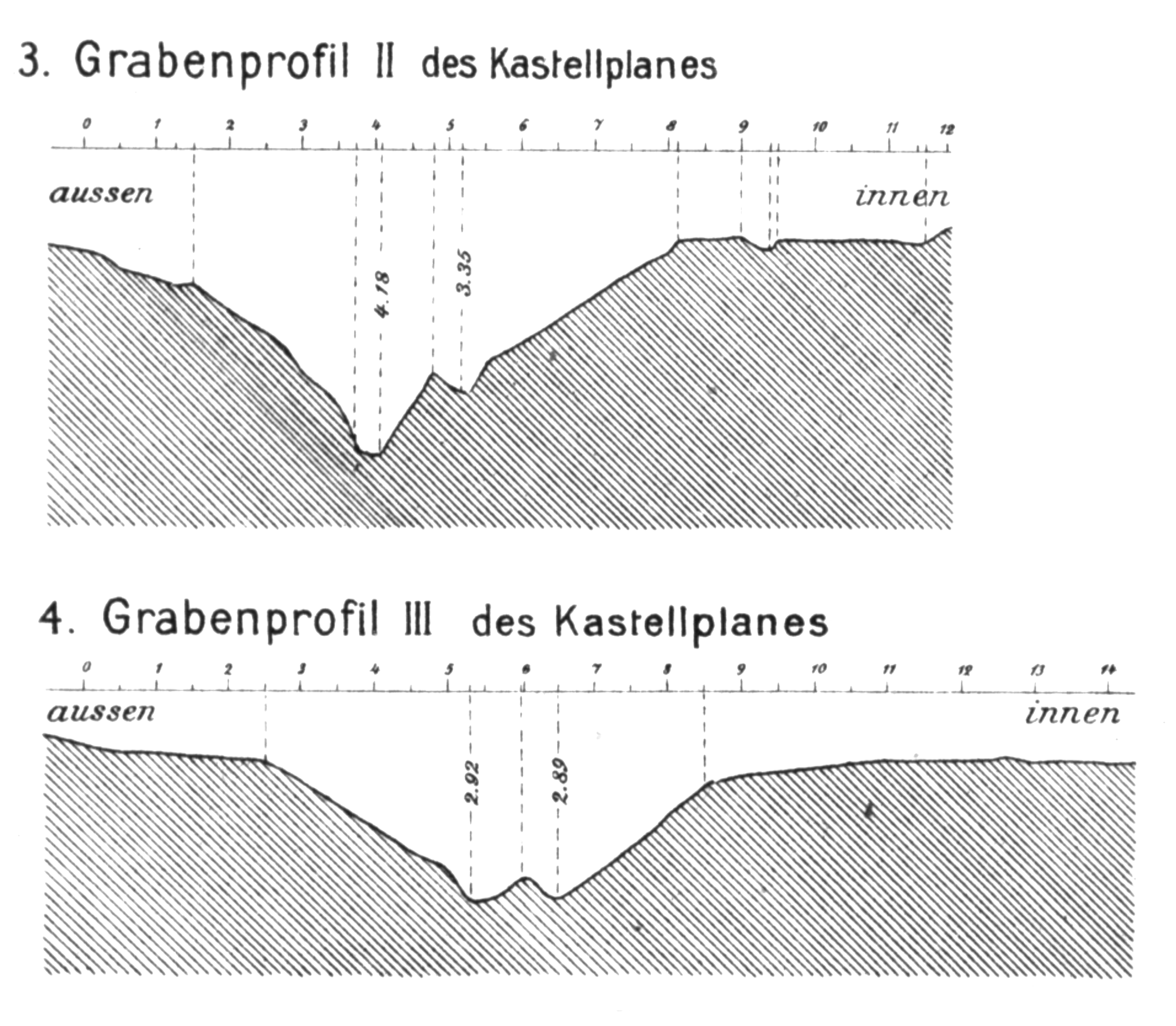
Various trench profiles with double point.

The width of the fort wall was between 1.20 and 1.40 metres, while the foundations measured 1.80 metres. At the corners, the fort was rounded with an inner radius of 15 metres. The corner towers, which project outward at a width of 5.30 metres and a height of 3.80 metres, are particularly striking on the ground plan. It is likely that these towers were added in a later construction phase. No intermediate towers were discovered. The gate towers were also remarkably narrow and deep (6.90 × 4.20 m), with the exception of the porta praetoria (front camp gate), the remaining three gates were only equipped with a single passageway. The wall was accompanied by an embankment on the interior, with a width estimated to be between 4.60 and 5.10 metres, based on the evidence of the via sagularis (rampart road).

A simple, pointed trench with a width of approximately 7 metres encircled the fort. The ditch was separated from the wall by a berm measuring between 1.20 and 1.40 metres in width. The renewal of the ditch is evidenced by the presence of a double point in the profile (trench section) with a distance of approximately 80 centimetres between them.

With the exception of the stone principia (staff building), only partial floor plans of the interior buildings are known. The majority of these structures are those with deeper foundations, of which the timber-framed extensions were not identified. In the northwest corner, a larger building complex with several ovens was identified, which is referred to as a bakery.

Floor plan of the bath building (left), on the right buildings from the vicus, mostly cellars

=== Fort baths ===
The bath building was situated approximately 50 metres in front of the southern part of the praetorial front, the side of the camp facing the enemy, in the immediate vicinity of the River Main. Following its initial discovery and conservation in 1820, subsequent investigations could only be carried out during the subsequent large-scale excavations. The length of the structure is 44.50 metres, with a maximum width of 19.45 metres. It is of the so-called row type, in which the three most important bath tracts are arranged one behind the other on one axis. Given the absence of evidence for an apodyterium (undressing room), it is likely that the structure consisted of an extension constructed of wood or framework. Similar findings have been documented at the fort baths in Würzberg and Walldürn.

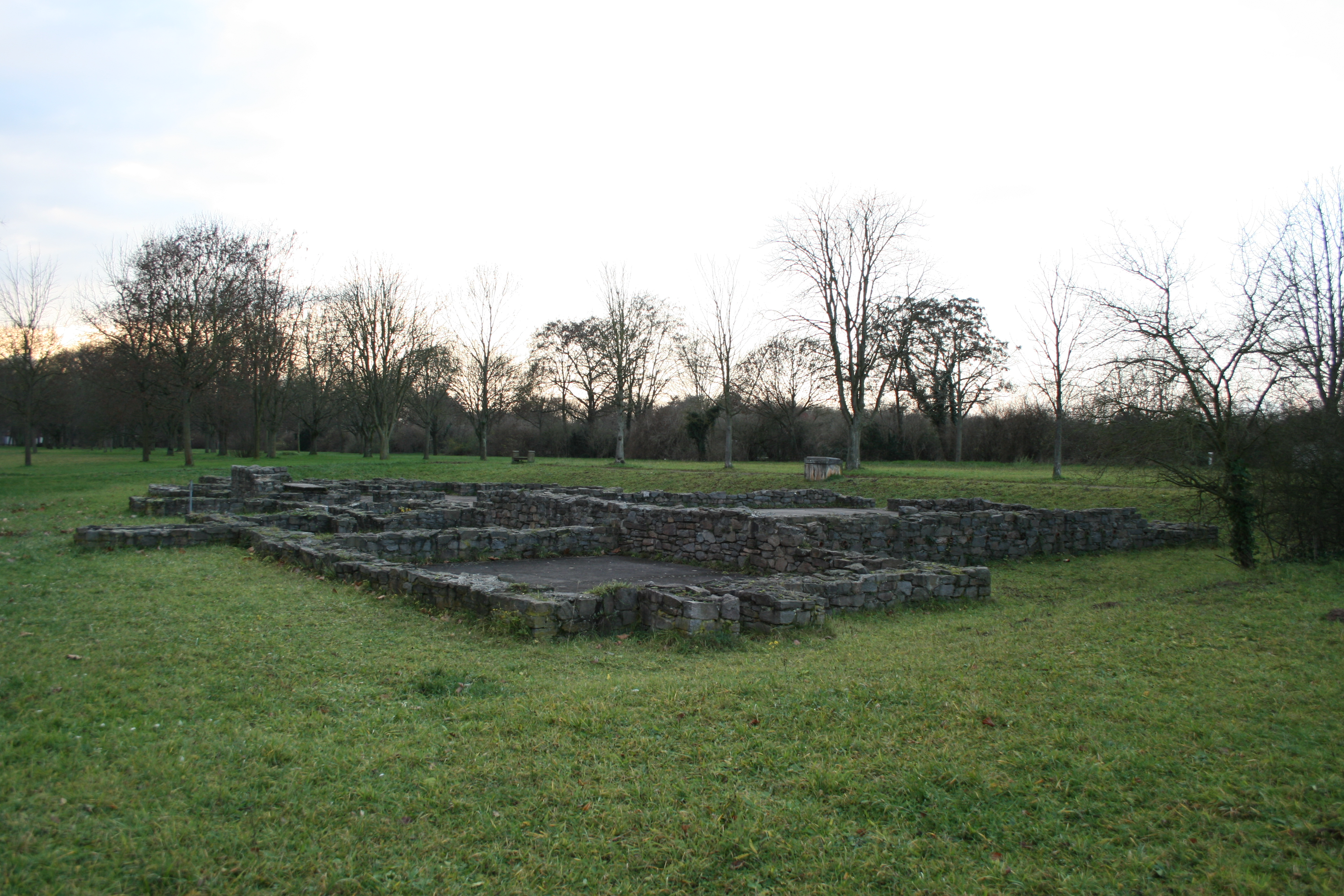
The restored fort baths, today in Nilkheim Park.

The apses of the hot baths, which are particularly common in buildings from the Hadrianic period onwards, initially led to the conclusion that the building in question was constructed during this period. However, similar types of fort baths are already known from the Upper Germanic Limes from the Flavian period, including the baths at Fort Echzell, Fort Bendorf, and Fort Salisberg.

Following the archaeological excavations conducted at the turn of the 19th and 20th centuries, the baths were subsequently restored. Seventy years later, the site was redeveloped for industrial purposes, with the construction of a factory building in 1968. The structure was transferred to a location in Nilkheimer Park, where it remains to this day.

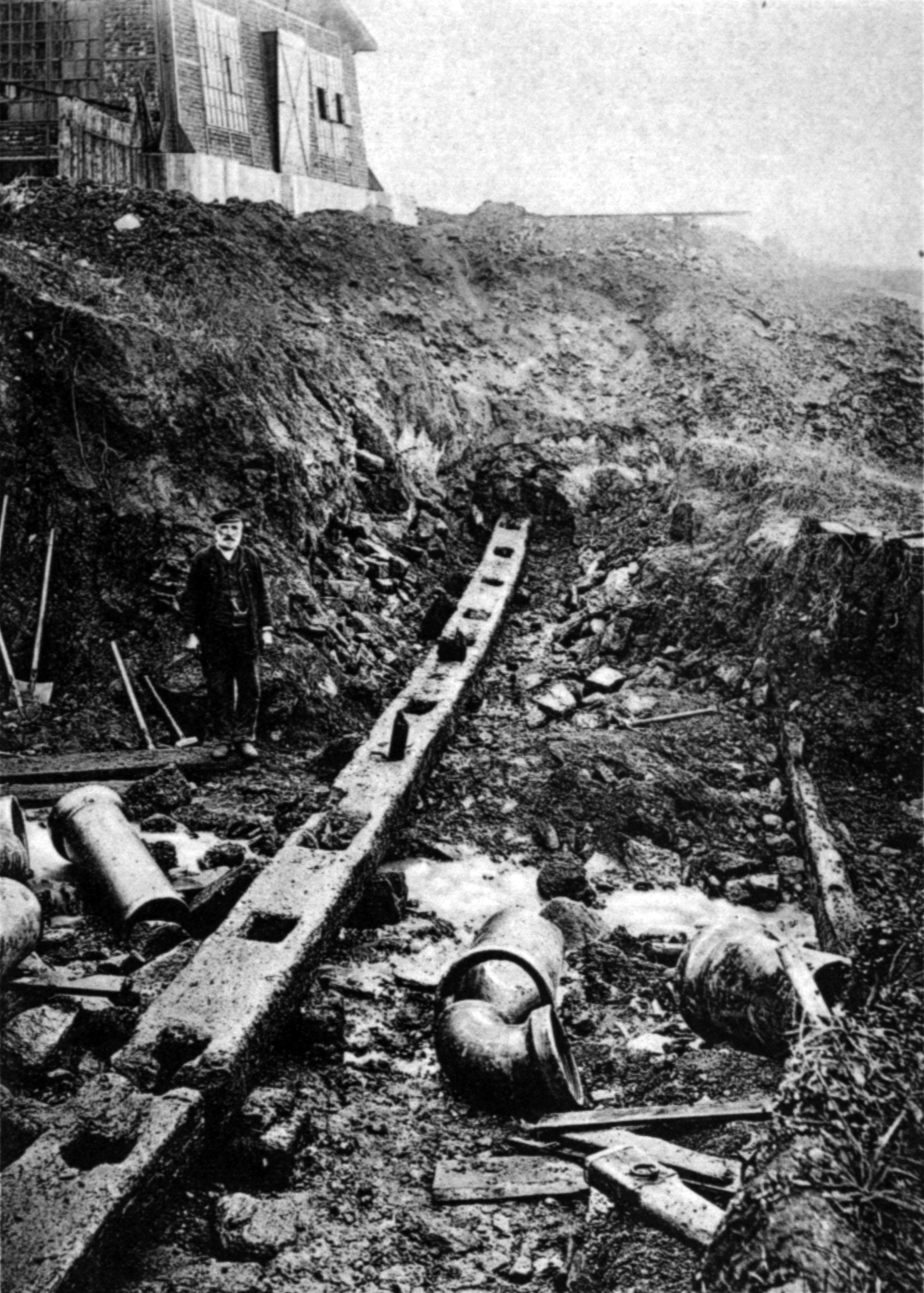
The wooden components of the landing stage during uncovering, around 1900

=== Vicus and burial grounds ===
The fort village (vicus) extended along the River Main to the north and south of the fort. As with the fort's interior development, only lower-lying features such as cellars and hypocausts have been documented. Consequently, it is not possible to gain a coherent picture of the residential development. Nevertheless, over 50 cellars or stone buildings were excavated by Wirth. The extension of the via principalis to the north and south constituted the principal axis of the camp village. In certain instances, the road was identified and found to be nine metres in width. To the south of the fort, the settlement appears to have been more densely populated, to the extent that the road was no longer sufficient for access. A second road ran in a parallel direction approximately 100 metres to the west, which presumably reached the rear fort gate (porta decumana).

Many of the cemeteries have been excavated, especially to the north of the railway line and the redoubt. Several individual finds in the vicus have been included in the archaeological research.

About 100 metres north of the cohort fort, near the banks of the Main, a brick kiln dating from 95 to 125 CE was discovered, which, according to the stamps, was operated by the Cohors III Aquitanorum (3rd cohort of the Aquitani). Another kiln belonging to the same unit was discovered 75 metres from the southern corner of the fort. The bricks were mainly used for buildings inside the stone fort.

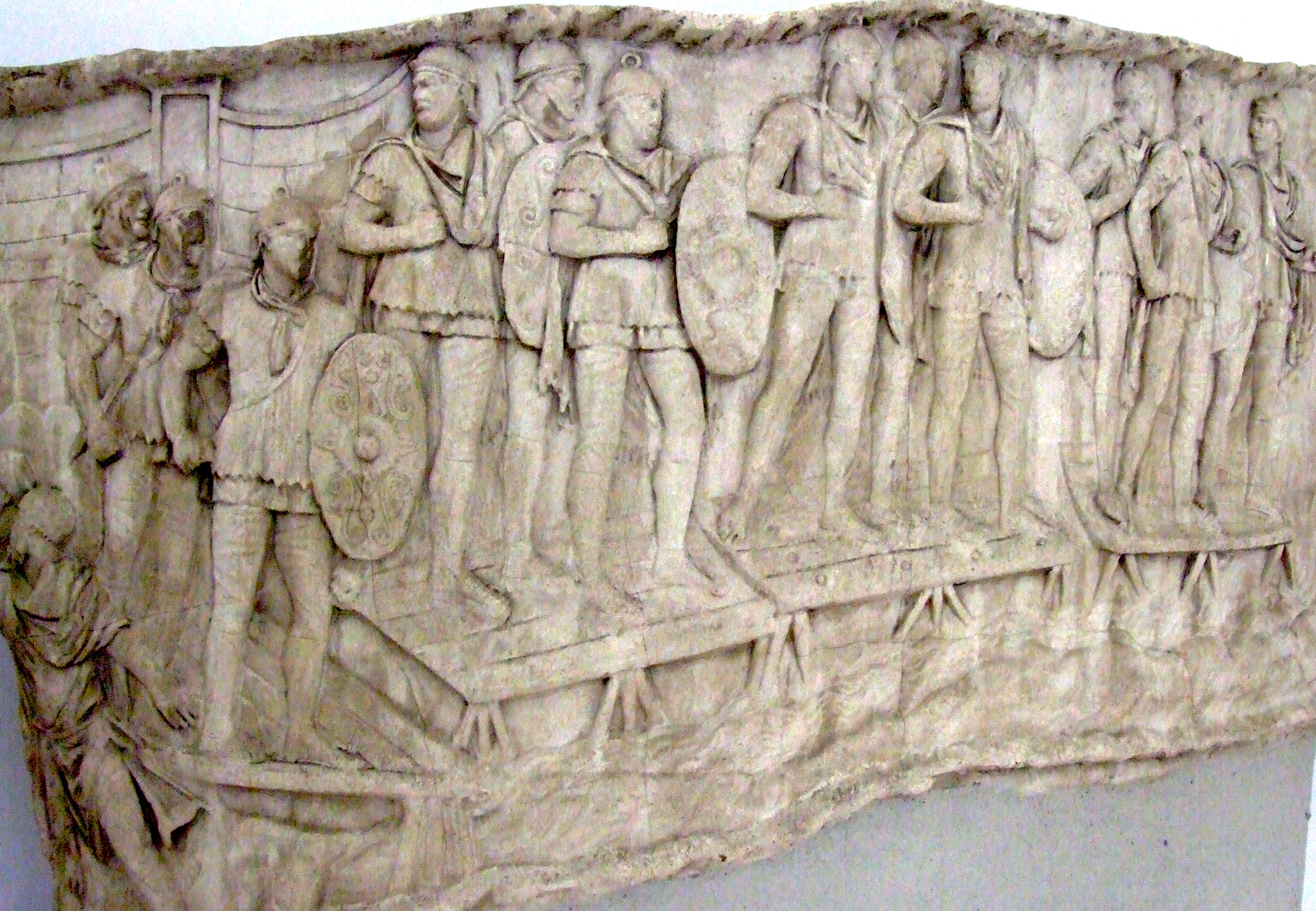
Depiction of a bridge on Trajan's Column, which is very similar to the wooden structure of the Stockstadt landing stage.

==== Ship landing stage ====
In front of the northeastern corner of the camp was a landing stage for ships. A badly damaged quay wall was found, 2.70 metres wide and up to 2.40 metres high. It rested on a grid of oak poles. In front of it, there was a wooden structure with several beams mortised together. Its purpose was probably to allow ships with a larger draught to dock. A representation on Trajan's Column in Rome is very similar to the dock in Stockstadt.

==== Beneficiarius station ====
In the vicinity of the landing stage, numerous consecration altars of beneficiarii consulares have been unearthed from the largely boggy ground since 1886. The quantity of stone inscriptions indicates that the structure was a monitoring station for trade, particularly maritime trade. The inscriptions date from 166 to 208 Ce. It is possible that the station was then abandoned. Some of the older dedication altars of the beneficiarii were found reused in Mithraeum I. Despite an intensive search, Conrady was only able to discover cultural layers and building rubble from the associated building.

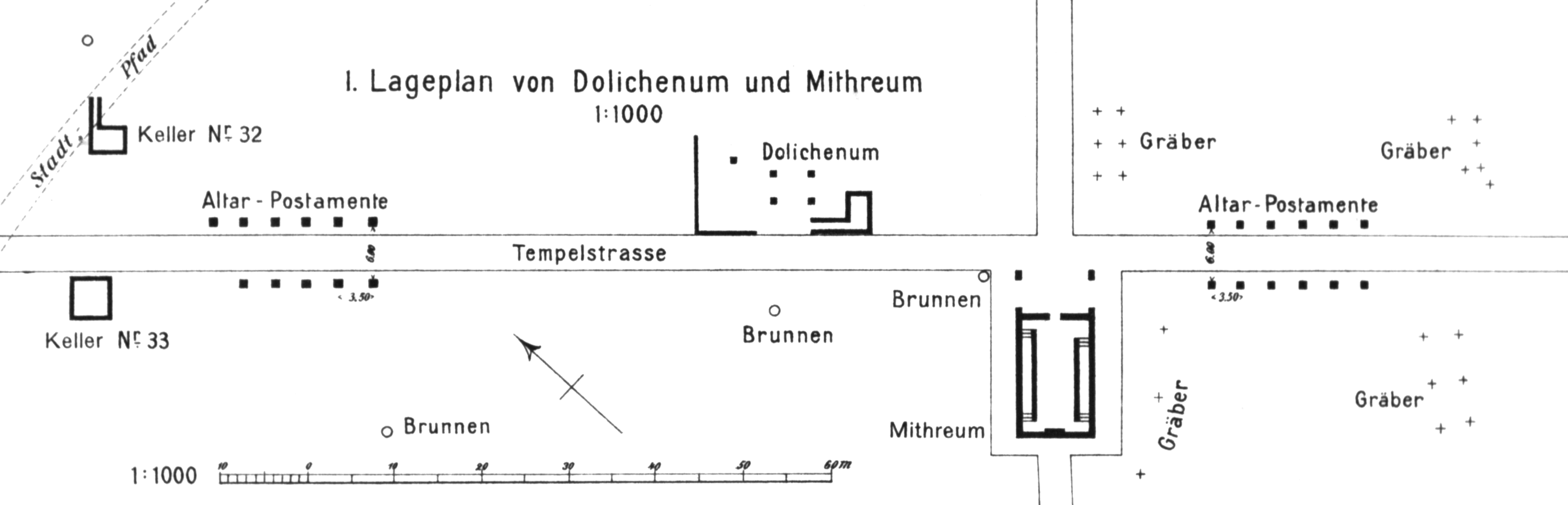
Site plan of Mithraeum I and the Dolichenus sanctuary after the RLK excavations.

==== Mithraeum I and II ====
Mithraeum I (13.00 × 7.80 m) was discovered southeast of the fort in 1902. According to the finds, it is the younger of the two sanctuaries, built around 210 CE. A fire destroyed the building, but its extraordinarily rich inventory was preserved in the ground. These included a silver votive plate, fragments of a revolving cult image of Mithras and 66 other stone monuments. Smaller finds such as coins are under-represented. The discovery of three different statues of Mercury suggests that the worship of this god was of particular importance. Each of the two mithraeums contained a statue of Mercury with a child in his arms. The dedication of a large number of gods in the sanctuaries shows that religious beliefs gradually became mixed.

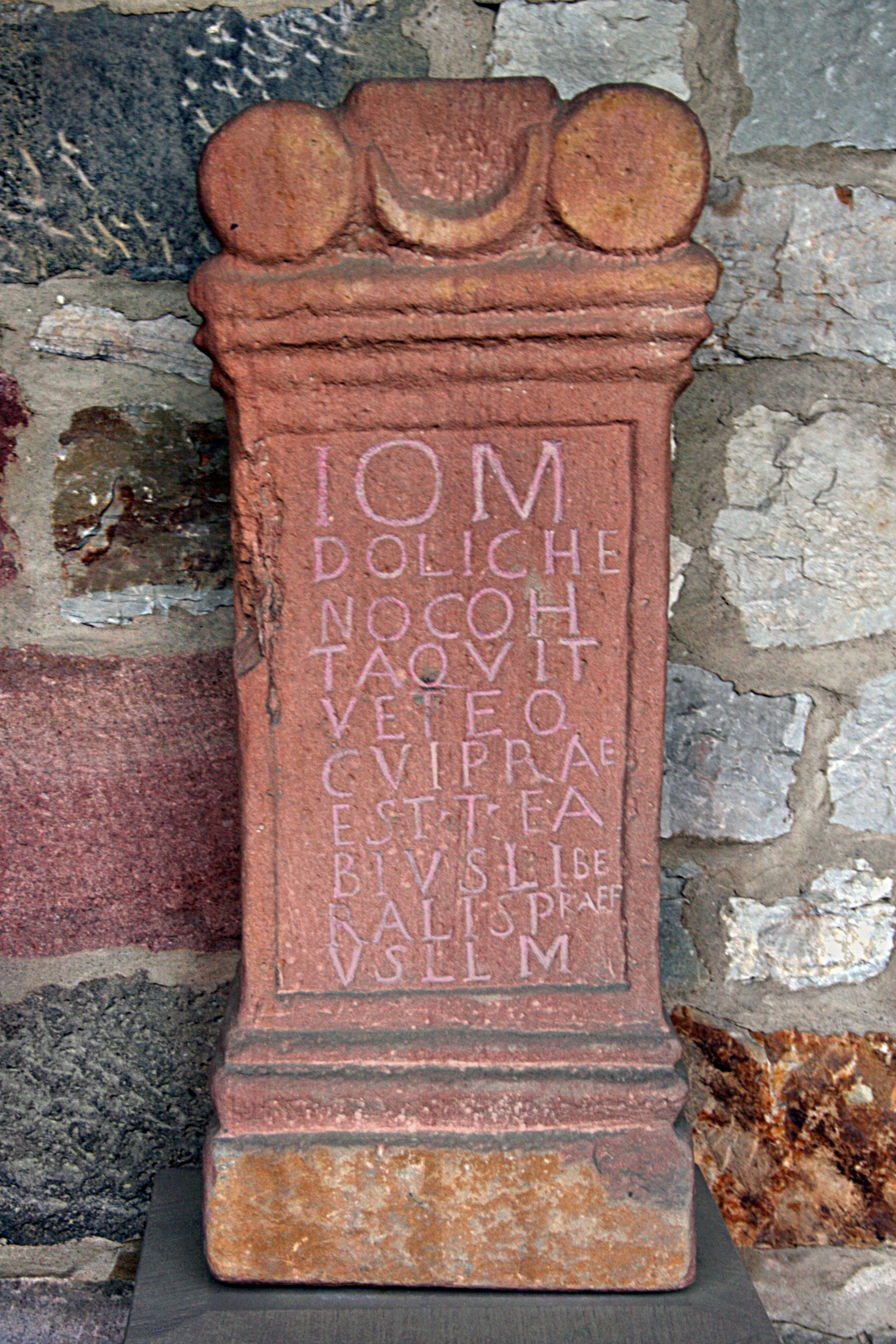
Altar to Iupiter Dolichenus from the sanctuary, consecrated by the Coh. I Aquitanorum vet. eq., exhibited in the Saalburg Museum.

In 1909/10, another sanctuary was uncovered on the southeast side of the small wooden fort near the River Main. This was designated Mithraeum II (11.50 × 6.50 m). The discovery of coin finds, which are to be regarded as building offerings, provides a terminus post quem for the construction of Mithraeum II after 157 A.D. The finds, which comprise five altars and a statue of Mercury, are considerably fewer in number than those discovered in Mithraeum I. In particular, a cult image is missing. The deposition of settlement waste within the building, which was subsequently destroyed by fire in the 3rd century, provides corroboration for the chronological sequence of the two mithraeums. It is possible that the cult image from Mithraeum II was reused in the later building.

==== Dolichenus Sanctuary ====
A sanctuary for Jupiter Dolichenus (also known as Dolichenum) was discovered to the southeast of the fort, situated in close proximity to Mithraeum I. Due to the extensive damage to the building, it is not possible to provide a precise illustration of the floor plan. However, inscriptions indicate that it was in use during the Severan period. The cult, which was particularly popular with soldiers, could have been established mainly by the Cohors I Aquitanorum, which has been documented in Stockstadt since the middle of the 2nd century. In addition to the communal dedication inscription of the troop, which refers to a vow that was honoured, another inscription names one of its prefects. A special feature of the finds are numerous bull horns and skulls, probably the remains of sacrificial animals.

== Heritage protection and whereabouts of finds ==
The extensive destruction of the fort area through overbuilding has resulted in Stockstadt Fort being excluded from the UNESCO World Heritage Site Frontiers of the Roman Empire. Nevertheless, the fort and the aforementioned facilities are safeguarded as registered archaeological monuments in accordance with the provisions of the Bavarian Monument Protection Act (BayDSchG). Investigations and the targeted collection of finds are subject to authorisation. In the event of an accidental find, it is the responsibility of the finder to report this to the relevant monument authorities.

Roman finds from Stockstadt are exhibited in the Saalburg Museum, the Aschaffenburg Abbey Museum and the Stockstadt Local History Museum.

== Literature ==
- Baatz, Dietwulf (2002). "Stockstadt am Main AB. Kohortenkastell". In Baatz, Dietwulf; Beckmann, Bernhard; Herrmann, Fritz-Rudolf (eds.). Die Römer in Hessen (in German) (2 expanded ed.). Hamburg: Nikol. pp. 479–481. ISBN 978-3-933203-58-8
- Baatz, Dietwulf (2000). Der Römische Limes: archäologische Ausflüge zwischen Rhein und Donau (in German) (4 expanded ed.). Berlin: Gebr. Mann. pp. 176f, 231, 233f. ISBN 978-3-7861-2347-7
- Baatz, Dietwulf (1969). "Zur Datierung des Bades am Limeskastell Stockstadt". Bayerische Vorgeschichtsblätter (in German). 34: 63–75.
- Dietz, Karlheinz. "Zwei Jupiterweihungen aus Stockstadt a. Main. Landkreis Aschaffenburg, Unterfranken". Das archäologische Jahr in Bayern 1990 (in German). Stuttgart: Konrad Theiss. pp. 104–107.
- Drexel, Friedrich (1914). Das Kastell Stockstadt. ORL B (in German). Vol. 3. Heidelberg/Berlin/Leipzig: Otto Petters.
- Hensen, Andreas (2011). "Die Tempel des Mithras beim Kastell von Stockstadt am Main". Der Limes: Nachrichtenblatt der Deutschen Limeskommission (in German). 5 (2): 10–13.
- Kellner, Hans-Jörg (1963). "Ein Schatzfund aus dem Kastell Stockstadt, Lkr. Aschaffenburg". Germania (in German). 41: 119–122.
- Mattern, Marion (2005). Römische Steindenkmäler aus Hessen südlich des Mains sowie vom bayerischen Teil des Mainlimes. Corpus Signorum Imperii Romani (in German). Vol. 2, 13. Mainz: Verlag des Römisch-Germanischen Zentralmuseums. ISBN 978-3-88467-091-0
- Schleiermacher, L. (1928). "Das zweite Mithräum in Stockstadt a.M.". Germania (in German). 12: 46–56.
- Schönberger, Hans (1954). "Die Körpergräber des vierten Jahrhunderts aus Stockstadt a. Main". Bayerische Vorgeschichtsblätter (in German). 20: 128–134.
- Stade, Kurt (1933). Strecke 6. ORL (in German). Vol. A3. Heidelberg/Berlin/Leipzig: Otto Petters. pp. 29–70.
- Steidl, Bernd (2008). Welterbe Limes: Roms Grenze am Main (in German). Obernburg am Main: Logo. p. 157. ISBN 978-3-939462-06-4
- Wamser, Ludwig. "Ausgrabungen im Vicus des Römerkastells Stockstadt a. Main. Landkreis Aschaffenburg, Unterfranken". Das archäologische Jahr in Bayern 1990 (in German). Stuttgart: Konrad Theiss. pp. 98–104.
