= Ermelo, Netherlands =

Ermelo
- Municipality
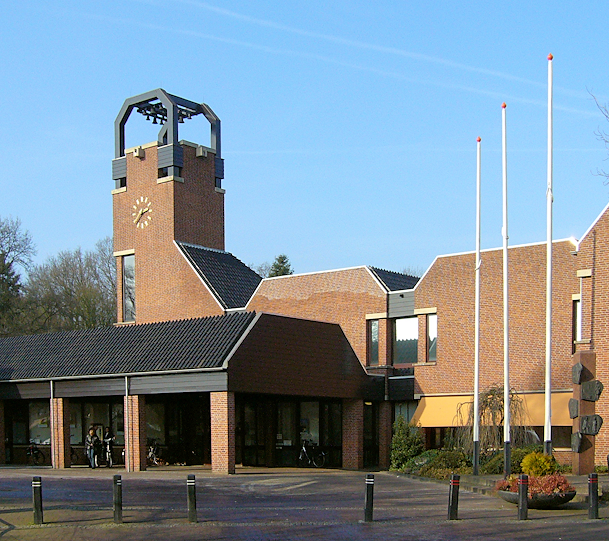
- Ermelo town hall

- Flag Coat of arms

- Location in Gelderland
- Coordinates: 52°18′N 5°37′E
- Country: Netherlands
- Province: Gelderland

Government
  - Body: Municipal council
  - Mayor: Hans van Daalen

Area
  - Total: 87.33 km^{2} (33.72 sq mi)
  - Land: 85.63 km^{2} (33.06 sq mi)
  - Water: 1.70 km^{2} (0.66 sq mi)
- Elevation: 13 m (43 ft)

Population (January 2021)
  - Total: 27,016
  - Density: 315/km^{2} (820/sq mi)
- Demonym: Ermeloër
- Time zone: UTC+1 (CET)
  - Summer (DST): UTC+2 (CEST)
- Postcode: 3850–3853
- Area code: 0341
- Website: www.ermelo.nl

Ermelo (Dutch pronunciation: [ˈɛrməloː], Dutch Low Saxon: Armelo or Armel) is a municipality and town in the Netherlands; found within Gelderland province and the forest-rich Veluwe area. The 2021 population was 27,016.

== Etymology ==
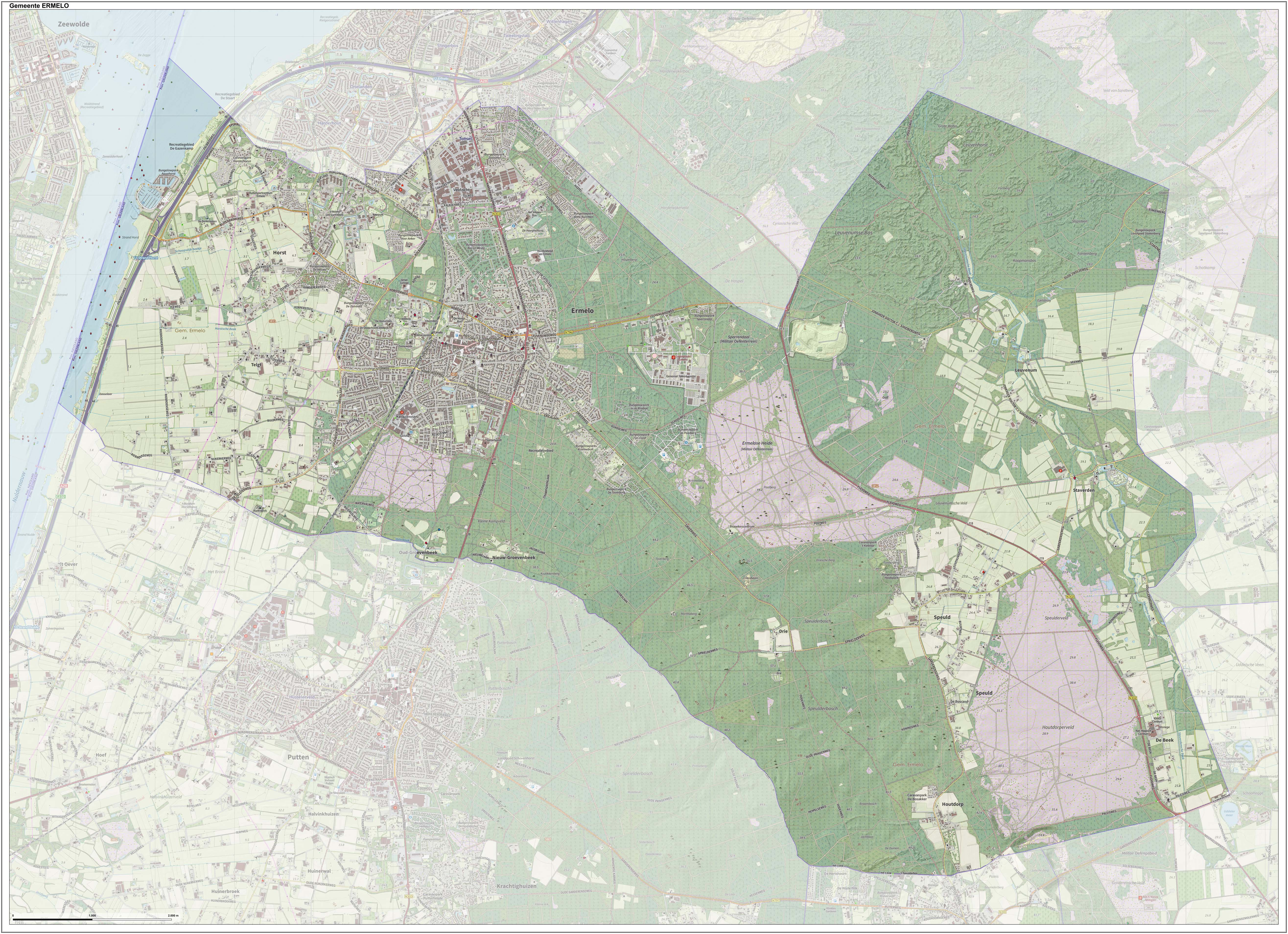
Ermelo comes from lo, meaning "woods" and irmin for which several explanations are given. Some of those are "great", "divine" or it refers to an old Germanic god called Irmin.

== Population centres ==
- De Beek
- Drie
- Ermelo
- Horst
- Houtdorp
- Leuvenum
- Speuld
- Staverden
- Telgt
- Tonsel

== History ==
The town has been known to exist since at least 855, when the name Irminlo first appeared in a legal document. Human presence in the area goes back further however, with many archaeological finds of the Bell-Beaker culture having been made in the area.

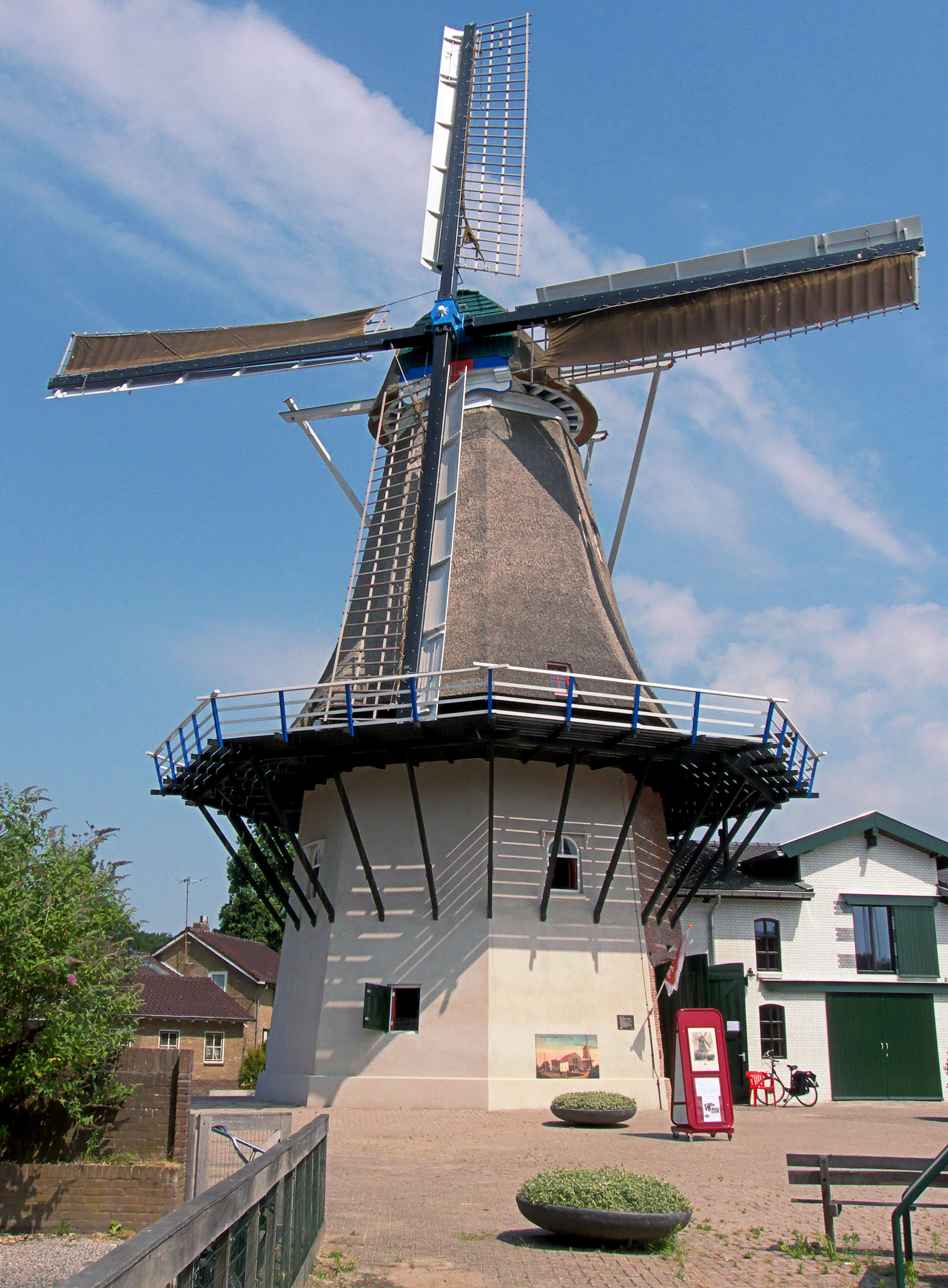
Windmill De Koe

Two Roman marching camps have been found on the push moraine east of Ermelo. They were far in hostile territory, on the route between the Limes and the ancient Lake Flevo. The largest camp of 6 hectares offered space for 4000-6000 legionaries: Roman Ermelo. The diamond-shaped earthen defensive walls of this huge marching camp can still be partly seen in the landscape and were partly restored in 2006. A second smaller camp was not found until 2017. In 2020, excavations confirmed that it was of Roman origin.

For a long time, the town most likely consisted of little more than a few farms and some other buildings, such as a windmill and a church and it didn't grow very much until the 19th century. In the year 1830, a road was constructed to make this part of the Veluwe more accessible, and at the end of the 19th century, a railway station was built in the town. Because the railway station was some distance away from what was then the town centre, a road was constructed, the Stationsstraat, which is now considered to be the centre of the town.

After the second world war, a shortage of houses resulted in a rapid growth of Ermelo. In 1973, Nunspeet became its own separate municipality after having been part of Ermelo before. In 2005, Ermelo celebrated its 1150-year-long existence. Various artists from across the country performed during the festivities. A classic windmill dating from 1863 located in the town centre, named De Koe (The Cow), partially burned down in 1990 after having been hit by lightning, but was restored to working order in late 2008. A nightclub moved out due to the complete renovation.

== Recreation ==
There are many campsites in the forests surrounding Ermelo which are popular place to stay for mainly Dutch and German tourists. Cycling through the forests and heaths is a popular activity, especially during the summer. The nearby Veluwemeer allows for recreation on the water or beach. The town centre is home to various bars and restaurants and a tourist information centre.

Ermelo hosts various music festivals, such as the Fête de la Musique, Multipop and the International Boogie Woogie Festival. In 2010 the latter featured amongst others pianist Little Willie Littlefield and saxophonist Big Jay McNeely.

== Transport ==
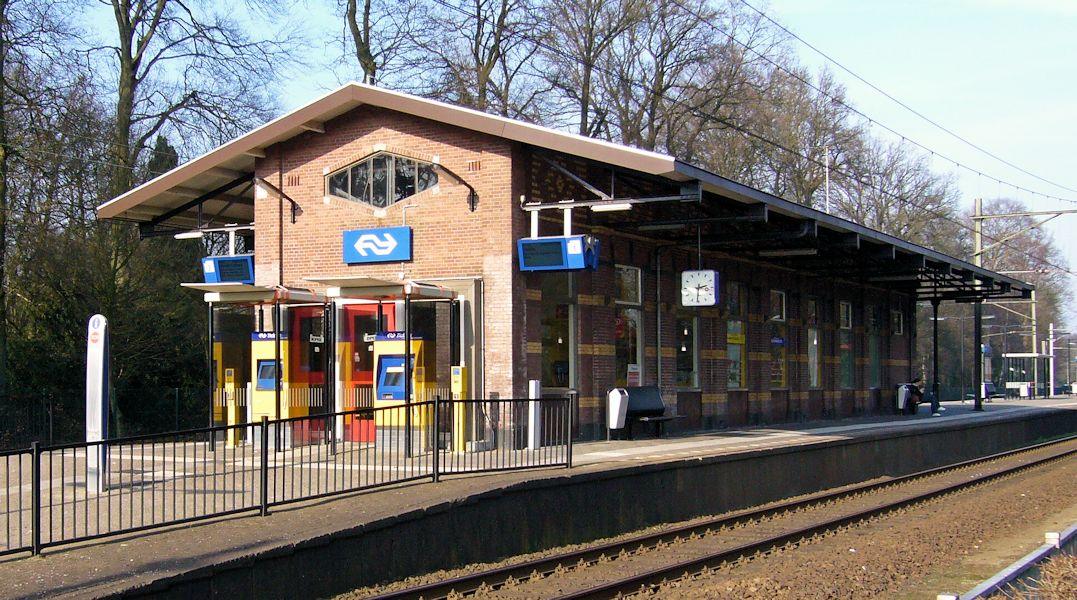
Ermelo station

The town's railway station is located near the town centre, with a train normally leaving every 30 minutes during the day both north towards Zwolle and south towards Amersfoort and Utrecht. By car, it can be easily reached from highway A28 which passes west of the town and provincial road N303 which passes through the town. There are also various bus routes passing through the town. Horst, Gelderland is easily accessible from the A28. A pedestrian and cyclist only ferry operates between Horst beach and Zeewolde, crossing the Veluwemeer.

== Sports ==
Ermelo is home to various sports clubs. At the time of UEFA Euro 2000, the Portugal national football team stayed in Ermelo and played against one of the local clubs, DVS '33. This club organizes an annual international tournament for young players. Spanish La Liga football team Valencia CF has regularly used Ermelo as a base for their preseason training, and have played a number of matches at the local ground against other visiting clubs from Europe, such as Lokomotiv Sofia in 2007 and Fenerbahçe in 2006. In May 2009 it became clear that plans for a merge of DVS'33, EFC '58 and KC Ermelo were cancelled. The National Equestrian Center of the Dutch National Equestrian Federation (KNHS) is also located in Ermelo. They hosted the 2009 European Championships for Juniors and Young Riders in dressage, the World Championships for Young Dressage Horses, the Dutch Dressage Championships and various international equestrian championships.

== Notable people ==
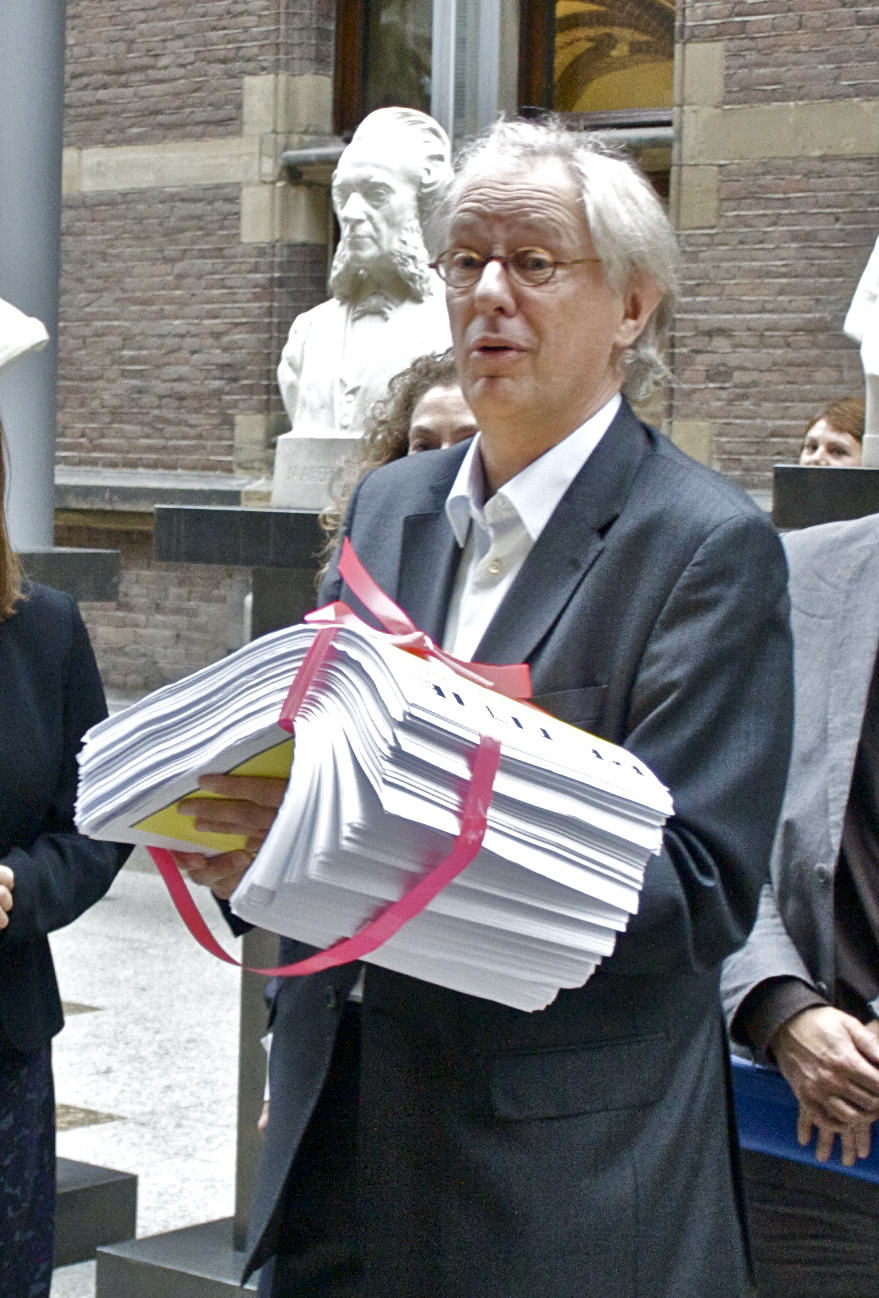
Bas Jan van Bochove, 2009

- Eva and Abraham Beem (1932 & 1934 - 1944) Dutch Jewish siblings, lived in Ermello; gassed to death in Auschwitz concentration camp
- Bernard Willem Holtrop (born 1941 in Ermelo) a Dutch cartoonist living in France
- Bas Jan van Bochove (born 1950 in Ermelo) a former Dutch politician and educator
- Werner Vogels (born 1958 in Ermelo) is the chief technology officer and vice president of Amazon
- Reinette Klever (born 1967) a Dutch politician and former asset manager; lives in Ermelo
- Olger van Dijk (born 1979), Dutch politician

=== Sport ===
- Hendrika Timmer (1926–1994) a Dutch chess player, grew up in Ermelo
- Peter Boeve (born 1957 in Staverden) a Dutch retired footballer with 276 club caps
- Aart Vierhouten (born 1970 in Ermelo) a Dutch former professional racing cyclist
- Martin van der Spoel (born 1971 in Ermelo) a former swimmer, competed at the 1996 Summer Olympics

== Gallery ==
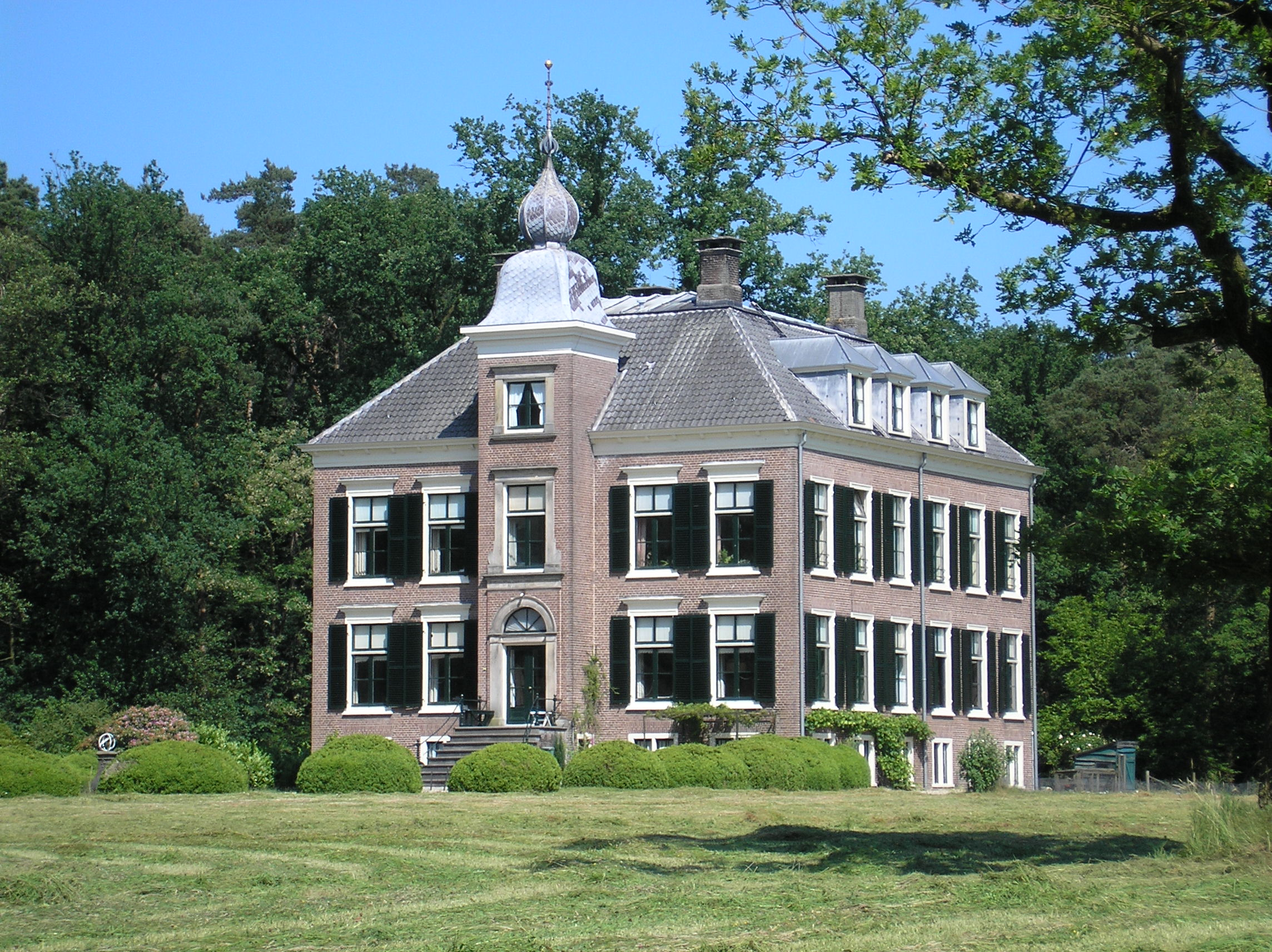
Manor house Huis te Leuvenum in Leuvenum

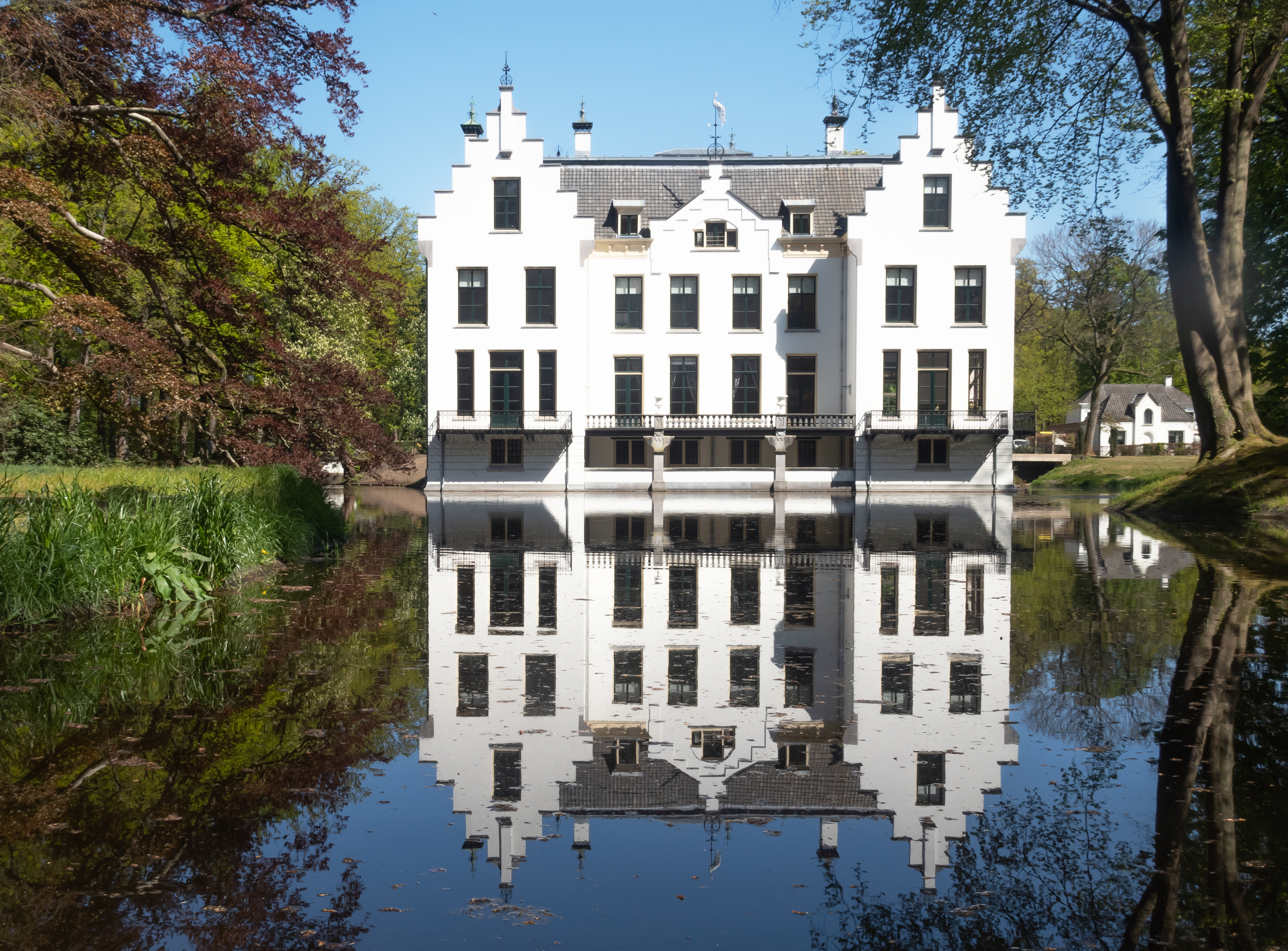
Castle Staverden

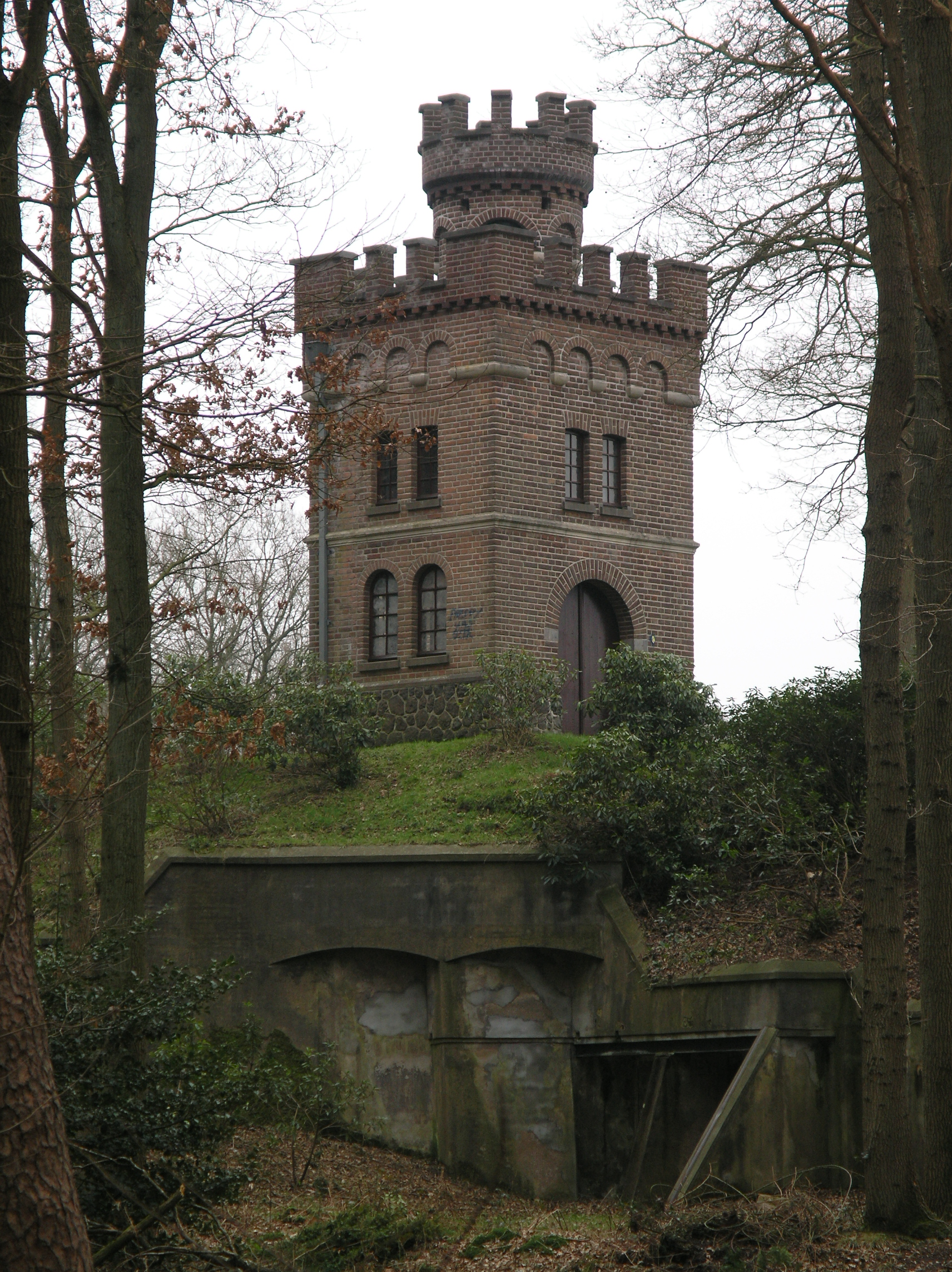
Ermelo water tower

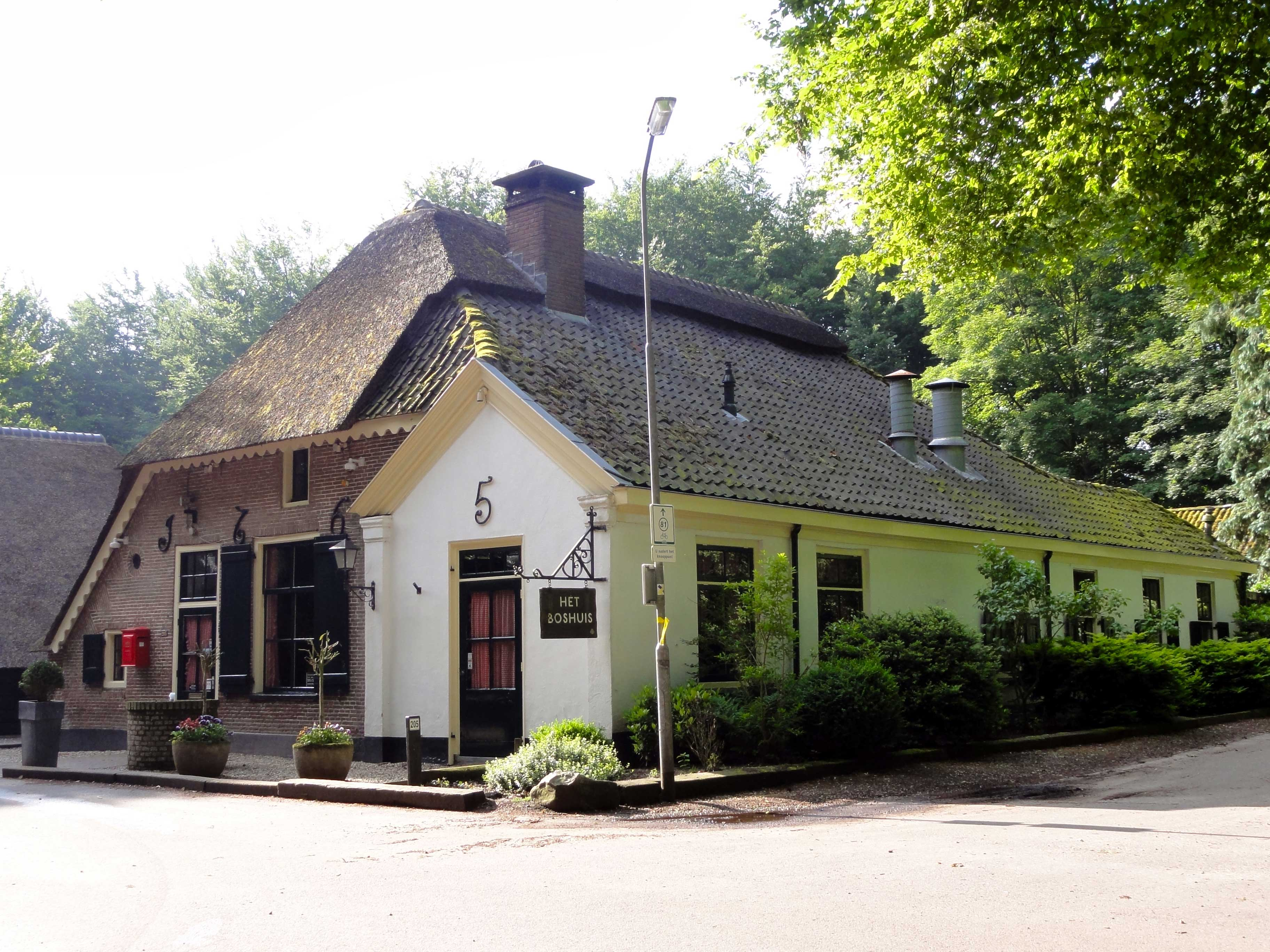
"Het Boshuis" in Drie
