= Cohors III Aquitanorum equitata c.R. =

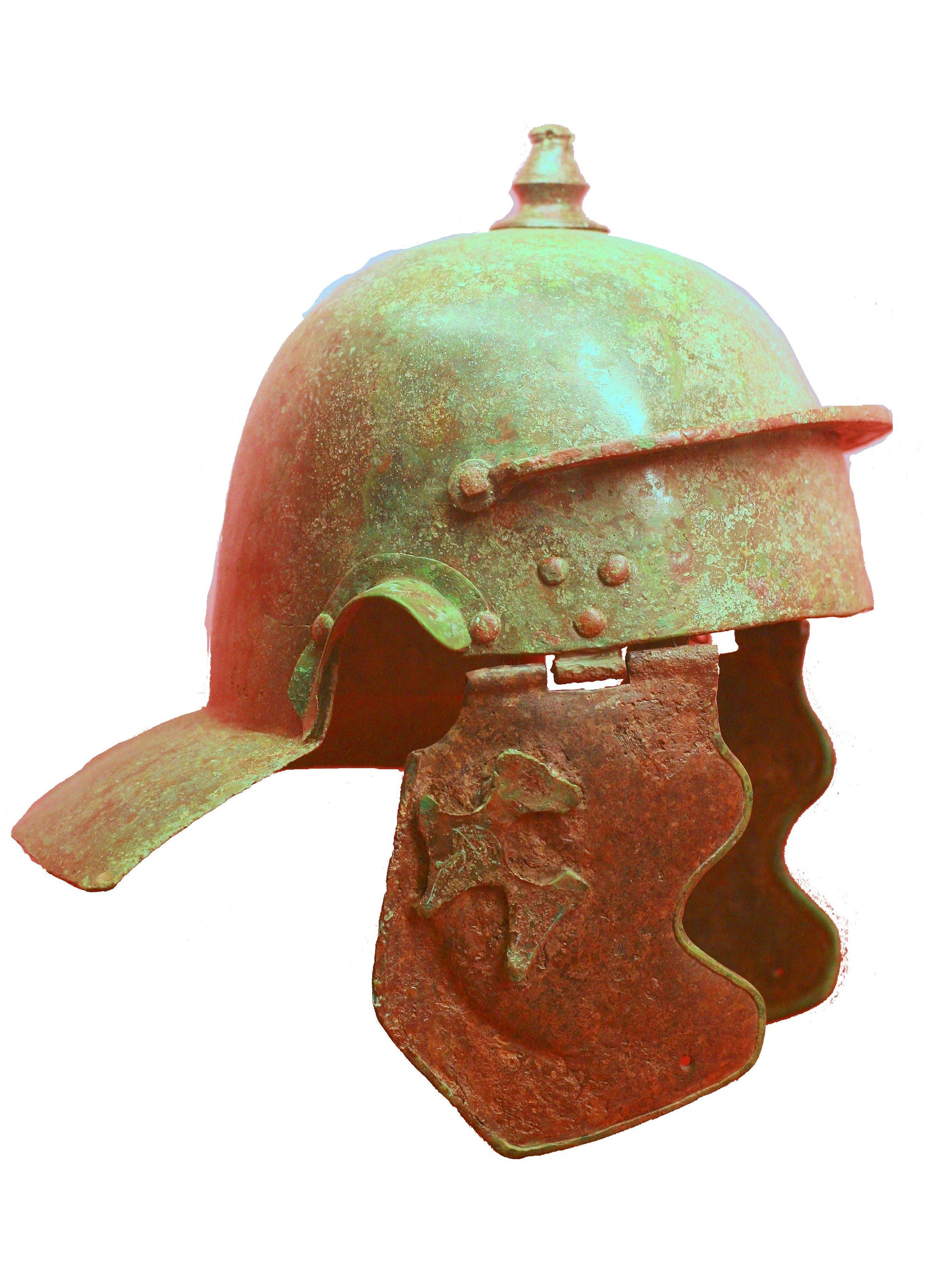
- Roman infantry helmet (late 1st century)
- Active: early 1st century to at least 244
- Country: Roman Empire
- Type: Roman auxiliary cohort
- Role: infantry/cavalry
- Size: 600 men (480 infantry, 120 cavalry)
- Garrison/HQ: Germania Superior 74–244

Cohors tertia Aquitanorum equitata civium Romanorum ("3rd part-mounted Cohort of Aquitani Roman citizens") was a Roman auxiliary mixed infantry and cavalry regiment. It may have been originally raised in Gallia Aquitania in the reign of founder-emperor Augustus after the revolt of the Aquitani was suppressed in 26 BC. Alternatively, it may have been raised by emperor Claudius (r. 41–54) to replace regiments stationed in the newly annexed province of Britannia. Unlike most Gauls, the Aquitani were not Celtic-speaking but spoke Aquitanian, a now extinct non Indo-European language closely related to Basque.

The regiment first appears in the datable epigraphic record in Germania Superior (Pfalz-Alsace) in 74 AD. It remained based in Germania Superior and Sardinia. Its last datable attestation is an altar dedicated in 244–9. The regiment's inscriptions have been found at the following Roman forts: Echzell; Ardara (Sardinia; I cent. AD); Neckarburken; Obenburg; Oehringen (198); Osterburken (150, 223–35, 244–9); Stockstadt am Main; Wimpfen.

The name and origin of one praefectus (regimental commander) survives, P. Allius Proculus from the city of Rome. The names of one centurio (infantry officer) (c150) and three decuriones (cavalry officer, commander of a turma) survive, as do that of a custos armorum (weapons officer) and one medicus (chief medical officer) (198). One caligatus and one miles (common soldier) are attested. The last one, Orcoeta son of Biho, was in Ardara's fort and came from Convenae people (French Basque region).

The honorific title civium Romanorum (c.R. for short) was normally awarded by the emperor for valour to an auxiliary regiment as a whole. The award would include the grant of Roman citizenship to all the regiment's men, but not to subsequent recruits to the regiment. The regiment, however, would retain the prestigious title in perpetuity. Until 212, only a minority of the empire's inhabitants (inc. all Italians) held full Roman citizenship. The rest were denoted peregrini, a second-class status. Since the legions admitted only citizens, peregrini could only enlist in the auxilia. Citizenship carried a number of tax and other privileges and was highly sought after. It could also be earned by serving the minimum 25-year term in the auxilia.

== See also ==
- List of Roman auxiliary regiments
