= Speuld =

- Hamlet
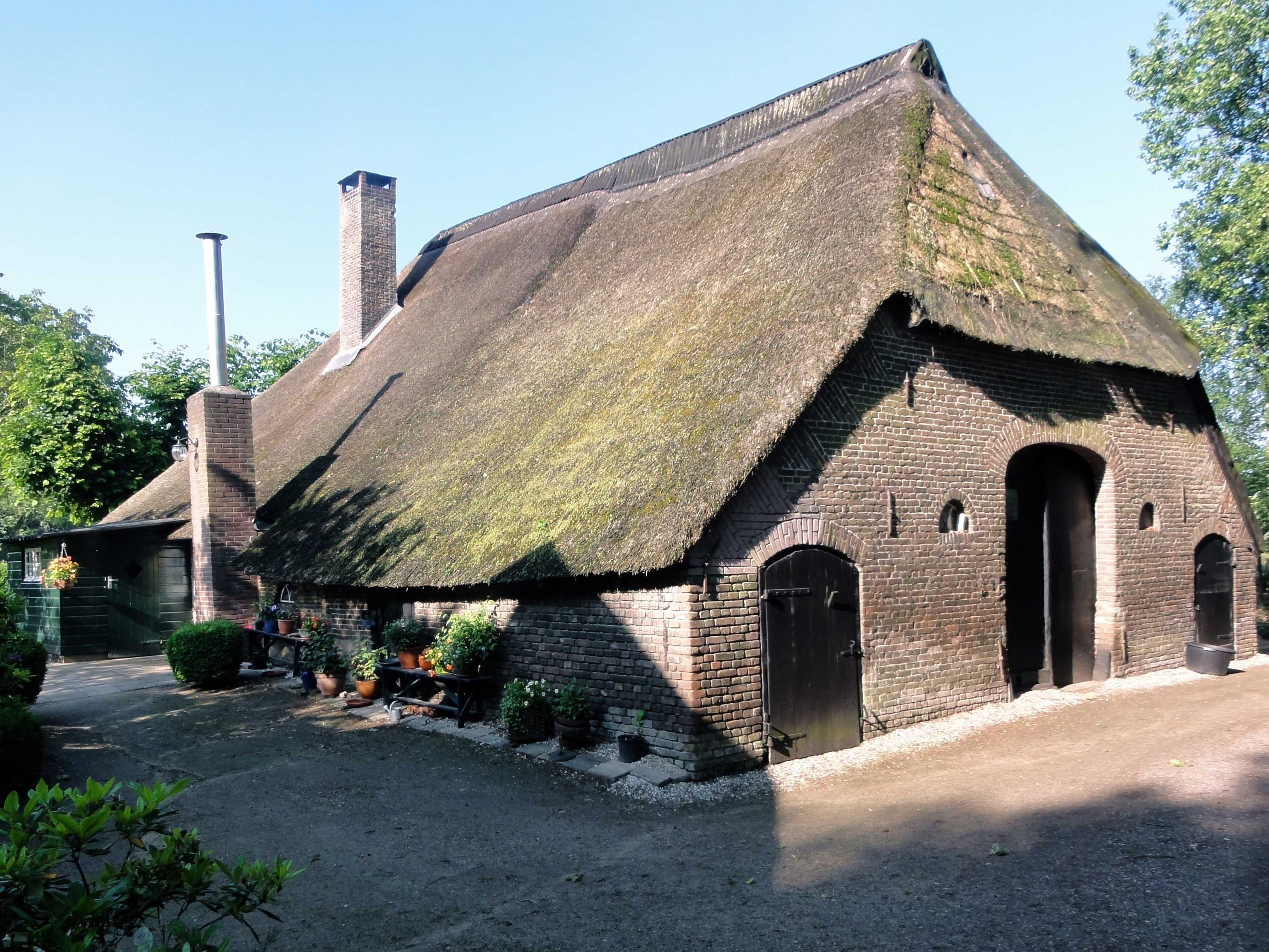
- Farm in Speuld

- Location in the Netherlands Speuld (Netherlands)
- Coordinates: 52.2700°N 5.7119°E
- Country: Netherlands
- Province: Gelderland
- Municipality: Ermelo

Area
  - Total: 2.47 km^{2} (0.95 sq mi)
- Elevation: 16 m (52 ft)

Population (2021)
  - Total: 420
  - Density: 170/km^{2} (440/sq mi)
- Time zone: UTC+1 (CET)
  - Summer (DST): UTC+2 (CEST)
- Postal code: 3852
- Dialing code: 0341

Speuld is a hamlet in the municipality of Ermelo in the province of Gelderland, the Netherlands.

It was first mentioned in 1313 as Arnoldus de Spelde, and means hill with wood similar to the English Speldhurst. The postal authorities have placed it under Ermelo. In 1840, it was home to 83 people.

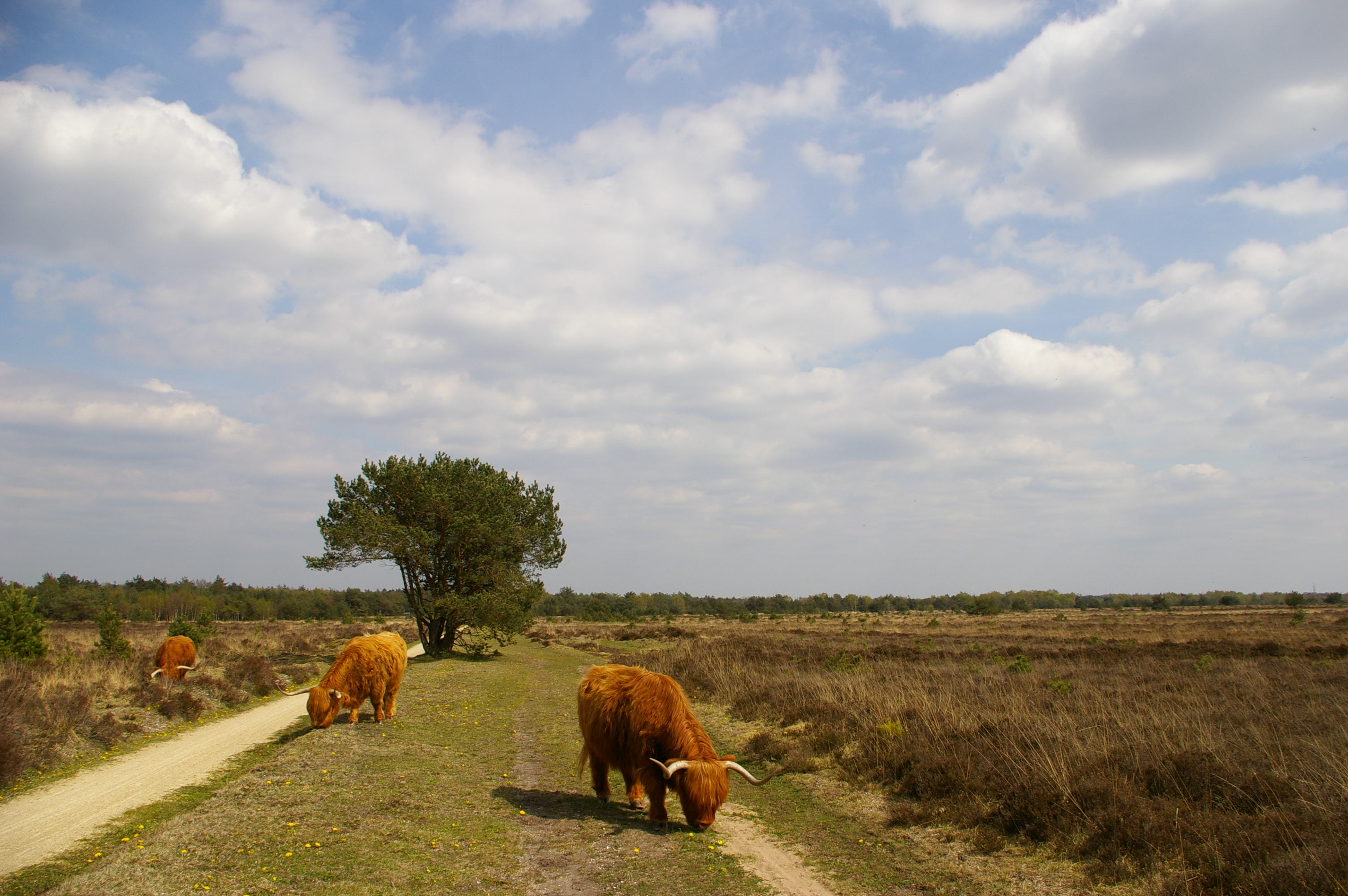
Speulderveld, near Speuld
