= Limes Gate Dalkingen =

Ancient Roman gate in southwest Germany

- Limestor Dalkingen (German)
- Interactive map of Limes Gate Dalkingen
- 48°55′36.7″N 10°9′20.2″E
- Type: Triumphal monument/border crossing
- Location: Dalkingen
- Region: Raetia
- Part of: Upper Germanic-Rhaetian Limes

History
- Built: around 160 CE
- Abandoned: around 233/234 CE

Site notes
- Material: a) Timber b) Stone
- Elevation: 445 m (1,460 ft)
- Area: a) 13.3 m × 14.5 m, timber construction phase b) 12.6 m × 9.3 m, stone construction phase
- Condition: Masonry conserved and restored
- 1. Recorded in ORL Wp 12/81 (RLK).; 2. Altitude as above NHN.; 3. Neighboured by Fort Buch to the southwest and Halheim Fort to the northeast.

The Limes Gate in Dalkingen is a unique Roman triumphal monument on the Upper Germanic-Rhaetian Limes and is one of its most impressive ruins. Since 2005, the ancient border passage, which was developed into a triumphal gate under Emperor Caracalla, is a UNESCO World Heritage Site, together with the entire Roman Limes complex in Germany. It is also part of the open-air museum of the Rhaetian Limes, which was established in 1972 and also includes the nearby Buch fort and its civilian settlement. The gate, which was declared a cultural monument in 2006, is located between the villages of Schwabsberg and Dalkingen in the Ostalbkreis district of Baden-Württemberg.

== Location ==
In antiquity, the gate must have been visible from afar, as it was erected in an exposed position on a hilltop. Today, the field and hiking trail from Schwabsberg to Dalkingen, which takes the course of the Limes, passes to the north of this former border crossing. The actual façade of the gatehouse was located to the south. Travellers who wanted to leave the territory of the Roman Empire to reach the free, unoccupied part of Germania (Germania magna) came from there. For many of them, Buch fort, located around two kilometres to the south-west, with its civilian settlement (vicus), was certainly the last stop before the border. As the rich and often valuable artefacts found there show, the inhabitants of Buch must have achieved some prosperity through border trade.

The Limes Gate in its historical surroundings

== Research history ==
As the field name "Mäuerlesbüsche" shows, knowledge of an ancient building near Dalkingen has survived for a remarkably long time. The remains of the gate were visible for many years. The first known excavation of this site took place in the early 19th century. In 1873, the archaeologist Ernst von Herzog (1834-1911) visited the site as part of his surveying work on the Roman border. The artefacts recovered at the time are considered lost. In addition to pottery, he found a bronze fragment of a female statuette. His report, published in 1880, also documents that the ‘remains of a tower’ had been excavated and that "masses" of rubble were still lying around. He also reported on a slab stolen from the mound of rubble in 1873, which was used secondarily as an entrance step to the Dalkingen churchyard. In the course of his work on the Limes Gate, archaeologist Dieter Planck succeeded in recovering this limestone slab in 1974. After the paving of Kirchstraße was completed in 1962, the 1.23 × 1.21 metre piece had been replaced by an exposed aggregate concrete slab and deposited behind the cemetery. The piece, which was not examined in detail until 2010, has a dovetailed hole on one side. It may have served as a pedestal for a statue of the emperor, which was placed inside the triumphal arch-like Limes Gate.

In the spring of 1885, further excavations were carried out at the Limes Gate under the state curator Eduard Paulus the Younger (1837-1907), with the former general chief of staff of the Württemberg army, Eduard von Kallée (1818-1888), an antique enthusiast, taking over the visual documentation. This was followed in 1886 by a report by the archaeological pioneer Karl August von Cohausen (1812-1894), who also presented the first reconstruction of the Limes Gate. No further scientific investigations were carried out afterwards. The archaeologist Oscar Paret (1889-1972), who in 1934 reviewed the current state of research for the publication of the Limeswerk, did not rely on Paulus' findings and Cohausen's publication for reasons that are inexplicable today, but instead drew up a different plan of the site without carrying out his own excavations. As a result, he imagined the Limes gate to be a field post, a small fort that corresponded structurally to the neighbouring fortifications. Planck assumed that Paret was unable to reproduce the older research results. The consequence of this entry in the Limeswerk was that it was published for decades that the function and significance of the structure had not been correctly recognised in 1885/1886.

It was only in the course of land consolidation that the Baden-Württemberg State Office for the Protection of Monuments carried out another comprehensive assessment from 25 September to 23 November 1973 and from 1 June to 30 July 1974 under the direction of Planck. At the time, there was a risk that the structure, which was still visible as a two metre high mound of rubble, would be bulldozed in the course of road works. With the help of modern working methods, the building could then be interpreted as a repeatedly remodelled Limes gate with adjoining rooms for a border guard.

In 1975, the restored site was opened to the public as part of the European Year of Monuments and Sites. As the Dalkingen Limes Gate is the only structure on the Upper Germanic-Rhaetian Limes to have been developed into a monument with a triumphal arch-like façade and its final design can presumably be seen in the context of a datable visit by Emperor Caracalla, it acquired a special status among the ancient legacies in the immediate Roman border region early on. According to a fragmentarily preserved inscriptional source, the Acta Fratrum Arvalium, the emperor crossed the Rhaetian border on 11 August 213 in battle against the Germanic peoples. Research has repeatedly linked this border crossing with the Limes Gate in Dalkingen. Among the proponents of this theory in 1988 were the Swiss archaeologists Walter Drack (1917-2000) and Rudolf Fellmann (1925-2013), although the archaeologist Harald von Petrikovits (1911-2010) also opposed this idea in the 1980s.

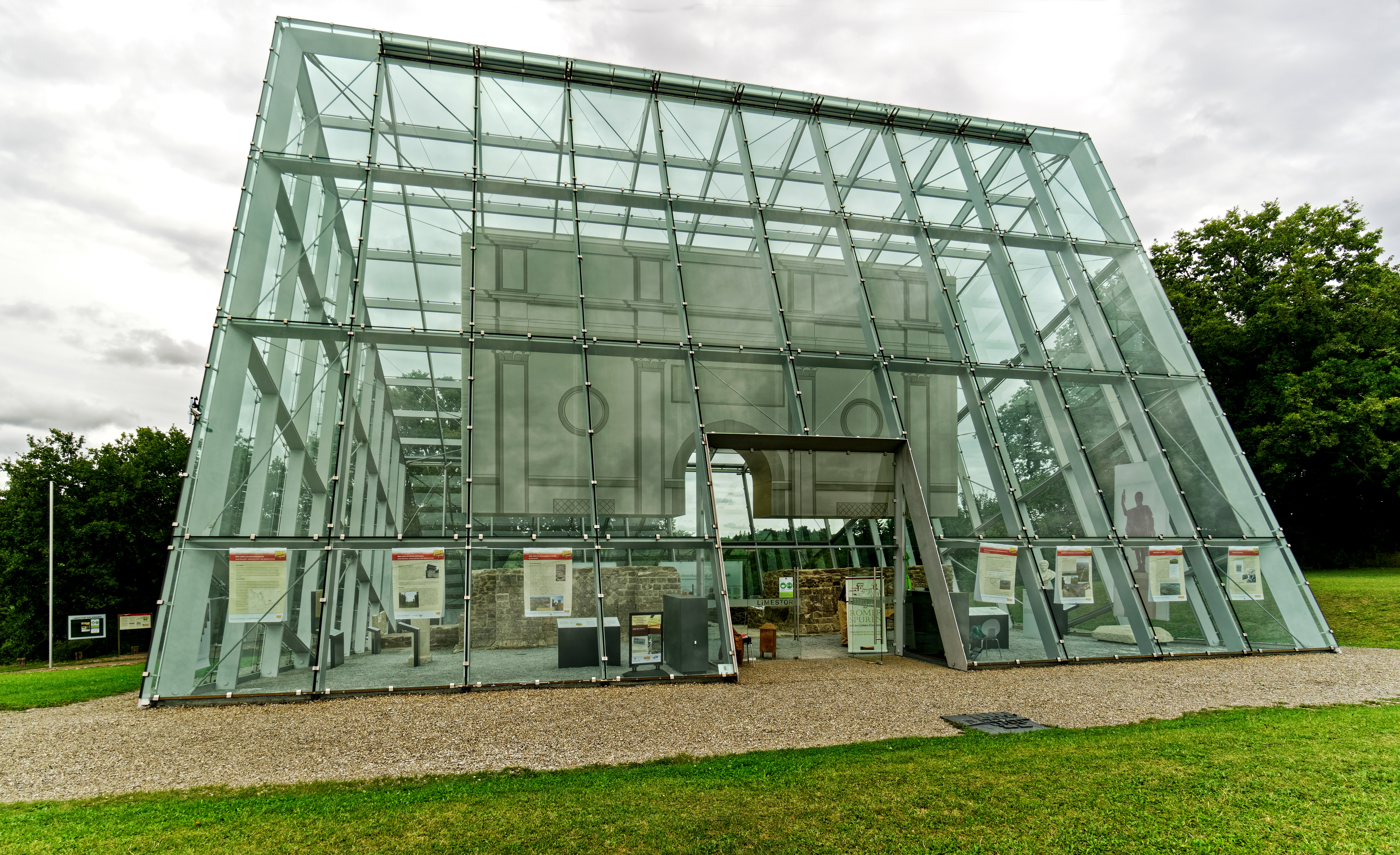
The protective structure built in 2010

When an extensive general refurbishment was completed in 2000, the gate was once again opened to the public in the presence of Planck. In January 2003, the school and culture committee of the Ostalbkreis district voted in favour of the future preservation of the site under a protective structure. In 2005, together with the entire Upper Germanic-Rhaetian Limes, it was declared a World Heritage Site and in 2006 the Stuttgart Regional Council declared the Limes Gate a specially protected cultural monument. The costs for the protective structure, totalling 1,870,000 euros, were funded by the European Union, the then Baden-Württemberg State Foundation, the State Office for Monument Preservation, the Baden-Württemberg Monument Foundation and the School and Culture Committee of the Ostalbkreis district. The 16 metre-high steel and glass construction, which cuts through the oldest wooden predecessor of the Limes Gate, encases parts of the more recent antique structure over an area of 23 × 21 metres. The construction work carried out in the summer of 2010 not only protects the covered ancient substance but also reduces the renovation and maintenance costs previously required. The height of the protective structure, which can be accessed during set opening hours and dominates the previously isolated site with its unconventional architectural design, is based on the presumed height of the former Limes gate. Its possible ancient appearance and dimensions are indicated inside the structure with printed fabric panels, which hang in their original size over the preserved stone stumps of the gate.

The Limes Gate before the construction of the protective structure

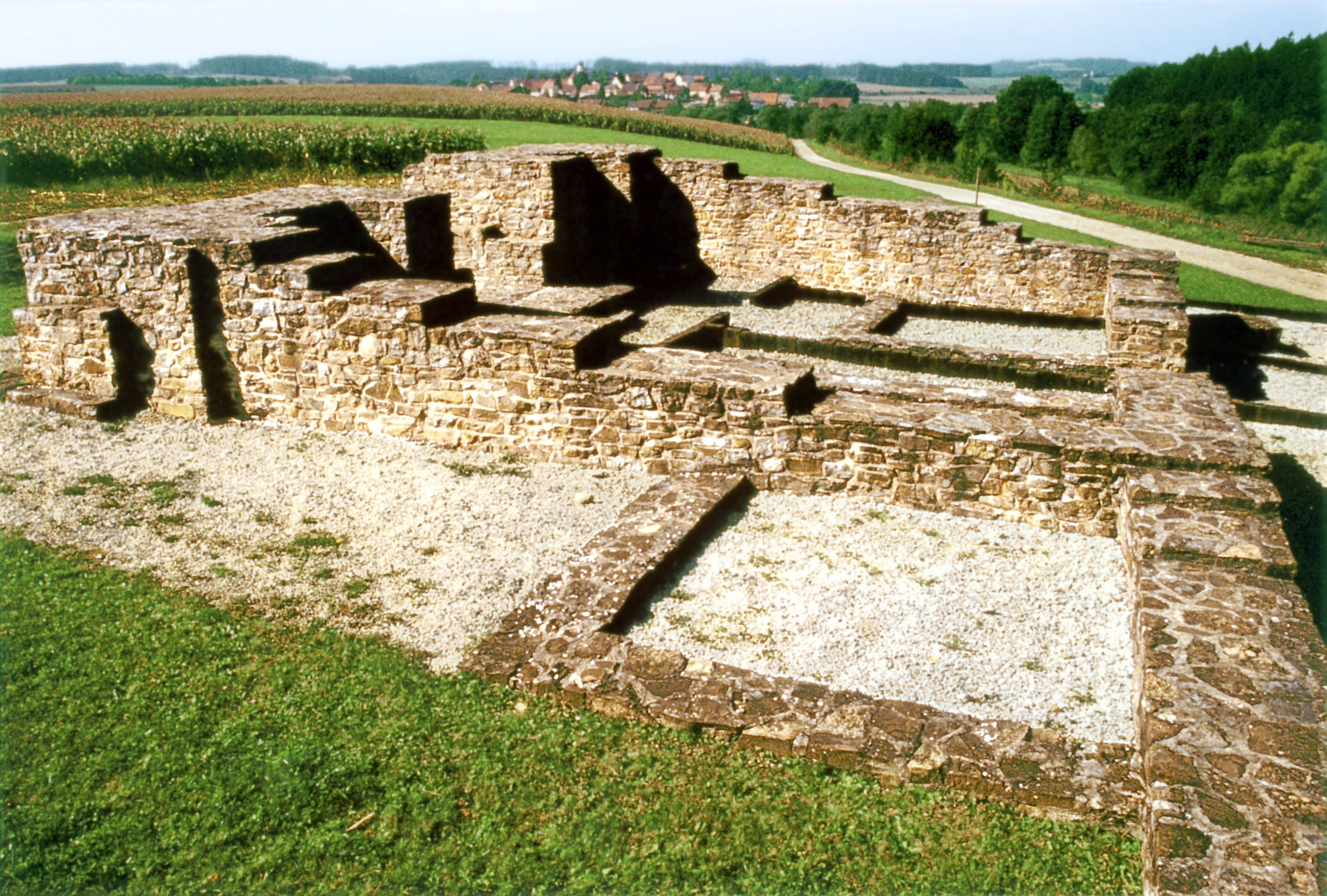
View from the northeast; in the foreground are the foundations of an older Roman stone tower (1995)

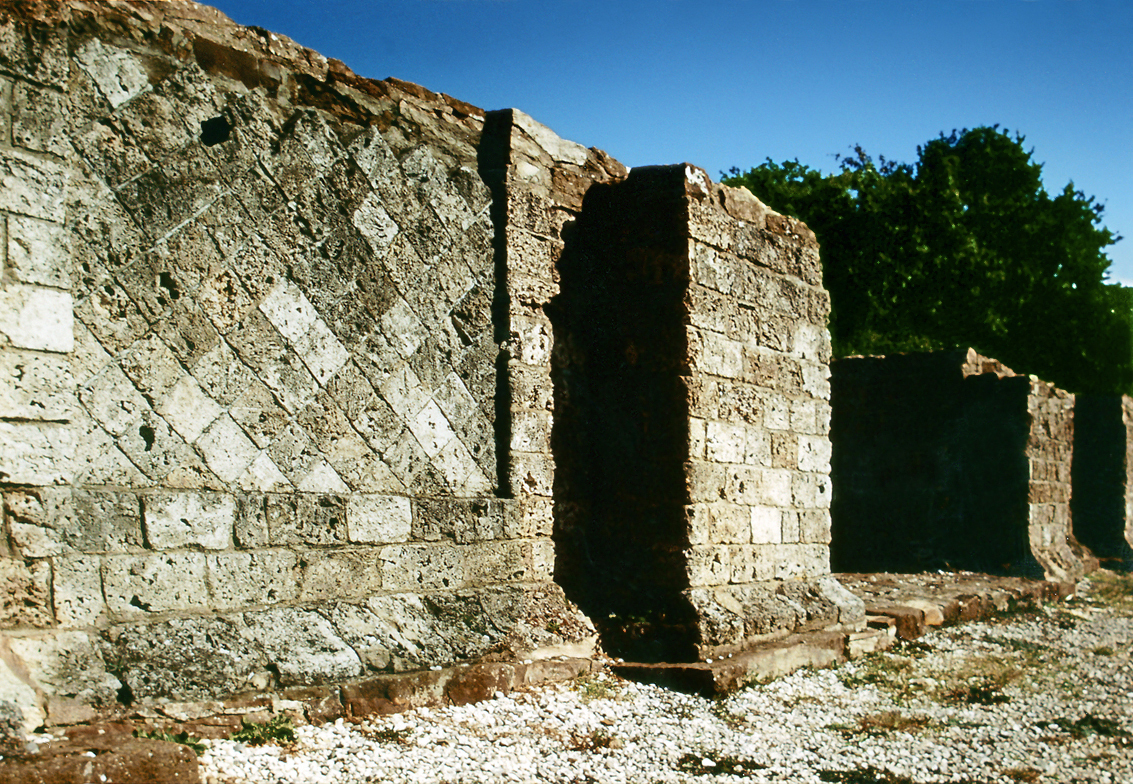
Façade of the Limes Gate with opus reticulatum masonry (1995)

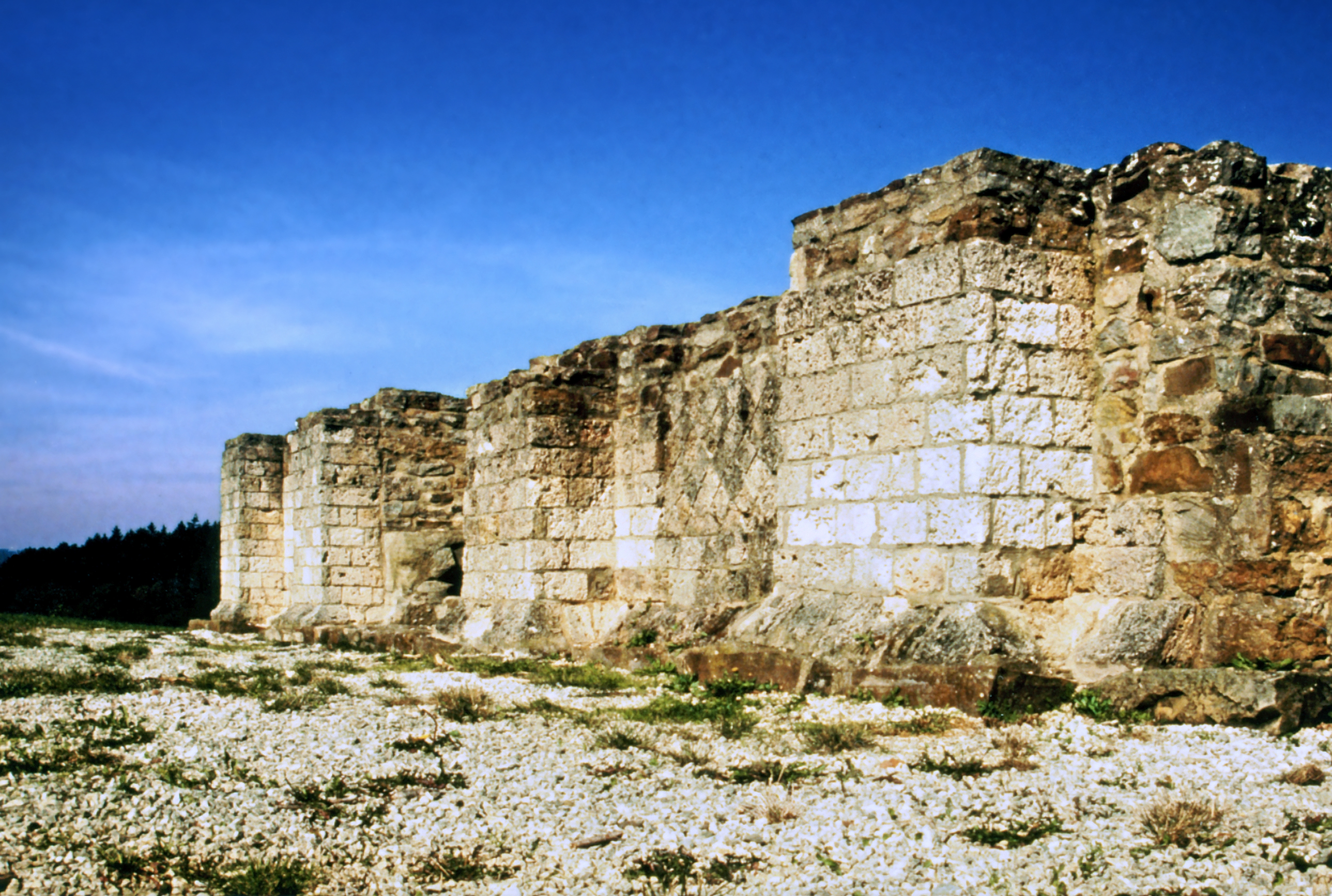
View from southeast (1995)

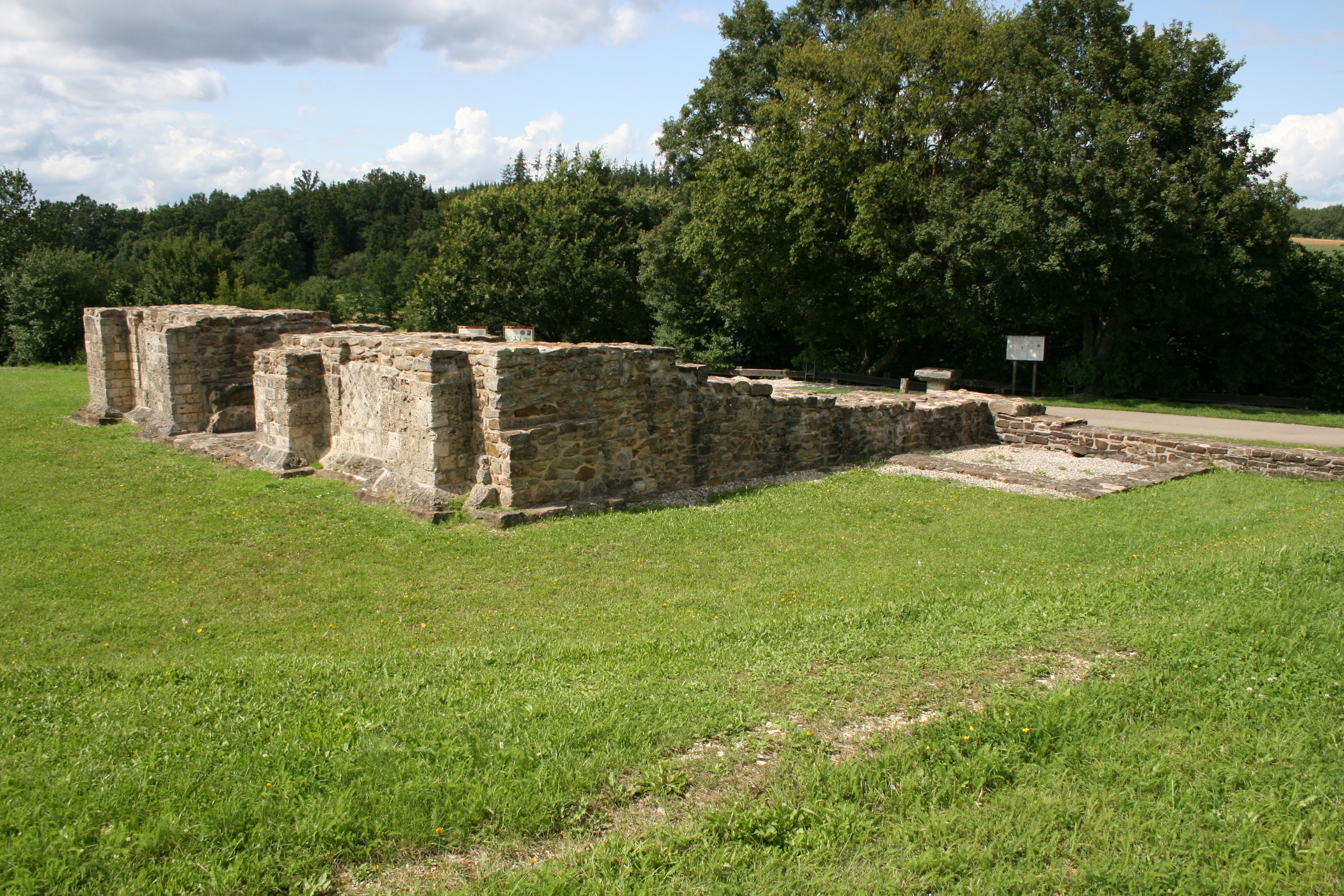
View from southwest (2009)

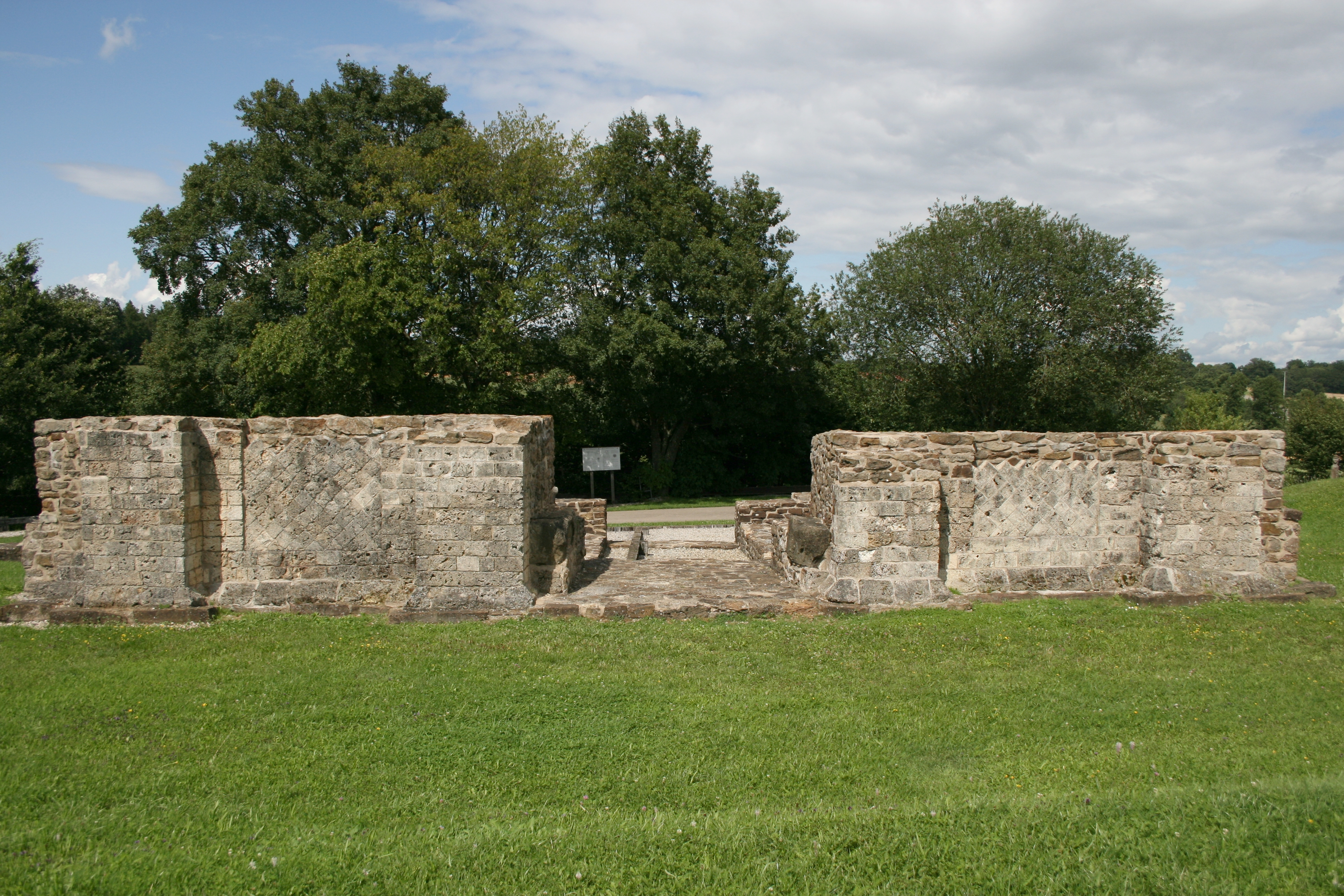
South view 2009; the opus reticulatum masonry is to the left and right of the passageway
The exhibition inside the glass shelter

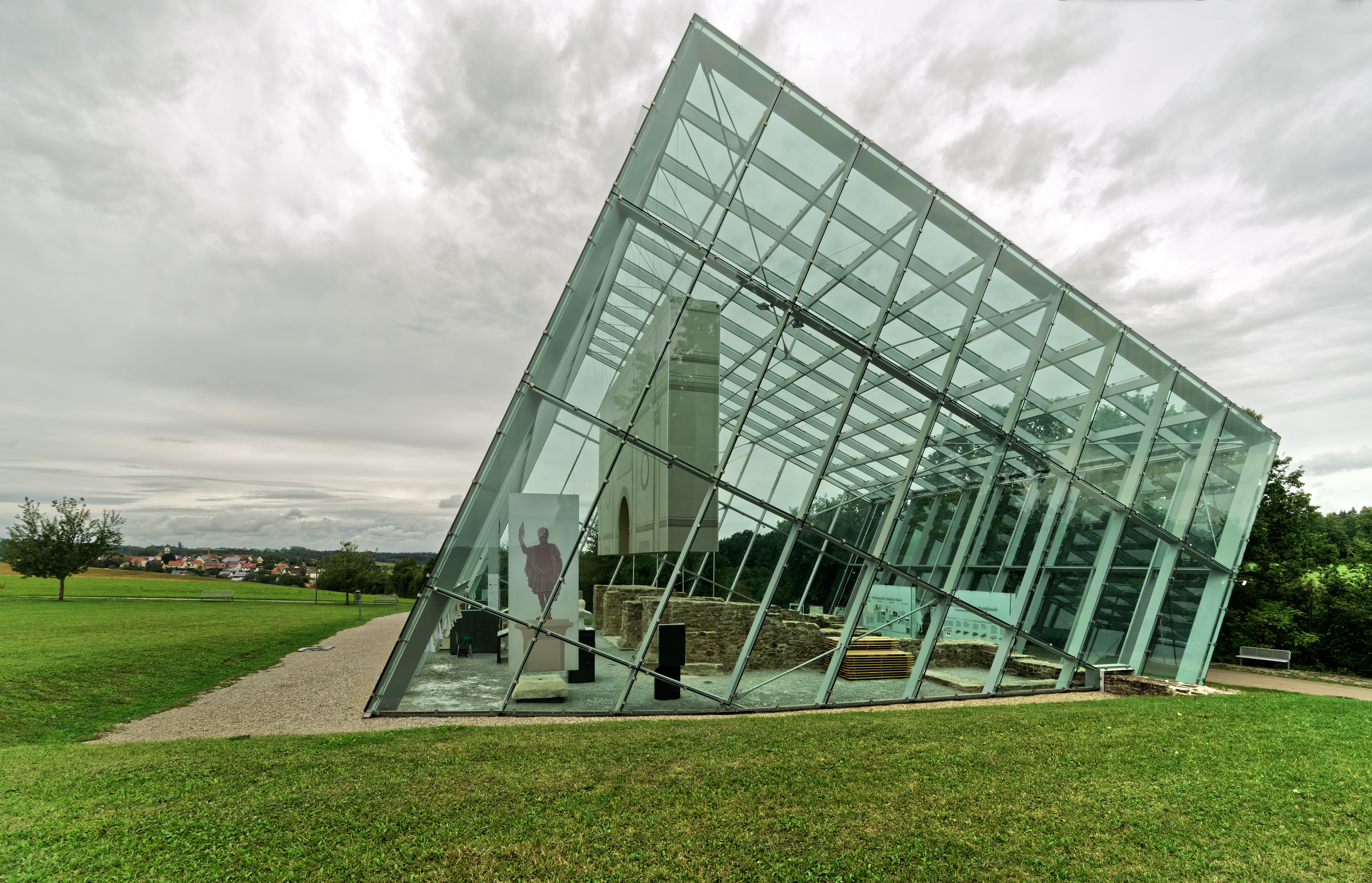
Side view of the shelter; in the background (left) is Dalkingen

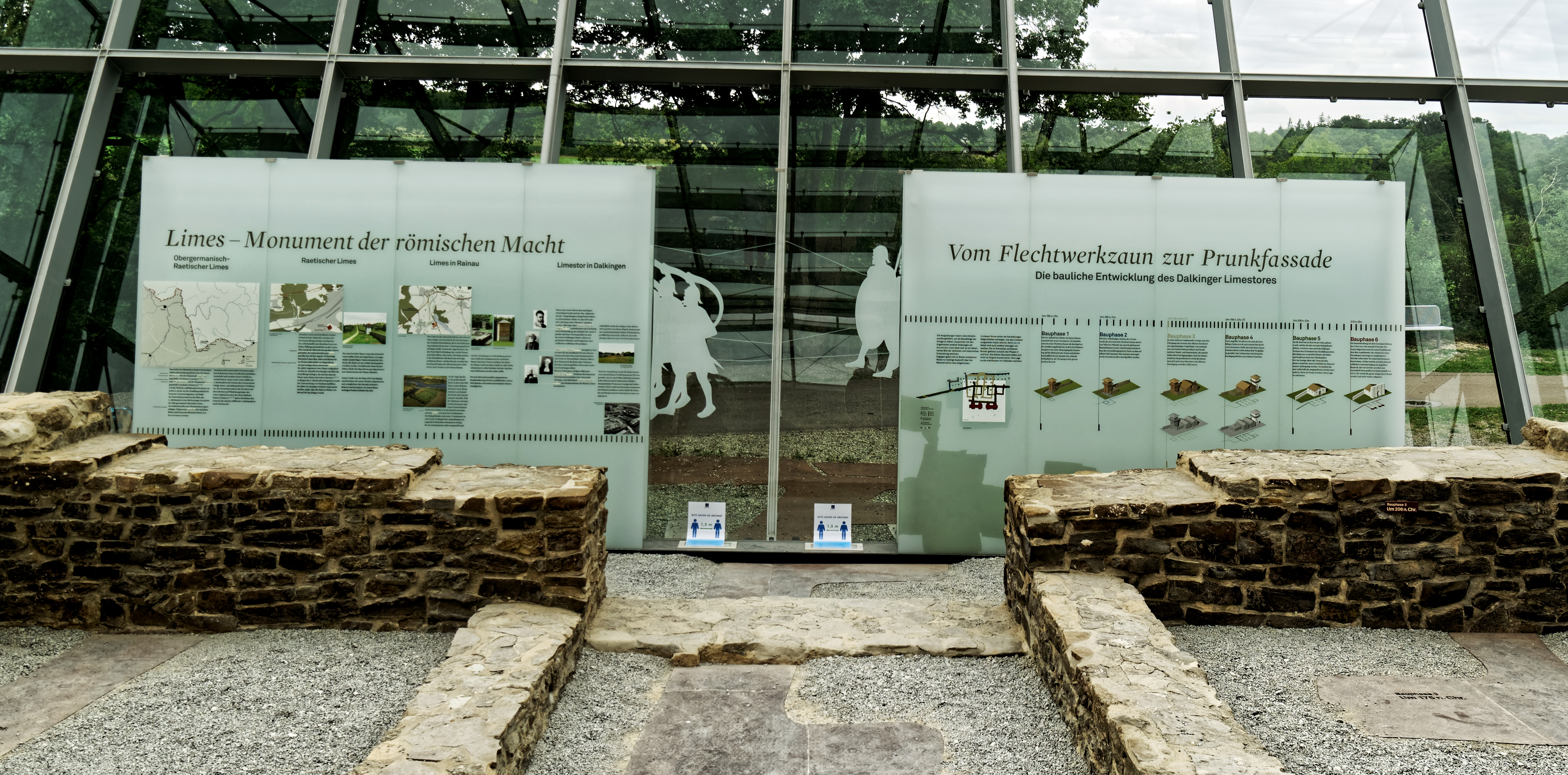
Information boards

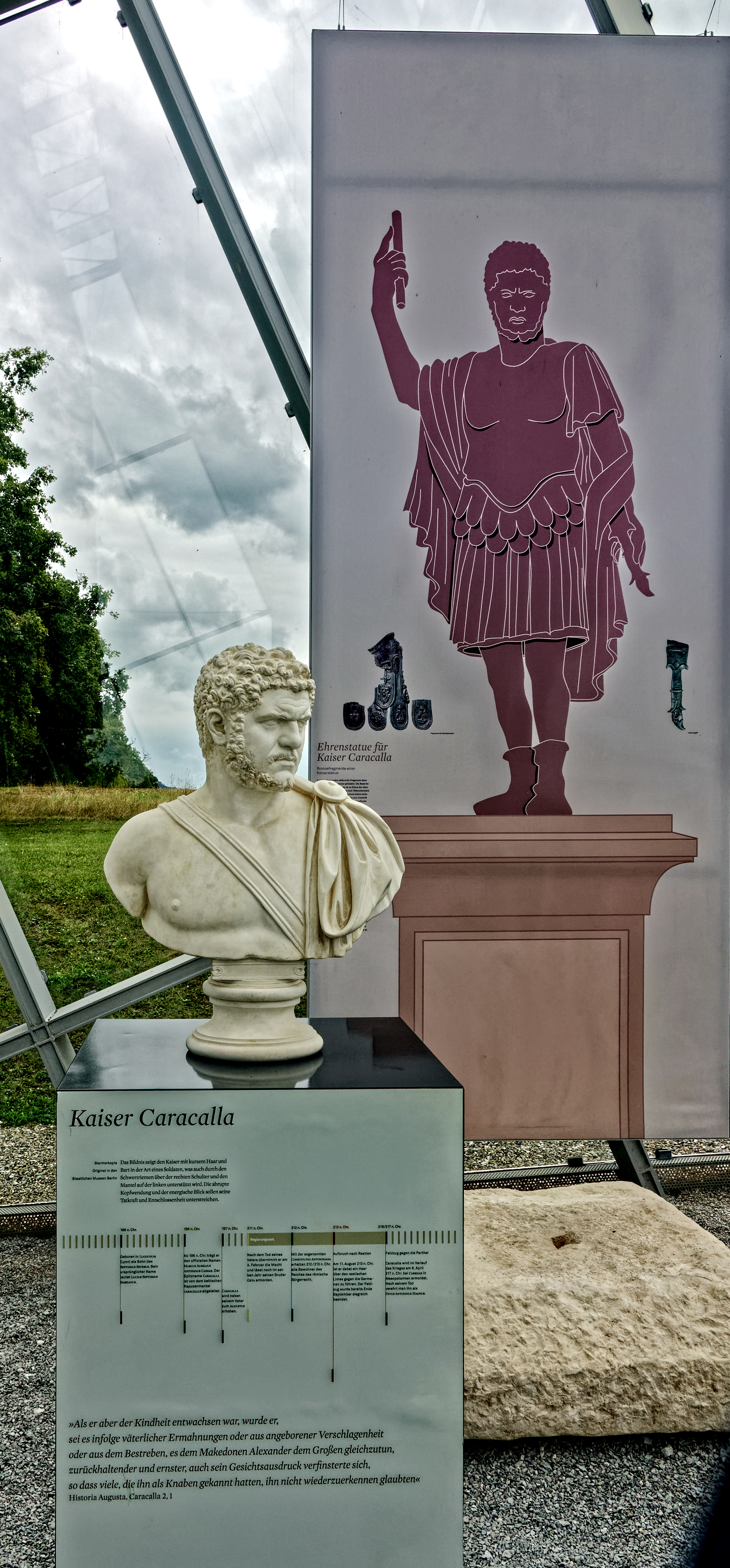
Copy of the bust of Emperor Caracalla

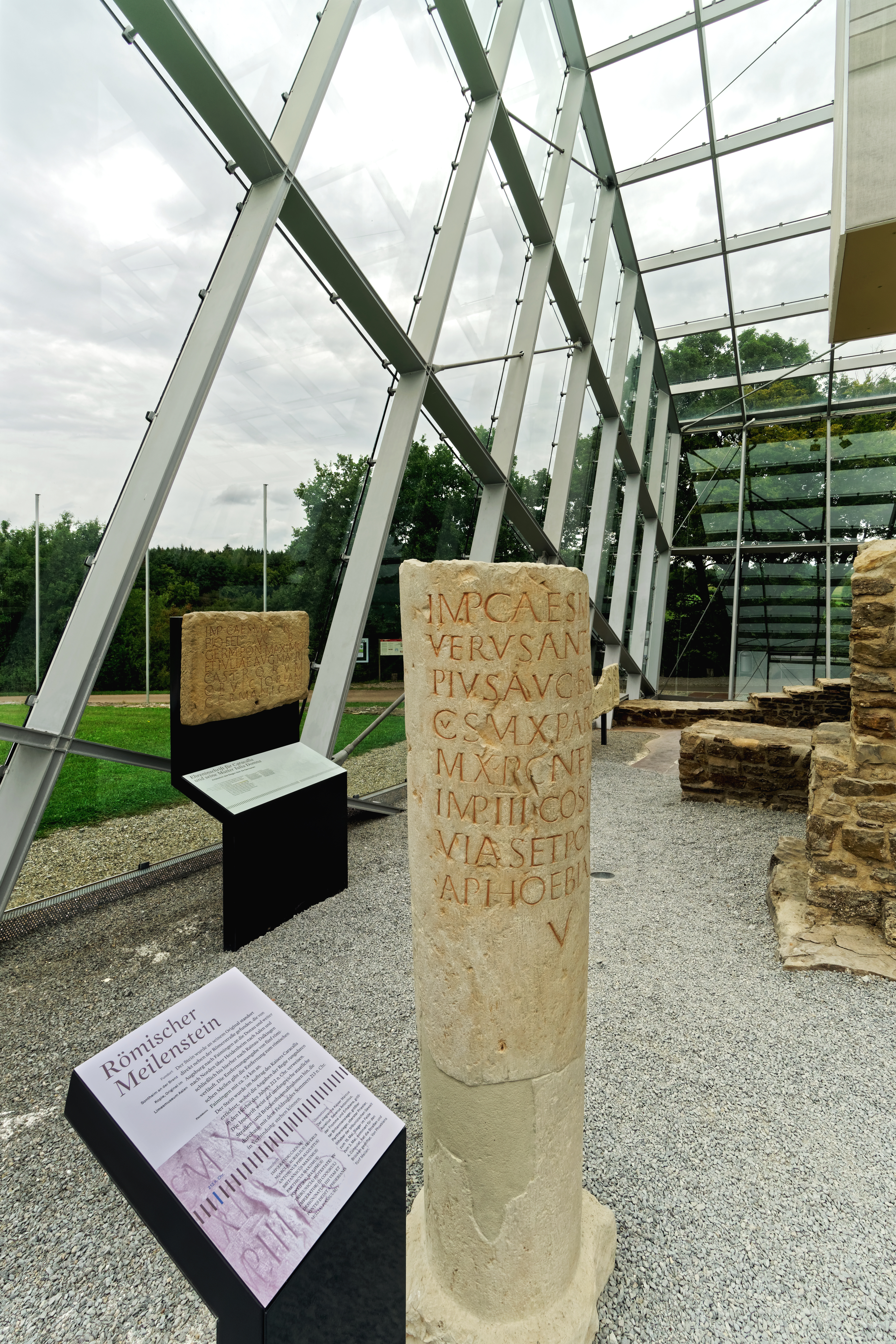
Copy of a Roman milestone

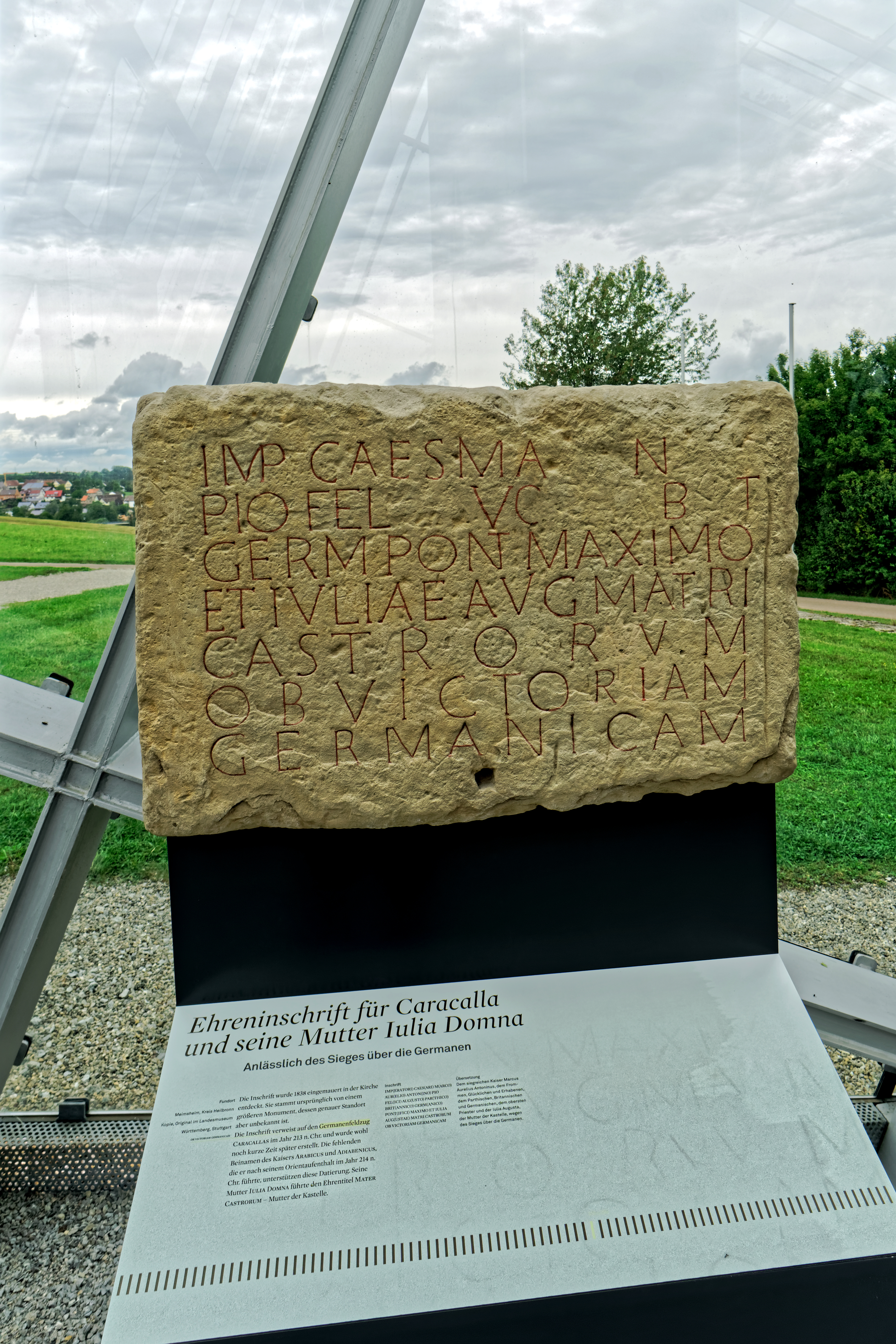
Copy of an inscription in honour of Caracalla

== Construction history ==
In total, the archaeologists were able to identify six consecutive construction phases on the unusually well-preserved remains of the building, which also revealed the different construction periods of the Rhaetian Wall. The guards for the gatehouse and the troops who manned the watchtowers on the same site were most certainly provided by the nearby Buch fort.

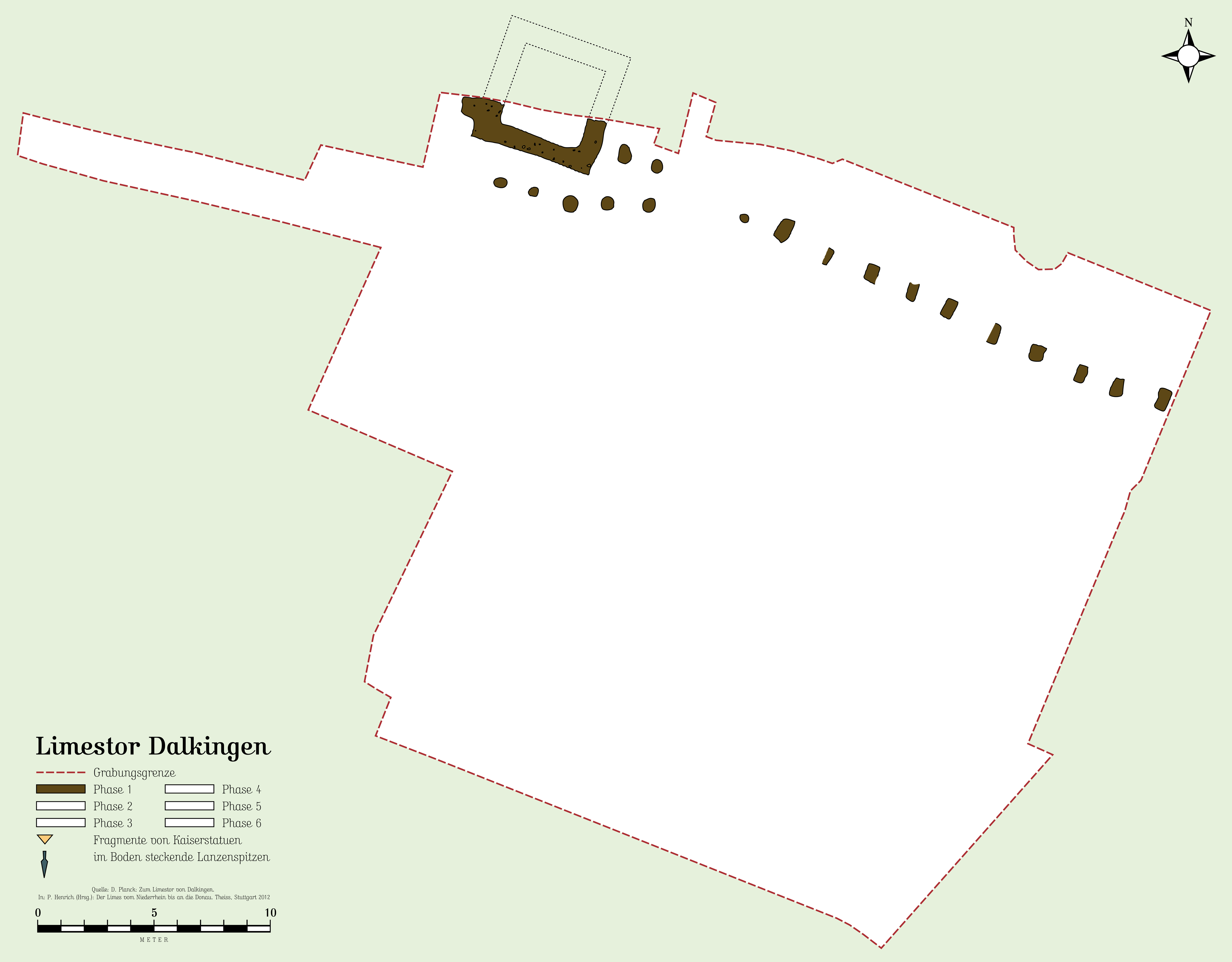
Phase 1

=== Phase 1 ===
It is possible that the Roman military first became active at this site around 160 CE. The dendrochronologically analysable material from the camp village (vicus) of Rainau-Buch, around 2.1 kilometres away, could support this idea. In addition to Planck, the Bavarian state conservator C. Sebastian Sommer (1956-2021) also supported this dating approach concerning the construction of the entire Rhaetian and "Anterior Limes". The earliest absolute dating known from the Buch camp village is a finding dating from May/June 161 CE at the latest. As the isolated post holes found suggest, a Roman construction team initially erected a simple wattle fence along the intended boundary line as an obstacle to approach. This fence was located in the area of the subsequently erected gate, around two to five metres deeper in the Barbaricum than the more recent Rhaetian Wall. Immediately to the west of the foundations of the Limes gate, a deep post trench was found in a square, which may be the remains of a wooden Limes watchtower measuring around 5.5 × 5.5 metres. The northern half of this tower, which had already been destroyed, could no longer be archaeologically recorded. In front of the north-western and south-eastern flank of this tower, the wattle fence possibly ended, whereby Planck assumed in his more recent considerations that there could have been a narrow wicket gate between the south-eastern flank and the end of the fence there. The post settings found along the south-west side of the tower would thus have obscured the view of the gateway from the south and could be addressed as an additional safety measure.

=== Phase 2 ===
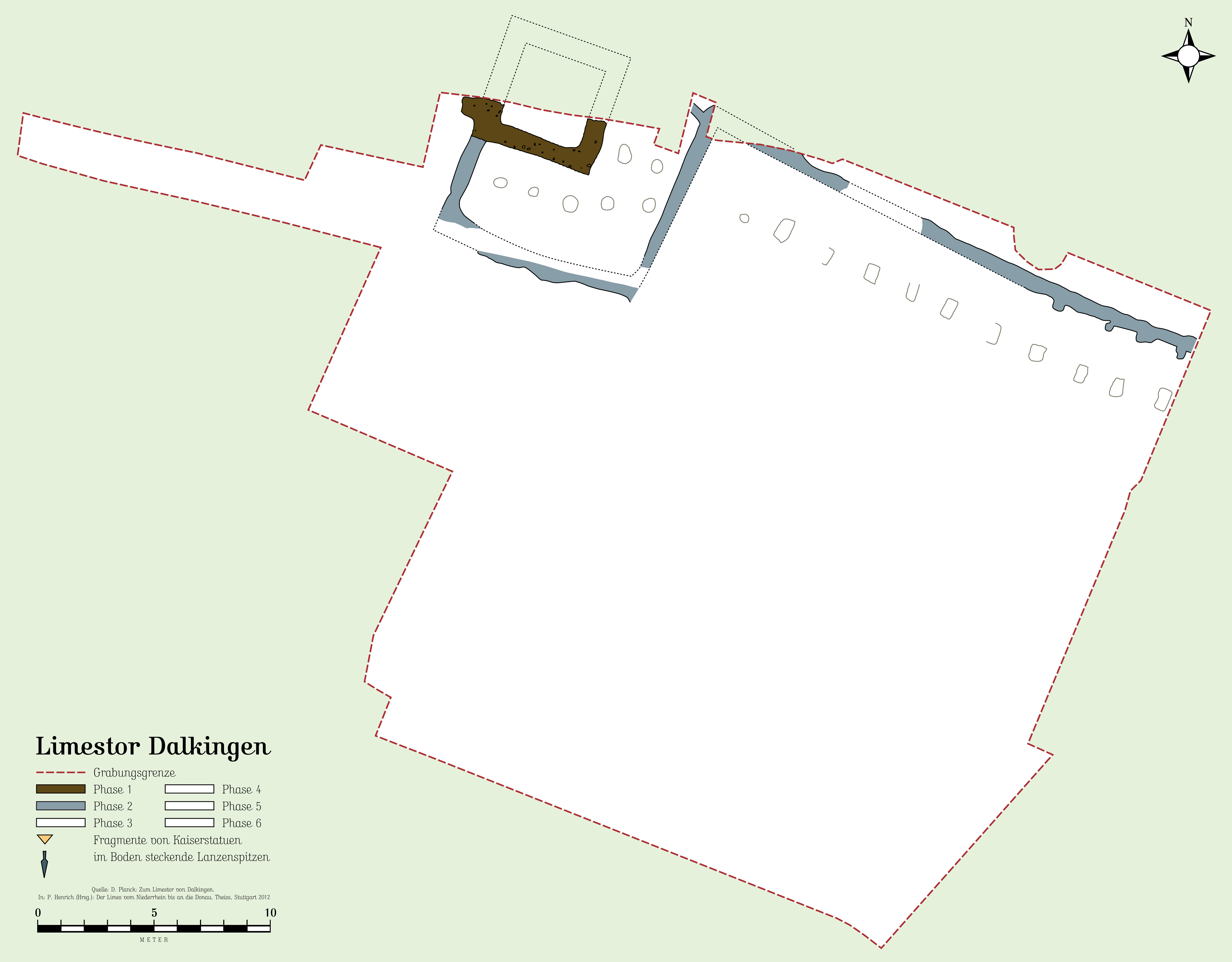
Phase 2

In 1969, semi-circular split oak trunks were recovered as parts of the wooden Limes palisade on the southern edge of Schwabsberg in the area of the Jagst lowlands, which had been marshy since ancient times. Four samples were analysed by the dendrochronologist Ernst Hollstein (1918-1988) in 1975. All samples dated from "late 165, possibly spring 166 CE". In 1974, the palisade in this area was archaeologically excavated again. Seven samples were then sent to the dendrochronologist Bernd Becker for examination. In 1976, he dated the timbers to the year 165 CE. Wood from the Rotenbach Valley near Schwäbisch Gmünd provided suitable chronological information. There, on the border to the province of Germania superior, this wood was used to build a fortification that was probably erected in 164 CE (see Kleindeinbach small fort). The uncovered post pits in the area of the Limes gate also belong to this period. They mark a new construction phase, only a few years after the erection of the wattle and daub fence.

The fence was removed; around three metres to the north, a tightly packed wooden palisade of oak poles was built, for which a narrow trench had to be dug. At regular intervals, the excavators found semicircular indentations on the inside of the trench from a rear reinforcement created with the palisade. In more recent considerations, Planck assumed that the wicket gate had also been converted into a regular border crossing. The palisade ditch coming from the southeast aligned roughly with the eastern corner of the wooden tower. However, like the older wattle fence, it left a passage open between its end and the corner of the tower. The palisade ditch bent at a right angle to the south-west around three and a half metres from the south-eastern flank of the tower and also bypassed the tower at the same distance on its south-western side before leading back to the north-east in parallel alignment with the north-western flank of the tower and connecting to the western corner of the tower. This created an open courtyard around the tower on two sides, which was probably already suited for regular border controls.

=== Phase 3 ===
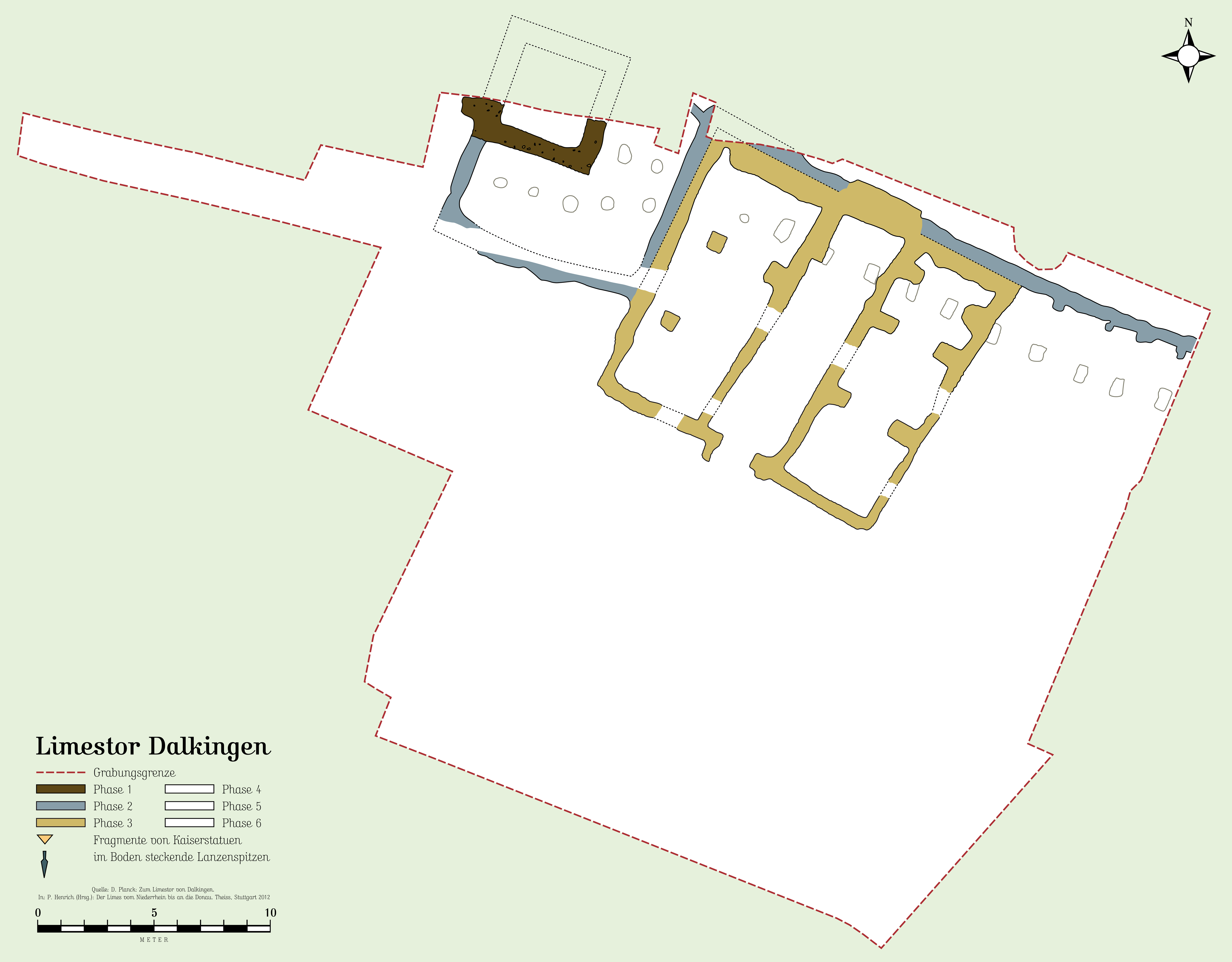
Phase 3

In a further expansion phase - at a later date than the construction of the palisade - a first wooden gateway was erected to the south-east of the tower. In the lowest filling of its post trenches, which were unusually deep at up to 1.1 metre, a well-preserved sestertius from the reign of Emperor Antoninus Pius (138-161) was found alongside some pottery shards. The coin was not particularly worn and had been minted in Rome between 140 and 144 CE. In the past, the datable terra sigillata was also attributed to the first half of the 2nd century.

The 13.3 × 14.5 metres symmetrical wooden building with a largely rectangular floor plan was founded in post pits up to 1.1 metre deep. The wooden structure already had a passage leading from south to north. On both sides of the central passageway, three rooms could be made out in the north-west and four in the south-east. It is possible to imagine a guardroom, parlours and an administrative area for border traffic there. As the findings in the post-trenches suggest, the wooden Limes tower was probably embedded in the new complex and continued to be used. Research has identified certain similarities between the Limes gate and the small milestone forts on Hadrian's Wall in northern England. There were also controlled passages into the unoccupied part. During the excavation, the deep post trenches gave the impression that the logs had been excavated before the stone structure was erected in Phase 5.

It is assumed that a road leading from Fort Aalen via Fort Buch to the Barbaricum was the reason for the construction of the Limes Gate. Planck called this road a main connection to the Aalen military centre. While the course of this military and trade route can be narrowed down in the area of the former Roman Empire, its traces in the unoccupied part of Germania are no longer detectable.

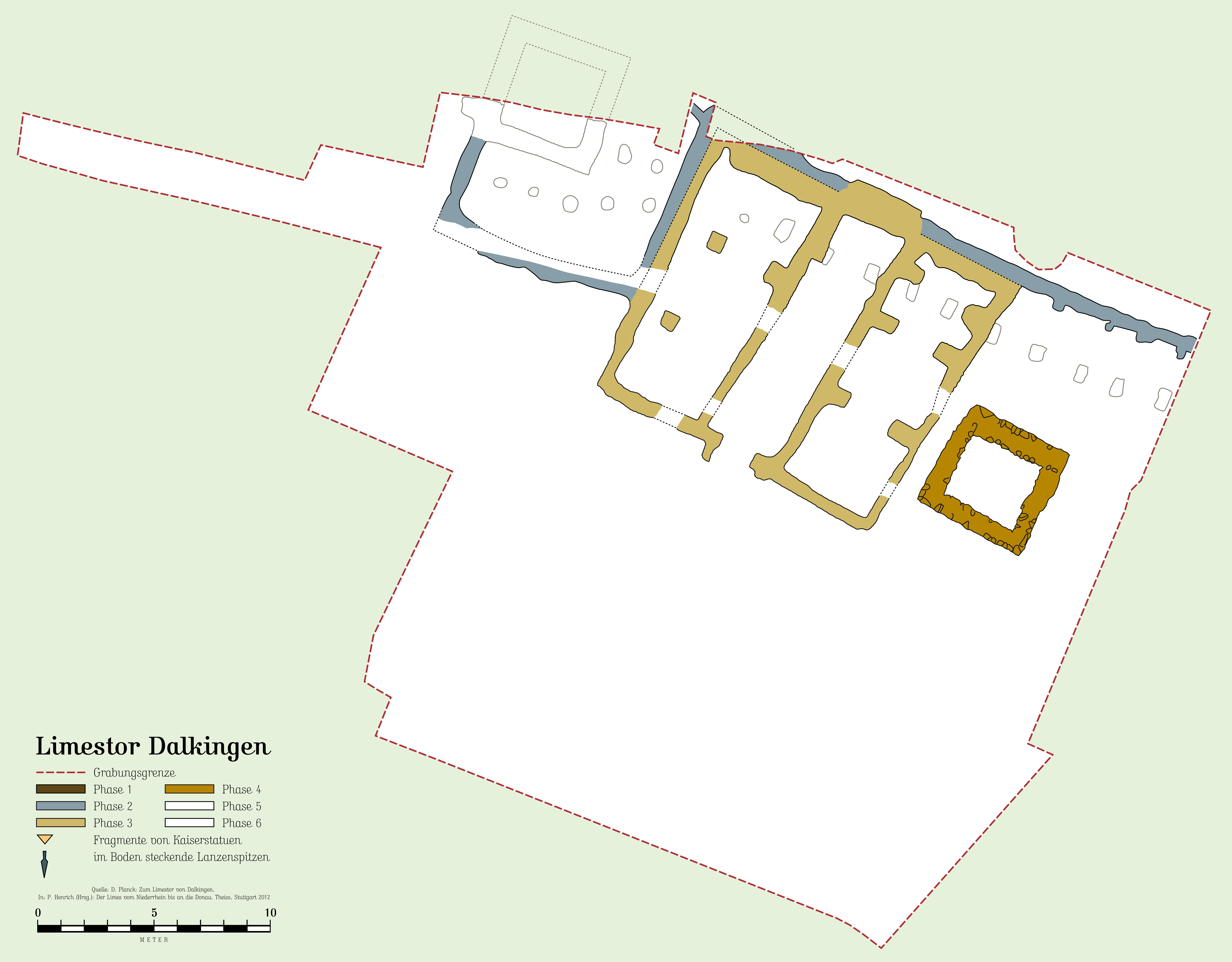
Phase 4

=== Phase 4 ===
The wooden tower had obviously fallen into disrepair, possibly shortly before the turn of the 3rd century. As a replacement, a 5 × 4.8 metres stone foundation was built around seven metres behind the Limes palisade on the south-eastern flank of the Limes gate, which Planck found well-preserved. The rising construction of this tower can either be interpreted as a complete stone tower or as a wooden tower with a stone foundation. The wooden gate structure remained unchanged during this phase.

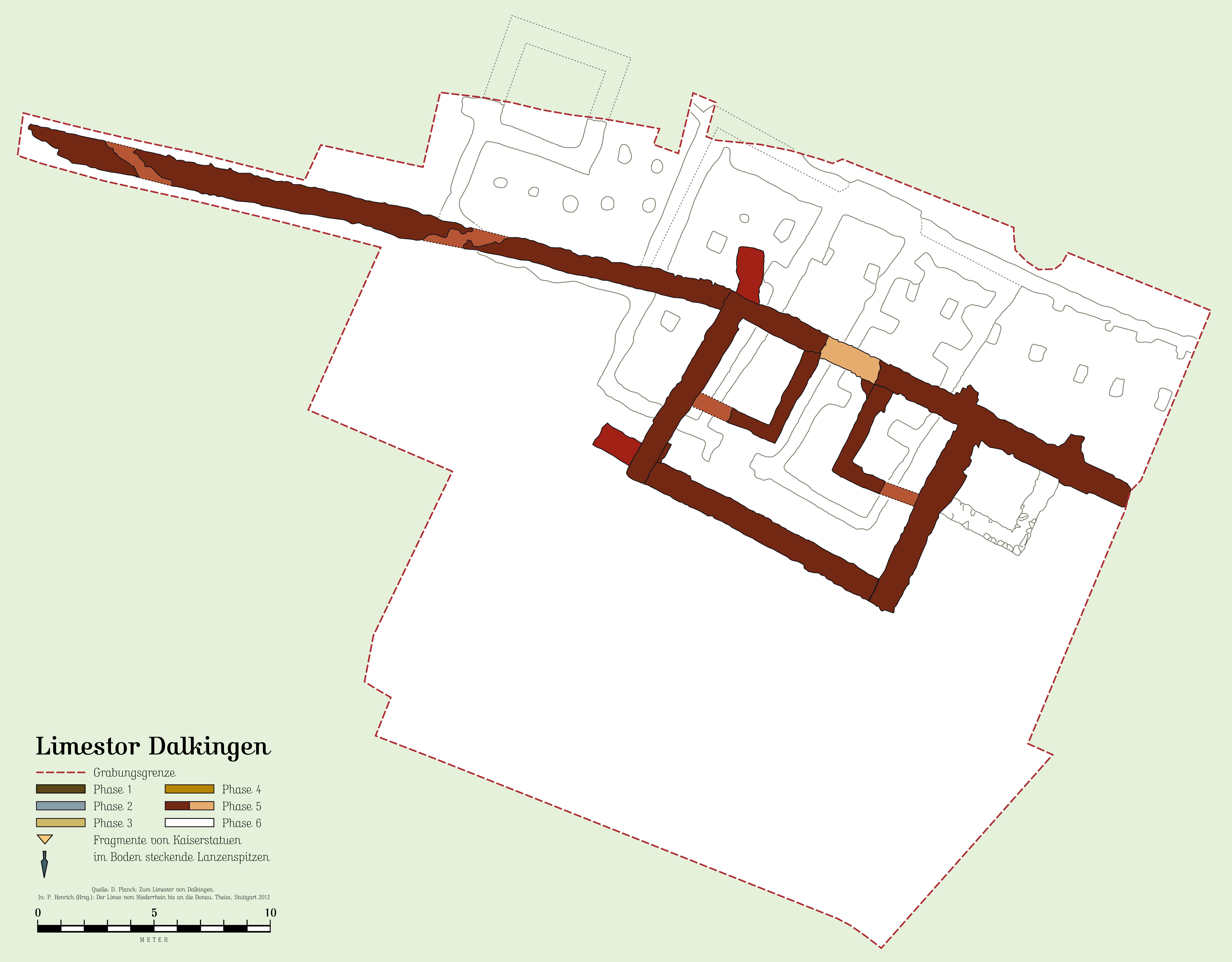
Phase 5

=== Phase 5 ===
The Limes wall was built in stone during the reign of Emperor Septimius Severus (193-211). This is indicated, among other things, by dendrochronologically examined timbers from the substructure of the wall at Fort Dambach, which were felled in the winter of 206/207 CE. Both the wooden passage and the tower from phase 4 were demolished down to the foundations for the construction of the wall. The Limes wall coming from the south-east now ran directly across its northern flank before it cut the dismantled wooden gateway in the middle and bent to the west just within a few metres of it. At the same time, a 12.6 × 9.3 metre stone building was erected above the wooden structure, shifted slightly to the south-east, which took over the gate function of the previous building and connected directly to the Rhaetian Wall with its northern front. In the centre of this front, the researchers were able to make out the imprint of a massive swelling stone on the ground in the direction of the Limes wall, which illustrates its function as a passageway. A new tower could have been erected in the vicinity of the passageway to replace the demolished tower with the stone foundation, although its location is still unknown.

=== Phase 6 ===
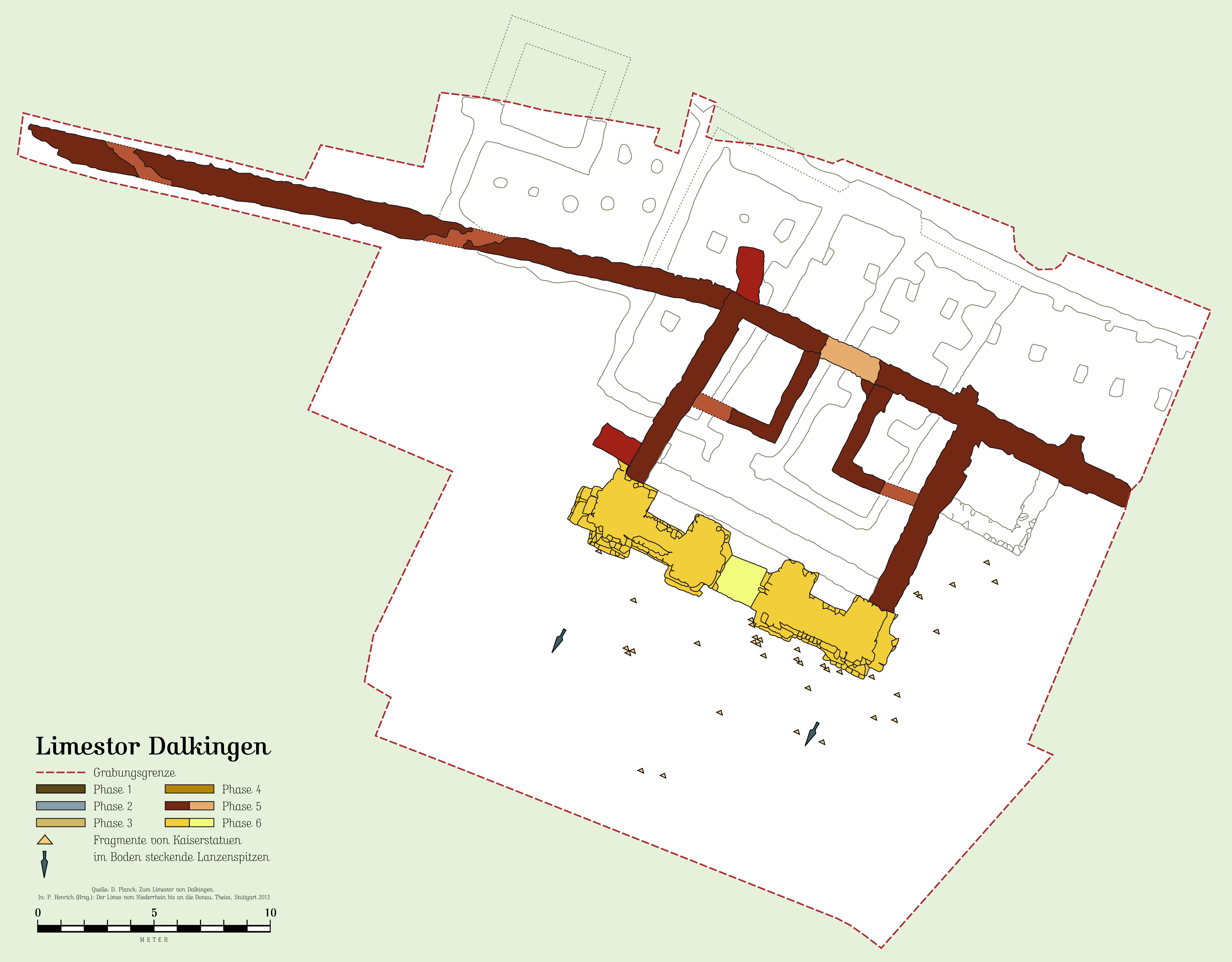
Phase 6

The southern wall of the Limes passage was probably completely demolished in 213 CE in connection with Caracalla's Germanic campaign. It was replaced by a richly structured, completely symmetrical façade up to 3.4 metres wide, which had a much deeper foundation than the other parts of the building. Therefore, it must have reached a significantly greater height above ground and thus towered over all the other buildings. The eastern and western surfaces of the façade were faced with lime tuff. The south side of the carefully crafted façade has two projecting rectangular pilasters on each side of the single-lane, approximately 2.1 metres wide passageway, between which elaborate mesh masonry (opus reticulatum) made of lime sintered stone was inserted in a recessed frame. The triumphal arch-like character of the layered masonry in front is clearly emphasised by these details. The special nature of the complex is also emphasised by many striking small finds. Particularly noteworthy are over 140 bronze fragments of a larger-than-life armoured statue of outstanding quality, most of which were picked up on the display side in front of the south-west front of the former archway. The largest preserved parts are several pteryges (textile or leather strips) of a breastplate and a sword pommel decorated with an eagle's head. The size and costliness of the statue as well as the iconographic details indicate that it was an imperial statue. A stylistic analysis of all the fragments led to the conclusion that the statue was older than the Limestor itself and was created in the late reign of Emperor Hadrian (117-138) or the first years of his successor Antoninus Pius (138-161). It was therefore reused for the new installation in Dalkingen. The head may have been replaced so that the artwork depicted a different emperor than originally, which was by no means unusual in antiquity.

Planck saw the Limes Gate as a possible crossing point for the Roman army during the Germanic campaign of 213 AD. This could be supported by the fact that the most important fort on the Rhaetian Limes, the cavalry fort of Aalen with its 1000-strong garrison, was located just a few kilometres southwest of the Limes Gate and that there was a direct road connection from this garrison to the Limes Gate. Possible opponents of Rome in this context could have been the Alamanni. The archaeologist Dietwulf Baatz (1928-2021) first raised objections to Planck's interpretation of construction phase 6 as a pompous Limes gate in 1993. He interpreted the reconstruction as a sanctuary built against the Limes wall with a roofed cella. However, as Baatz was unable to provide any evidence-based reasons for his speculation, he remained alone with this view.

== Buildings in the surroundings ==
=== Limestone kiln ===
In order to connect the sewage pipe from Dalkingen to the Schwabsberg sewage treatment plant, a canal trench was dug around 100 metres south of the Limestor in 1978. During this work, the excavator cut into a kiln and several pits. The investigation of the site was carried out by the Department for the Preservation of Archaeological Monuments of the Baden-Württemberg State Monuments Office under the direction of Dieter Planck from 16 June 1978 to 26 June 1978. The excavators discovered a round limestone kiln with a diameter of around 4.20 metres. The hemispherical kiln pit had been sunk around 1.30 metres deep into the lime marl. At its bottom was an almost rectangular shaft, another 0.70 metres deep. The excavators were able to observe air supply channels at the bottom of which charcoal had been retained and which led to the pit. The southern part of the pit was bordered by a mortarless wall made of quarry stones, in which there were slits for the air supply channels. Although no finds were made in the entire kiln area, the excavators surmised that the lime kiln had been built for the construction of the Raetian Wall or the Limes Gate and was therefore probably Roman.

=== Possible small fort ===
Geophysical investigations carried out in 2012 and 2014 revealed another feature around 50 metres southeast of the Limestor. This was a previously unearthed square stone building measuring 20 × 20 metres, which archaeologist Stephan Bender (1965-2019) classified as a sanctuary or, more likely, a small Roman fort. The small building is aligned almost exactly with the course of the Limes with its northeastern flank.

== Decline ==
As the findings at the gatehouse, which was most likely also inhabited by the guard, show, the complex burnt down and was not rebuilt afterwards. In the past, the end of Dalkingen was associated with the Alamanni invasions in 233/234 CE. A denarius minted between 231 and 235 CE from the reign of Emperor Severus Alexander (222 to 235 CE) is considered to be the last coin at the Limes Gate. However, as there is no evidence of an Alamanni attack between 233 and 234 in the nearby vicus of Buch fort, the Germanic raid could have taken place in the early summer of 254 CE. At that time, the village of Buch perished in a catastrophic fire. The extent to which the Rhaetian border in the Dalkingen area remained intact until the final fall of the Limes in 259/260 is still unknown today.

== Further findings ==
=== Militaria ===
In addition to the fragments of the bronze statue, eight bronze fibulae in bow, swastika, ribbon and S shapes from the late 2nd and early 3rd century were recovered. Also, worth mentioning, is the fragment of a masked helmet, a typical item of equipment for cavalry troops. The fragments of horse harness made of bronze, partially tinned fibulae and decorative buttons that were also found match this. The surviving offensive weapons include seven spearheads. Four of them could be connected to a ritual marking out of the building site. They were found rammed into the undisturbed ground, two in front of the south-west front to the left and right of the access road to the Limes gate and one each on the east and west sides of the Limes passageway. Other military artefacts found in the ground included a fragment of a dagger sheath and a bronze chape. The decoration of this chape with heart-shaped cut-outs was typical of Roman military equipment from the end of the 2nd century, when the spatha had become the main weapon in close combat. The presence of long-range weapons at the limestone gate is illustrated by projectile bolts fired from rapid-firing torsion launchers.

=== Building tools, other iron finds and bones ===
Other artefacts include various tools. These include a hammer, an iron awl, a spoon drill, a scraper for woodworking, an axe, fragments of at least two cast iron spoons and a cast iron ladle. Iron knives, keys and the remains of a pair of scissors were also discovered. Animal bones showed clear signs of having been chopped when the meat was cut up. Together with the militaria, these finds and features indicate that the Limes passage was continuously occupied by the Roman military.

=== Ceramics ===
Many pottery fragments were catalogued from the gate, although late terra sigillata from Rheinzabern (Tabernae) and pots with heart- and sickle-shaped profiles are completely absent.

=== Coins ===
During the excavations from 1973 to 1974 and the subsequent excavations on the occasion of the construction of the protective structure in 2009, 15 coins were recovered, which are now kept in the Württemberg State Museum and the Limes Museum in Aalen. The series begins with two coins of Hadrian, followed by two coins of Antoninus Pius.

Coinage	Nominal value	Date	Place of coinage	State of conservation
Hadrian	Dupondius	118–122 (?)	Rome	severely abraded
Hadrian	Dupondius	125–128	Rome	worn
Antoninus Pius	Sestertius	140–144	Rome	well-preserved
Antoninus Pius	As	145–161	Rome	well-preserved
Commemorative coin for Faustina I	Sestertius	140/141 –161	Rome	slightly corroded
Commemorative coin for Faustina I	As or Dupondius	140/141 –161	Rome	badly worn
Lucius Verus	Sestertius	163–164	Rome	badly worn
Lucilla	As	164–169	Rome	worn
Lucilla	Sestertius	164–169	Rome	worn
Commodus	Sestertius	184–185	Rome	worn
Commodus	Sestertius	186	Rome	worn
Septimius Severus	Denarius	200–201	Rome	very well-preserved
Elagabalus	Denarius	218–222	Rome	well-preserved
Severus Alexander	Denarius	227	Rome	very well-preserved
Severus Alexander	Denarius	227	Rome	very well-preserved
Severus Alexander	Denarius	231–235 (probably an antique forgery)	Rome	very well-preserved
Severus Alexander	Denarius	232	Rome	very well-preserved

== Historic preservation ==
As a section of the Upper German-Rhaetian Limes, the Dalkingen Limes Gate and the ground monuments mentioned here have been part of the UNESCO World Heritage Site since 2005. The sites are also cultural monuments under the Baden-Württemberg Monument Protection Act (DSchG). Investigations and the targeted collection of finds are subject to authorisation; accidental finds must be reported to the monument authorities.
