= Stephan Bender =

German archaeologist

Stephan Bender (born 30 December 1965, in Giessen – died 20 June 2019, in Heidelberg) was a German archaeologist specialised in provincial Roman archaeology.

== Education ==
After completing his secondary education, Stephan Bender served two years of military service as a temporary soldier before enrolling at the Goethe University Frankfurt in the winter semester of 1987/1988. He later continued his studies at the University of Freiburg, focusing on provincial Roman archaeology, with minors in classical archaeology and ancient history. In 1993, he completed his studies and began working on his doctoral dissertation in Frankfurt, on Bronze Bowls with Flat Horizontal Handles ("Casseroles") in the context of finds from Naples, Pompeii, and Herculaneum. The dissertation written at the Frankfurt Graduate School for "Archaeological Analytics" and led to his Doctorate in 2007.

== Career ==
From 2000, Bender worked for the Hesse State Office for Monument Preservation, cataloguing archaeological sites along the Roman Limes in Hesse as part of a joint application by the German states of Rhineland-Palatinate, Hesse, Baden-Württemberg, and Bavaria to have the Limes recognised as a UNESCO World Heritage Site. He played a key role in drafting the Limes Development Plan for Hesse, completed in 2005, the same year the Limes was designated as a World Heritage Site and Bender was appointed Hesse's first Limes Officer.

In 2007, Bender moved to Baden-Württemberg, where he established and led the Limes Information Centre at the Limes Museum Aalen. After 2013, he was employed by the Baden-Württemberg State Office for Monument Preservation. During this period, he also took on the coordination of the Limes Cicerones, a group of volunteer guides. Alongside these roles, Bender continued his research on the Limes, discovering the first evidence of wooden watchtowers in the western section of the Upper Germanic-Rhaetian Limes, a possible small fort at the Dalkingen Limes Gate, and an extension of the Neckar-Odenwald Limes into the Neckar foreland. In 2015, he became head of the newly created "World Heritage Archaeology" department at the Baden-Württemberg State Office for Monument Preservation.

Bender died in Heidelberg in 2019 after a serious illness. In May 2020, the provincial Roman archaeologist Andreas Schaflitzl succeeded him as Limes Coordinator in Baden-Württemberg.

== Publications ==
Listed in order of publication year:

- Bender, Stephan (2005). Der Justinusfelsen: Führungsblatt zu der römischen Felsinschrift und den Limesanlagen im Aartal bei Bad Schwalbach, Rheingau-Taunus-Kreis [The Justinus Rock: Guide to the Roman rock inscription and the Limes fortifications in the Aartal valley near Bad Schwalbach, Rheingau-Taunus district]. Archäologische Denkmäler in Hessen (in German). Vol. 165. Wiesbaden: Abteilung Archäologie und Paläontologie im Landesamt für Denkmalpflege Hessen. ISBN 978-3-89822-165-8.
- Bender, Stephan (2008). "Das Bodendenkmal – Umgang und Rezeption" [The archaeological monument – handling and reception]. In Thiel, Andreas; Deutsche Limeskommission (eds.). Der Limes als UNESCO-Welterbe [The Limes as a UNESCO World Heritage Site]. Beiträge zum Welterbe Limes (in German). Stuttgart: Theiss. ISBN 978-3-8062-2118-3.
- Bender, Stephan; Meyer, Marcus (2011). Unesco-Welterbe - Grenzen des Römischen Reiches - Obergermanisch Raetischer Limes in Baden-Württemberg [UNESCO World Heritage – Frontiers of the Roman Empire – Upper Germanic-Raetian Limes in Baden-Württemberg] (in German). Esslingen: Landesamt für Denkmalpflege.
- Baumgärtner, Manfred; Gatter, Tilman; Bender, Stephan, eds. (2013). Der Limes im Ostalbkreis [The Limes in the Ostalbkreis] (in German). Schwäbisch Gmünd: Einhorn-Verlag. ISBN 978-3-936373-92-9.
- Contributions to: Dieter Planck: Planck, Dieter (2014). Das Limestor bei Dalkingen: Gemeinde Rainau, Ostalbkreis [The Limestor at Dalkingen: Municipality of Rainau, Ostalbkreis] (in German). Darmstadt: Kommissionsverlag, Konrad Theiss Verlag. ISBN 978-3-8062-3033-8.
- Bender, Stephan (2015), Am Limes – aktiv. Erlebnis Limes, spüren, wie die Römer lebten [At the Limes – active. Experience the Limes, feel how the Romans lived] (PDF) (Brochure) (in German), Landratsamt Rems-Murr-Kreis, Landratsamt Ostalbkreis
- Bender, Stephan (2025). Bronzeschalen mit flachem horizontalem Griff ("Kasserollen"): archäologische und metrologische Studien an Funden aus den römischen Vesuvsiedlungen [Bronze bowls with flat horizontal handles (‘casseroles’): archaeological and metrological studies of finds from Roman settlements around Vesuvius] (in German). Mainz: LEIZA Verlag. ISBN 978-3-88467-366-9.
