= Dieter Planck =

German archaeologist

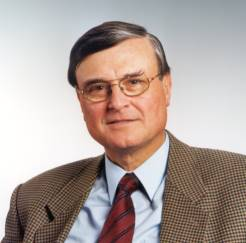
Dieter Planck (2003)

Dieter Planck (August 14, 1944 – July 1, 2025) was a German archaeologist specializing in Provincial Roman archaeology and heritage conservation. He served as president of the Baden-Württemberg State Office for Monument Preservation within the Stuttgart Regional Council and was the founding director of the Archaeological State Museum of Baden-Württemberg.

== Career ==
After graduating from Eugen-Bolz-Gymnasium in Rottenburg am Neckar, Planck studied Prehistory and Early History, Ancient History, Prehistoric Archaeology, and Classical Archaeology at the University of Tübingen and LMU Munich.

In 1970, Planck earned his PhD with a dissertation on Arae Flaviae at the University of Tübingen. He began working in archaeological heritage conservation in Tübingen, and from 1972, he served as a specialist for monument preservation in the North Württemberg Regional Council. From 1979 to 1994, he led archaeological heritage conservation in Baden-Württemberg, significantly expanding the preservation of archaeological monuments. Starting in 1983, funding for land acquisition enabled the creation of archaeological reserves, protecting significant ancient sites from modern destruction. However, a later administrative reform reversed these measures.

In 1992, Planck was appointed director of the newly established Archaeological State Museum of Baden-Württemberg. In 1993, he introduced the Day of Open Monuments in Baden-Württemberg. In 1994, he became president of the Baden-Württemberg State Office for Monument Preservation, serving until August 2009 as head of Department 8 – State Office for Monument Preservation within the Stuttgart Regional Council. He also taught as an honorary professor at the Historical Institute of the University of Stuttgart.

Planck retired in 2009, succeeded by Claus Wolf.

Planck died on July 1, 2025, in Stuttgart at the age of 80 and was buried on July 17, 2025, in an urn at the family grave in Sülchenfriedhof, Rottenburg am Neckar. An obituary by the Baden-Württemberg State Office for Monument Preservation praised his contributions, noting that he “sustainably shaped the concept of holistic monument preservation combining archaeology and architectural conservation.”

== Archaeological focus ==
In 1971, Planck worked at Köngen Fort and its associated civilian settlement. His efforts to preserve the only fort along the Neckar-Odenwald Limes saved from modern development led to its designation as a cultural monument in 1974. He also supported the development of the Roman Park and Museum in Köngen. In 1973 and 1974, under Planck’s leadership, the Baden-Württemberg State Office for Monument Preservation excavated the Dalkingen Limes Gate at the Upper Germanic-Rhaetian Limes. The site was opened to the public in 1975. These excavations provided new insights into Roman frontier research. The Dalkingen Limes Gate became a UNESCO World Heritage Site in 2005 and was declared a cultural monument in 2006. From 1976 to 1981, Planck worked at the East Fort in Welzheim, focusing on the defensive walls to preserve the fort’s interior as an archaeological reserve. Notable finds were recovered from ancient wells, and with Dietwulf Baatz, he contributed to the reconstruction of the fort’s west gate, opened to the public in 1983. From 1979 to 1989, he led excavations and conservation of the headquarters building at the Limes Museum Aalen.

== Memberships ==
Since 1964, Planck was a member of the student fraternity Akademische Gesellschaft Stuttgardia Tübingen. He chaired the Association of State Archaeologists in Germany from 1988 to 2003. He was a corresponding member (1975) and full member (1981) of the German Archaeological Institute and a member of the Roman-Germanic Commission since 1980. Planck was a founding member of the German Limes Commission and its chairman from 2003 to 2009. He served as chairman of the Society for Archaeology in Württemberg and Hohenzollern from 1988 to 2014, becoming its honorary chairman until his death in 2025. Until his retirement in 2009, he chaired the jury of the Baden-Württemberg Archaeology Prize. Planck was a long-term member of the advisory board of the journal Archäologie in Deutschland and the board of the Wissenschaftliche Buchgesellschaft, serving as its interim chairman in 2012 after the death of Gert Haller. In 2010, he initiated the Baden-Württemberg Archaeology Foundation and chaired it until November 2022. He was also an honorary member of the board of trustees of the Baden-Württemberg Monument Foundation.

== Awards ==
- 2006: Daniel-Pfisterer Prize from the Köngen History and Culture Association for his contributions to the city’s Roman heritage
- 2010: Great Silver Plaque of Honor from the city of Aalen during the opening of a special exhibition at the Limes Museum Aalen
- 2013: Appointment as Commander of the Order of St. Sylvester
- 2014: Order of Merit of Baden-Württemberg
- 2014: Honorary Chairman of the Society for Archaeology in Württemberg and Hohenzollern
- 2023: Silver Medal of Honor from the Society for Archaeology in Württemberg and Hohenzollern

== Selected publications ==
- Editor of numerous works on Baden-Württemberg archaeology
- Das Rottweiler Römerbad (= Kleine Schriften des Stadtarchivs Rottweil. Volume 2). Stadtarchiv Rottweil, Rottweil, 1972.
- Neue Ausgrabungen am Limes (= Kleine Schriften zur Kenntnis der römischen Besetzungsgeschichte Südwestdeutschlands. Number 12). Society for Prehistory and Early History in Württemberg and Hohenzollern/Landesmuseum, Stuttgart, 1975.
- Arae Flaviae 1: Neue Untersuchungen zur Geschichte des römischen Rottweil (= Forschungen und Berichte zur Vor- und Frühgeschichte in Baden-Württemberg. Volume 6). 2 parts, Müller und Gräff, Stuttgart, 1975, ISBN 3-87532-061-1 and ISBN 3-87532-062-X.
- with Willi Beck: Der Limes in Südwestdeutschland. Limeswanderung Mainz – Rems – Wörnitz. Konrad Theiss Verlag, Stuttgart, 1980, ISBN 3-8062-0242-7. 2nd revised edition, 1987, ISBN 3-8062-0496-9.
- with Udelgard Körber-Grohne, Mostefa Kokabi, and Ulrike Piening: Flora und Fauna im Ostkastell von Welzheim (= Forschungen und Berichte zur Vor- und Frühgeschichte in Baden-Württemberg. Volume 14). Konrad Theiss Verlag, Stuttgart, 1983.
- Das Freilichtmuseum am Rätischen Limes im Ostalbkreis (= Führer zu archäologischen Denkmälern in Baden-Württemberg. Volume 9). Konrad Theiss Verlag, Stuttgart, 1983, ISBN 3-8062-0223-0.
- Editor: Der Keltenfürst von Hochdorf. Methoden und Ergebnisse der Landesarchäologie. Theiss, Stuttgart, 1985, ISBN 3-8062-0441-1.
- Editor: Archäologie in Württemberg. Ergebnisse und Perspektiven archäologischen Forschung von der Altsteinzeit bis zur Neuzeit. Theiss, Stuttgart, 1988, ISBN 3-8062-0542-6.
- Das römische Walheim. Ausgrabungen 1980–1988 (= Archäologische Informationen aus Baden-Württemberg. Issue 18). Society for Prehistory and Early History in Württemberg and Hohenzollern, Stuttgart, 1991, ISBN 3-927714-10-0.
- Editor: Archäologie in Baden-Württemberg. Das Archäologische Landesmuseum, Außenstelle Konstanz. Theiss, Stuttgart, 1994, ISBN 3-8062-1168-X.
- with Otto Braasch, Judith Oexle, Helmut Schlichtherle: Unterirdisches Baden-Württemberg. 250.000 Jahre Geschichte und Archäologie im Luftbild. Konrad Theiss Verlag, Stuttgart, 1994, ISBN 3-8062-0497-7.
- Editor: Die Römer in Baden-Württemberg: Römerstätten und Museen von Aalen bis Zwiefalten. Theiss, Stuttgart, 2005, ISBN 3-8062-1555-3.
- with Andreas Thiel: Das Limes-Lexikon. Roms Grenzen von A bis Z. Beck, Munich, 2009, ISBN 978-3-406-56816-9.
- Das Limestor bei Dalkingen (= Forschungen und Berichte zur Vor- und Frühgeschichte in Baden-Württemberg. Volume 129). Theiss, Darmstadt, 2014, ISBN 978-3-8062-3033-8.

== Bibliography ==
- Jörg Biel, Jörg Heiligmann, Dirk Krausse (eds.): Landesarchäologie. Festschrift für Dieter Planck (= Forschungen und Berichte zur Vor- und Frühgeschichte in Baden-Württemberg. Volume 100). Theiss, Stuttgart, 2009, ISBN 978-3-8062-2331-6 (Commemorative publication with biographical tribute on pp. 17–19 and bibliography on pp. 25–37).
