= Archaeological State Museum of Baden-Württemberg =

Coordinates: 47.6678°N 9.1791°E

- Archäologisches Landesmuseum Baden-Württemberg
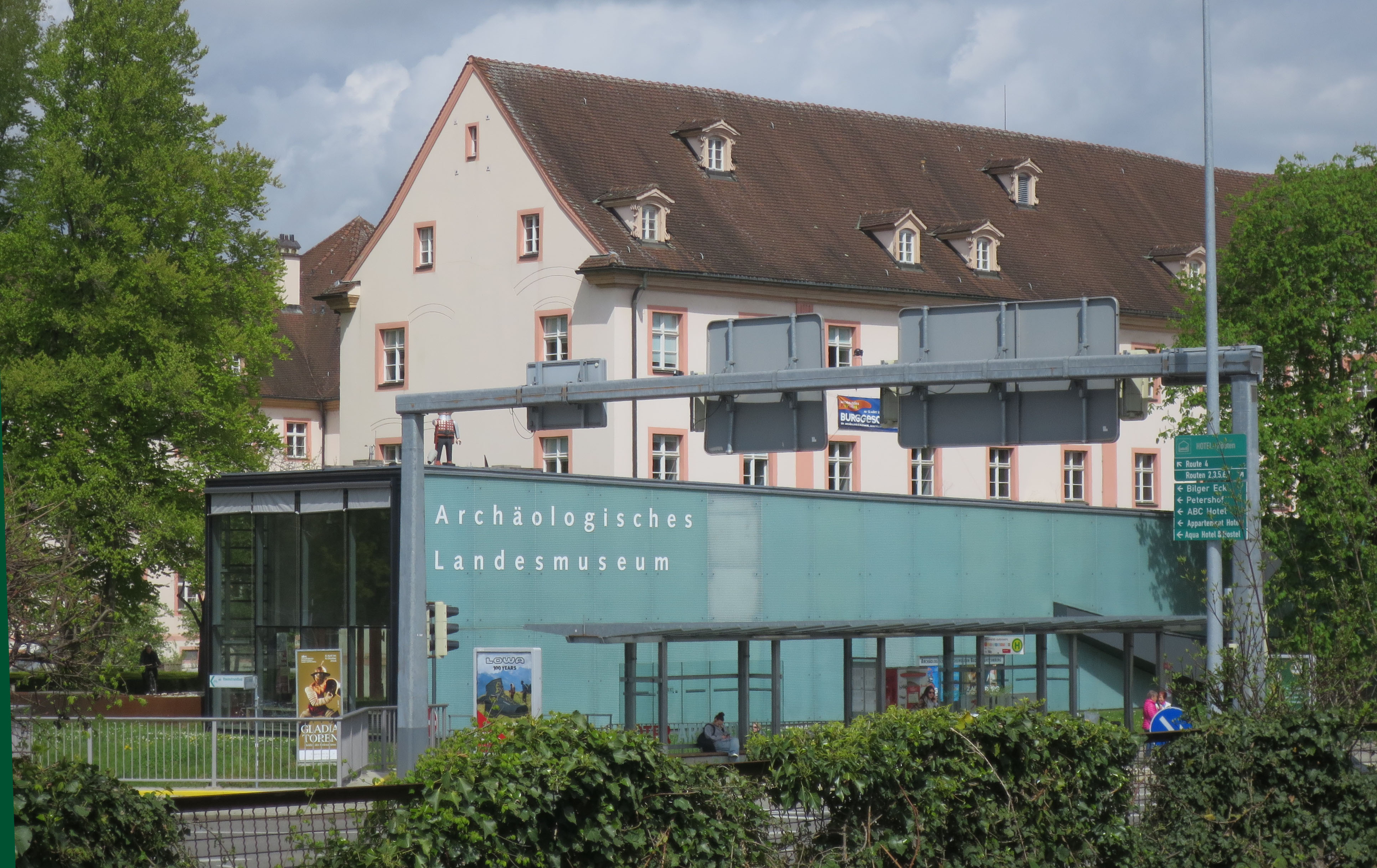
- Former Petershausen Abbey, now home of the Archaeological State Museum
- Established: 1990, opened in 1992
- Location: Konstanz, Germany
- Type: Museum of archaeology and regional history
- Executive director: Claus Wolf
- Owner: State of Baden-Württemberg
- Website: www.konstanz.alm-bw.de

The Archaeological State Museum of Baden-Württemberg (ALM) in Konstanz is responsible for preserving, researching. and presenting archaeological finds from throughout the federal state. Together with the House of History Baden-Württemberg in Stuttgart, it is one of only two museums whose purview extends over the entire state of Baden-Württemberg. The exhibition space — including that of its branch museums — is 8,717 m^{2} (93,830 sq ft).

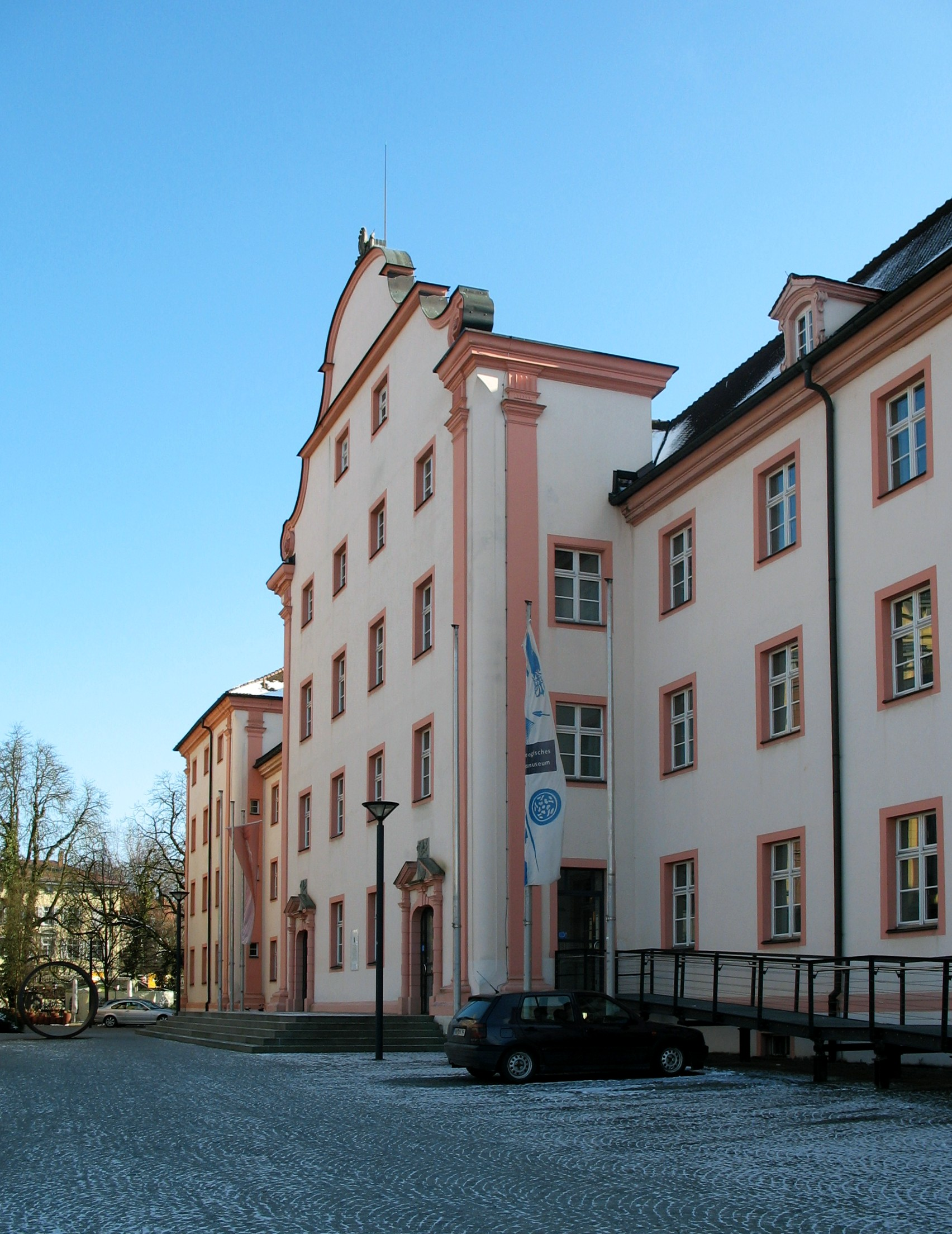
Main entrance

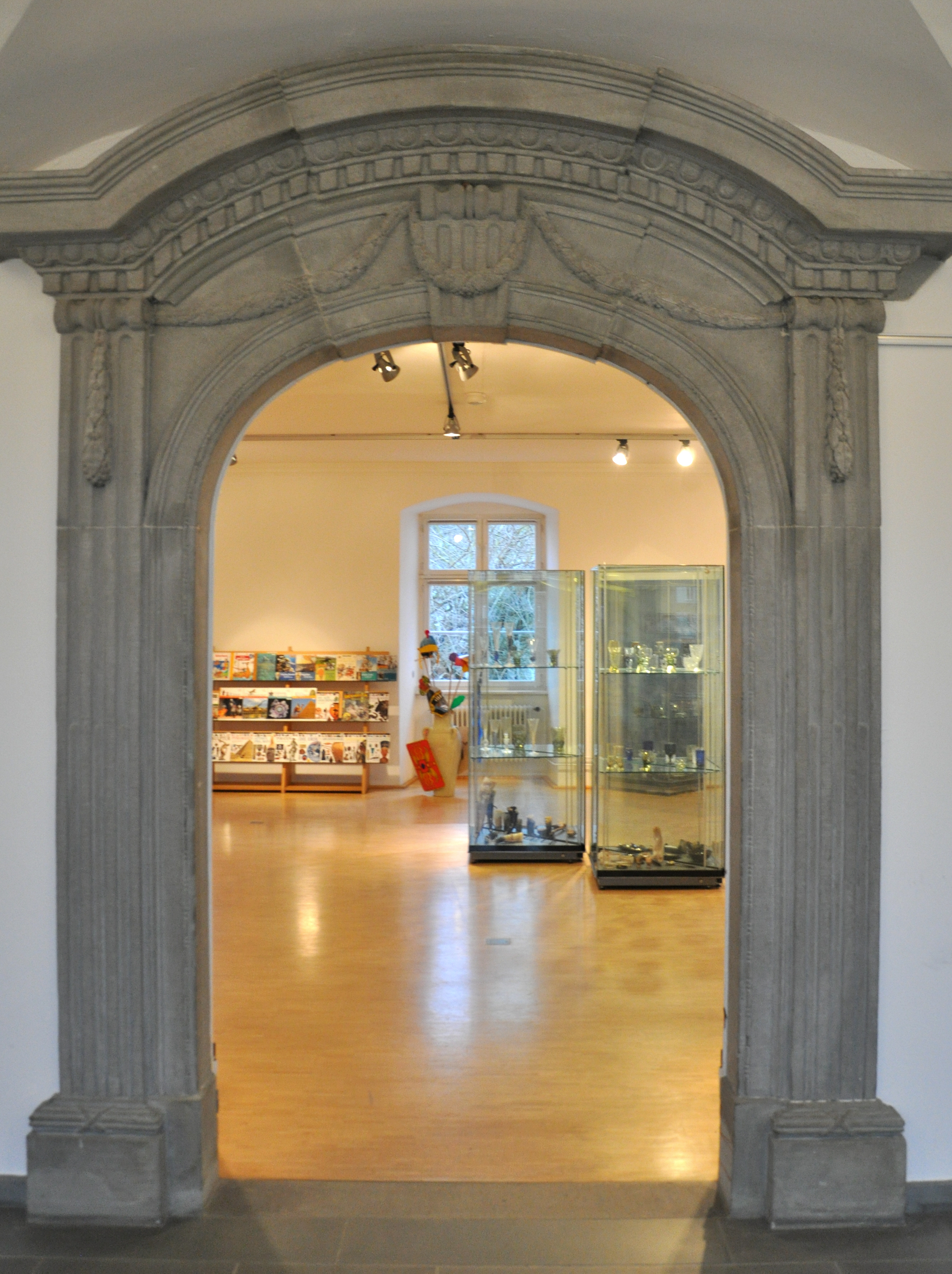
Museum shop

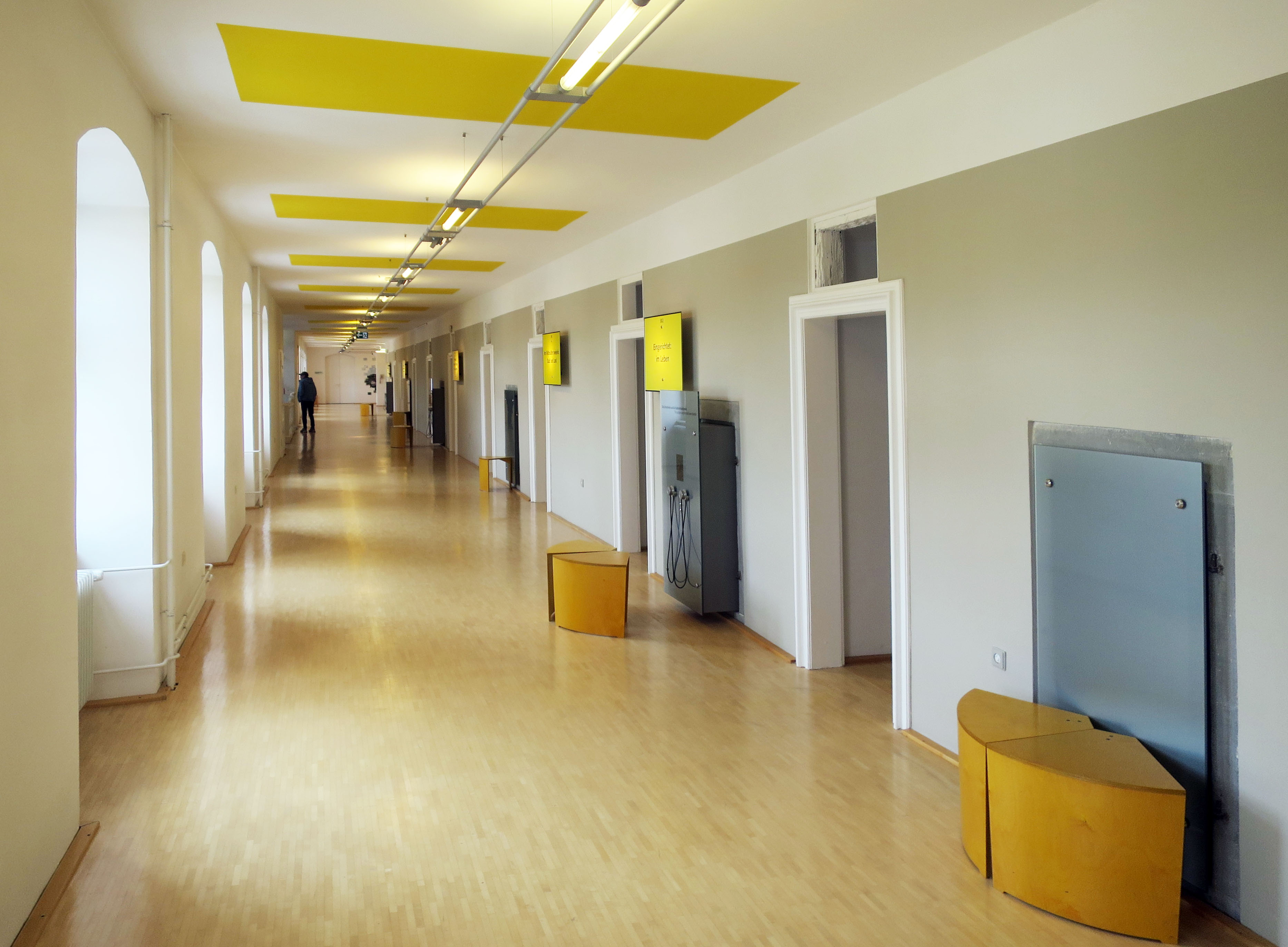
Museum hallway connecting the former Abbey's monastic cells

== Organisation ==
On 8 June 1990, the state government under Lothar Späth decided to establish a State Museum of Archaeology. The founding director was Dieter Planck, the state archaeologist and president of the State Office for Monument Preservation of Baden-Württemberg. Since suitable space for the state museum could not be found in Stuttgart and the state-owned Petershausen Abbey was vacant, it was decided to establish a branch museum in Konstanz that could later be transferred to a still to be built building in the capital city of Stuttgart. This plan was given up in 2012 and the ALM became an independent, state-run museum that today (2025) is responsible for eight affiliated branches.

The ALM has had six directors since 1990. The scientific head of the museum is also the president of the State Agency for Monument Preservation in Stuttgart. Daily operations are overseen by the "permanent representative of the director" (Ständige Vertretung der Wissenschaftlichen Direktion) at the museum offices in Konstanz. In Januar 2023 archaeologist Nina Willburger succeeded Barbara Theune-Großkopf in this position.

== Building and exhibition areas ==
The main exhibit area is located in the convent building of the former Petershausen Abbey of the Benedictines in Konstanz on the southern shore of Lake Constance. The ALM oversees additional collections and exhibition sites throughout the state.

The Abbey's Baroque style building consisted of rows of Monastic cells arranged along long corridors. This historical architecture has been largely preserved, although the walls of some cells have been removed to facilitate larger display areas as needed. The permanent displays of the museum were opened to the public on 14 March 1992.

An annex to the museum was opened on 18 September 2000 to house a 14-meter-long and 5-meter-wide barge that had been used to transport cargo in the 14th century. It had been discovered only ten years earlier.

The ALM houses extensive permanent exhibitions which include a selection of archaeological finds that represent a cross-section of the history of the region within the boundaries of Baden-Württemberg, ranging from the Paleolithic to the Early modern period. These exhibitions are displayed over three floors in a space of 3,000 m^{2} (32,000 sq ft).

The following gives a selection of the topics on permanent display:

=== Ground floor ===
- Prehistoric Stilt houses in Alpine regions
- Model of an excavation site: Exploring the methods archaeologists employ to make their discoveries
- Dugout canoe, cargo vessel, steamship: the history of waterborne travel in southwest Germany
- The oldest excavated boat of Lake Constance, a medieval cargo barge discovered off-shore near Immenstaad .

=== First floor ===
- Stilt houses around Lake Constance and in Upper Swabia
- Ladenburg: archaeological finds among the remains of a Roman settlement with the Latin name Lopodunum

=== Second floor ===
- Remains of a Roman settlement at Trossingen
- Living conditions in the cities and villages of the Middle Ages
- Recent archaeological finds within the city of Konstanz, including an interactive display of the city's development since the first Roman fortifications (Kastell) on the site of present-day city
- "Learning from Toilets": What the excavations of sewage and latrines reveals about our history

=== Unique specimens ===
- The Trossinger Leier, a lyre found in an Alemanni gravesite near Trossingen, dating to 580 CE. The lyre is nearly perfectly preserved, one of only 15 known early medieval specimens.
- The Menhir von Weilheim a massive stone from the early Bronze Age
- The oldest ship to be excavated from Lake Constance, dating to 1340 CE, that was once used to transport cargo

=== Archaeology and playmobil ===
Since 2006 the ALM has staged special exhibitions with a variety of themes using Playmobil figures to re-enact historical epochs in a 100 m^{2} (1,100 sq ft) exhibition area on the top floor of the museum.

== External sites, branch museums ==
The Archaeological State Museum of Baden-Württemberg is responsible for the following external sites:

- Federsee Museum in Bad Buchau (with an information center for the Prehistoric pile dwellings around the Alps, a World Heritage Site)
- Prehistoric Museum (Urgeschichtliches Museum) at Blaubeuren (with an information center for the Caves and Ice Age Art in the Swabian Jura, a World Heritage Site)
- Five documentation centres for the World Heritage Site Upper Germanic-Rhaetian Limes:
  - Römerhaus in Walheim
  - Limesmuseum in Aalen
  - Römermuseum in Osterburken
  - Römerkeller in Oberriexingen
  - Roman section (Arae Flaviae) of the Dominikanermuseum in Rottweil
- Central archaeological depository (Zentrales Fundarchiv) in Rastatt. This site's mission is the storage, conservation and restoration of artefacts and it is not normally open to the public.

== Gallery ==
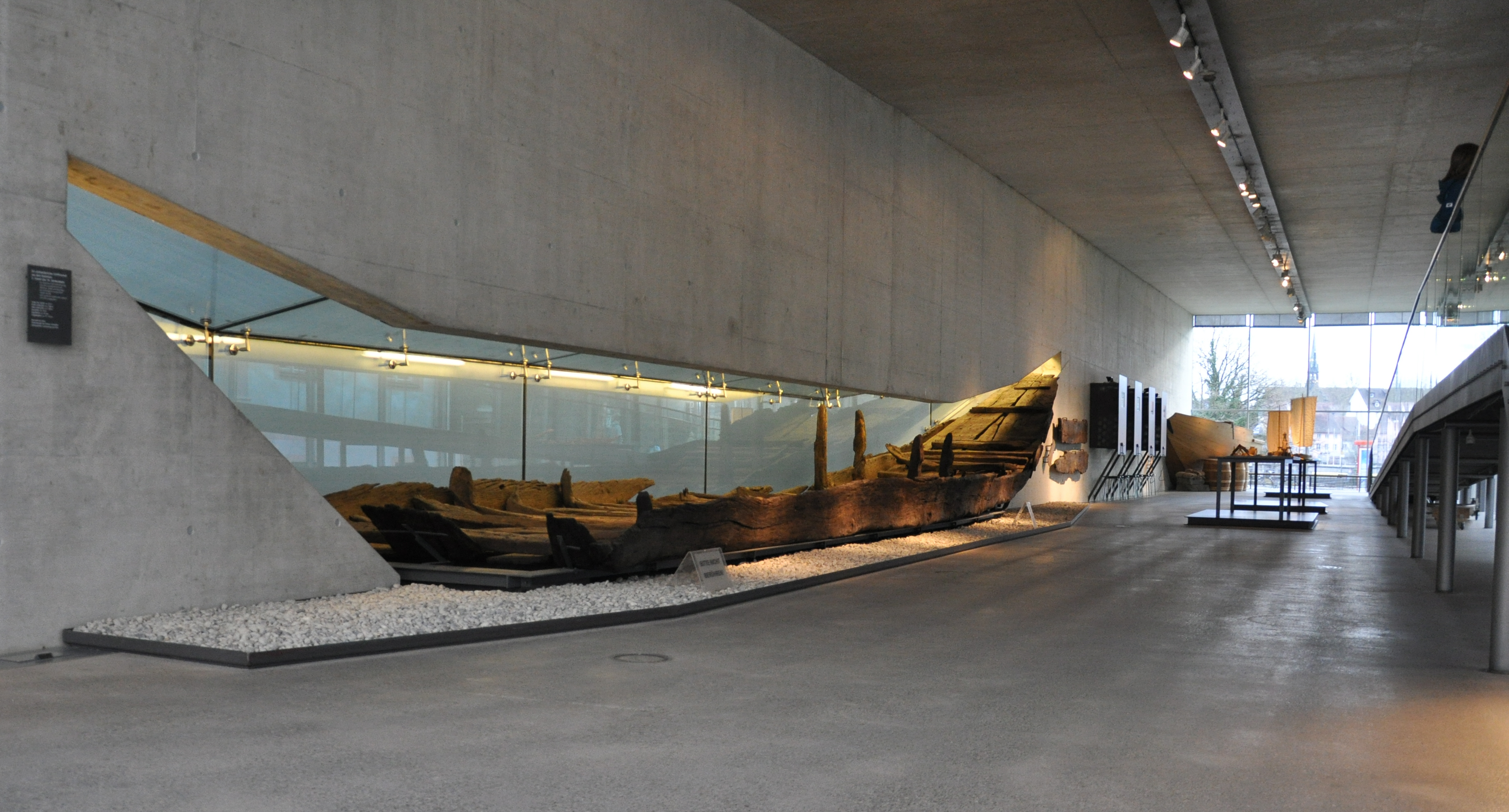
The annex is dedicated to the history of waterborne travel.

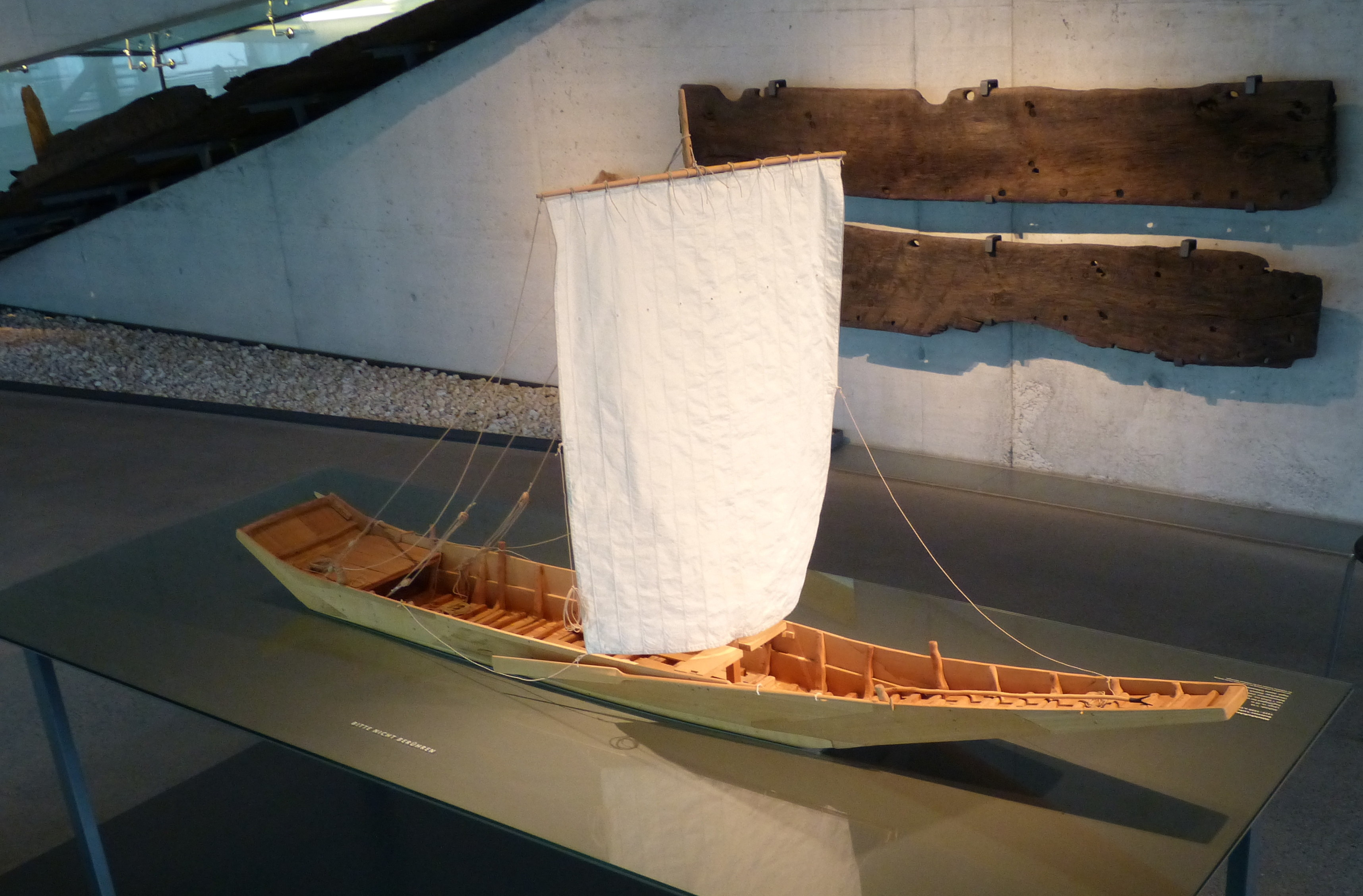
Model of a medieval cargo sailboat

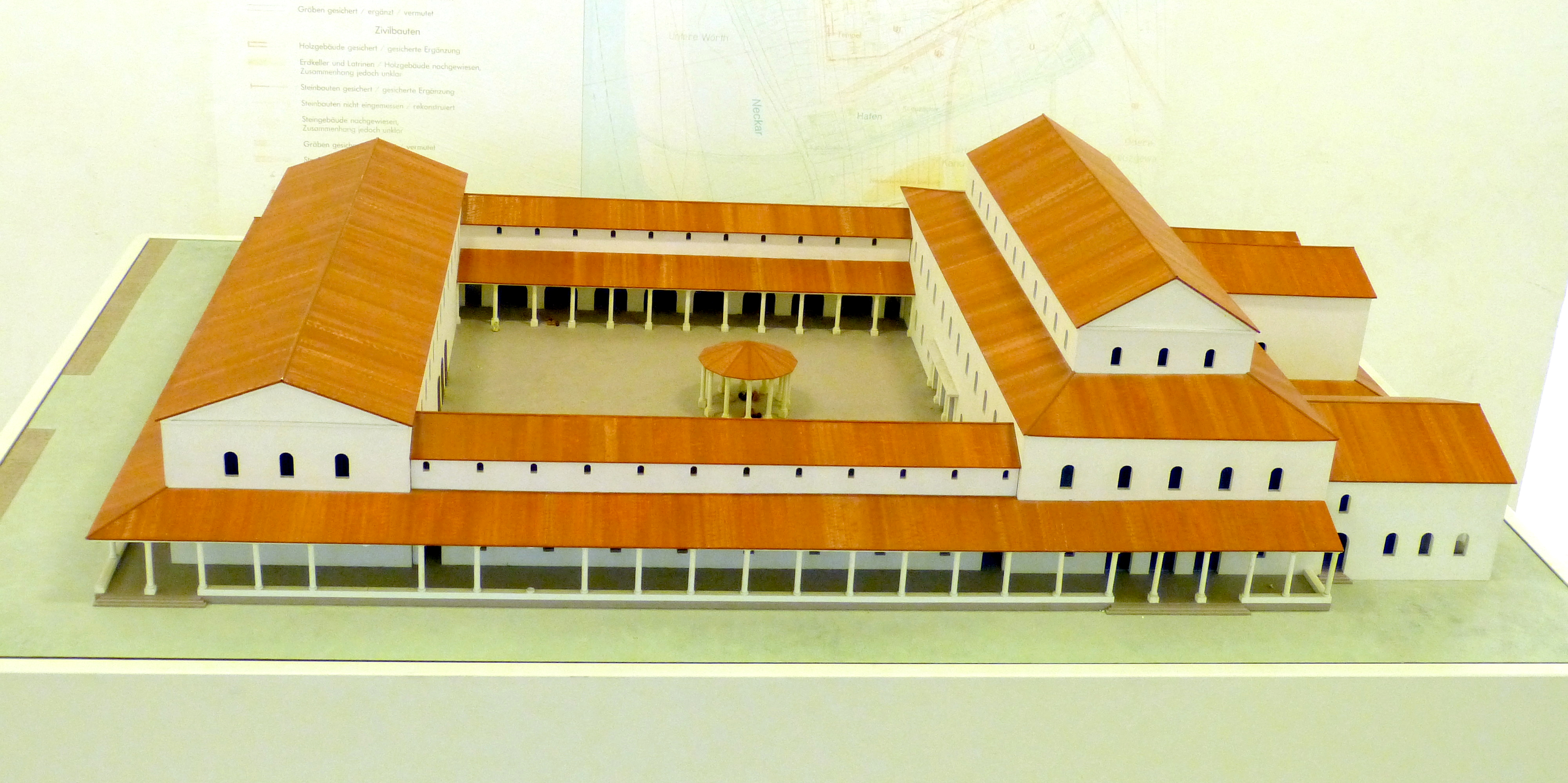
Model of Lopodunum Forum

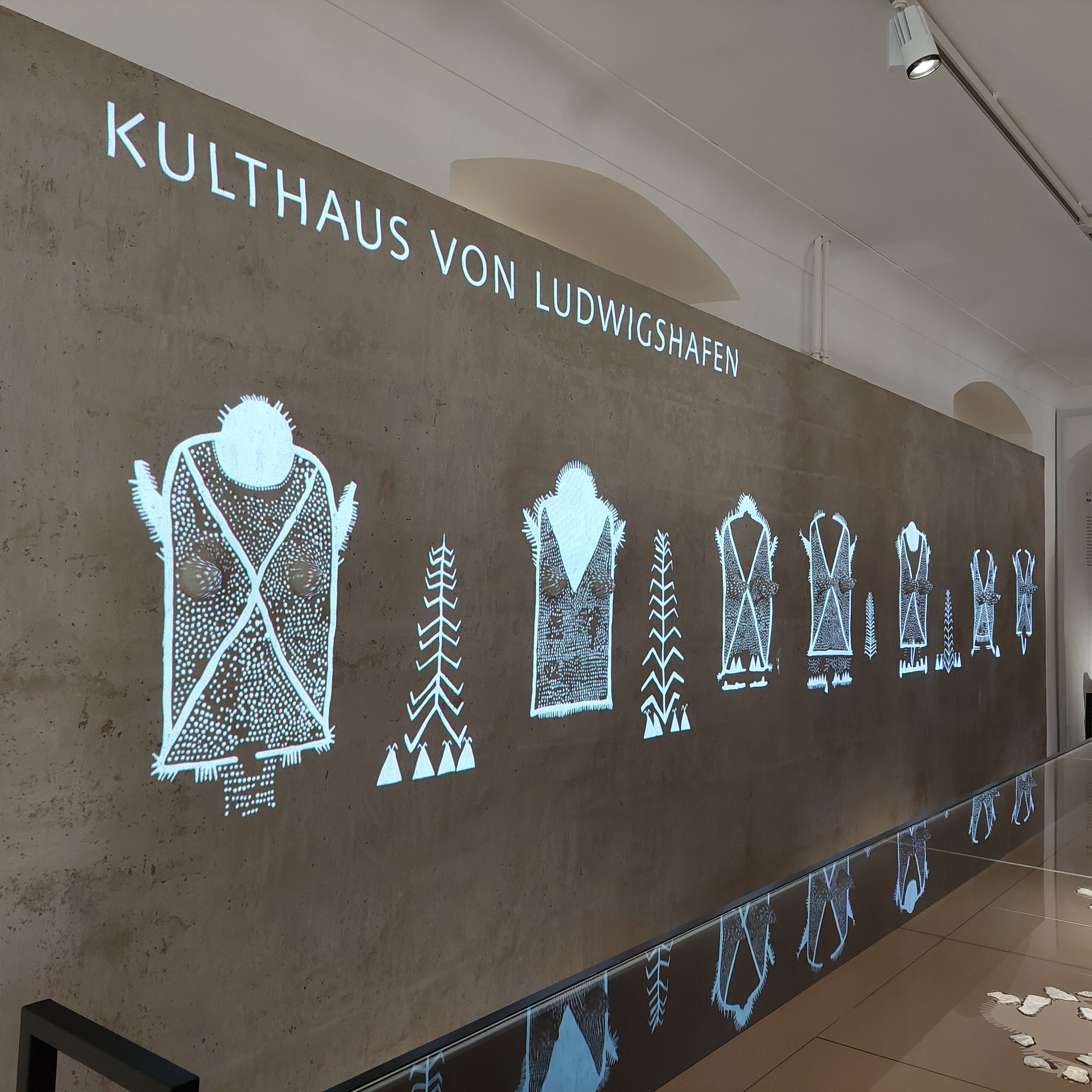
Interactive display

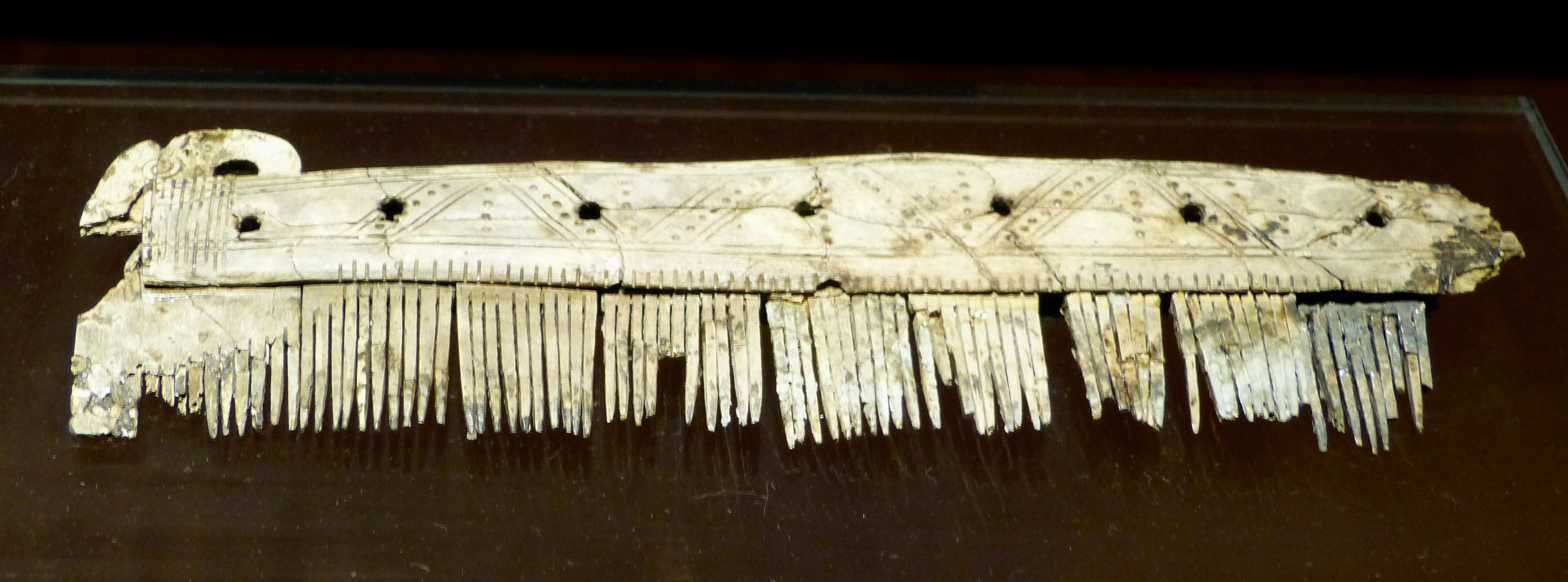
Comb made from deer antler

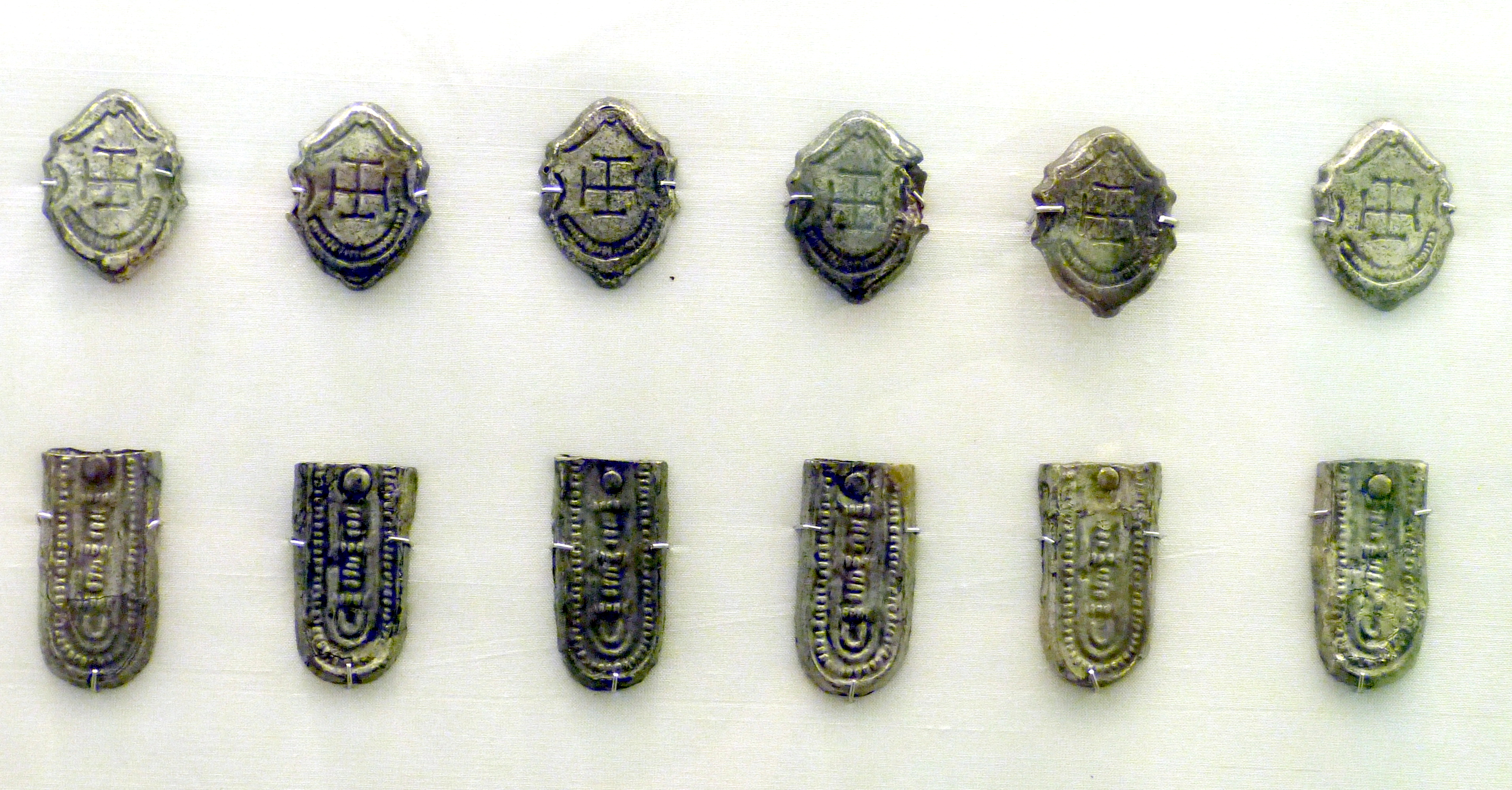
Belt fittings

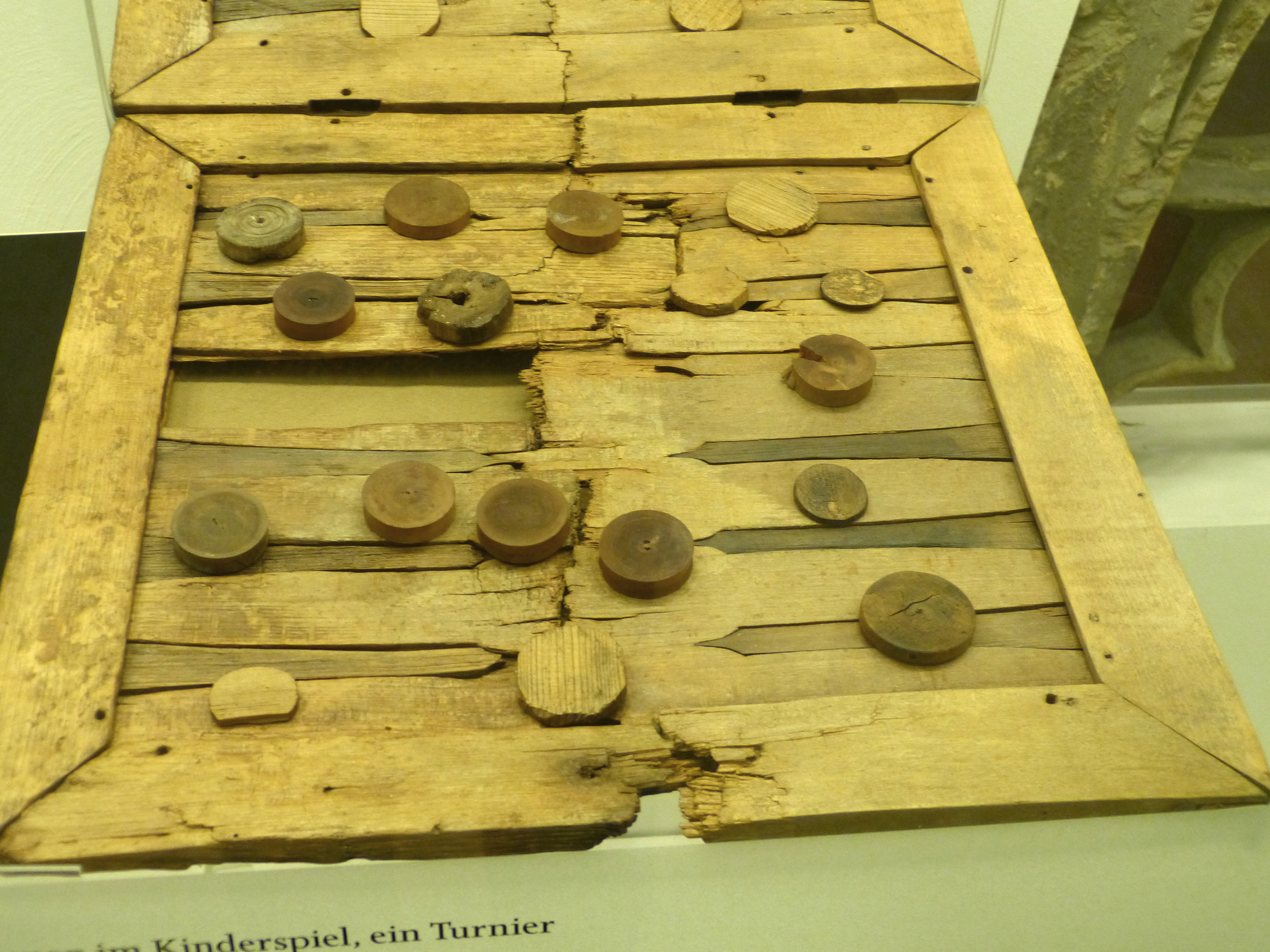
Medieval board game found in Konstanz

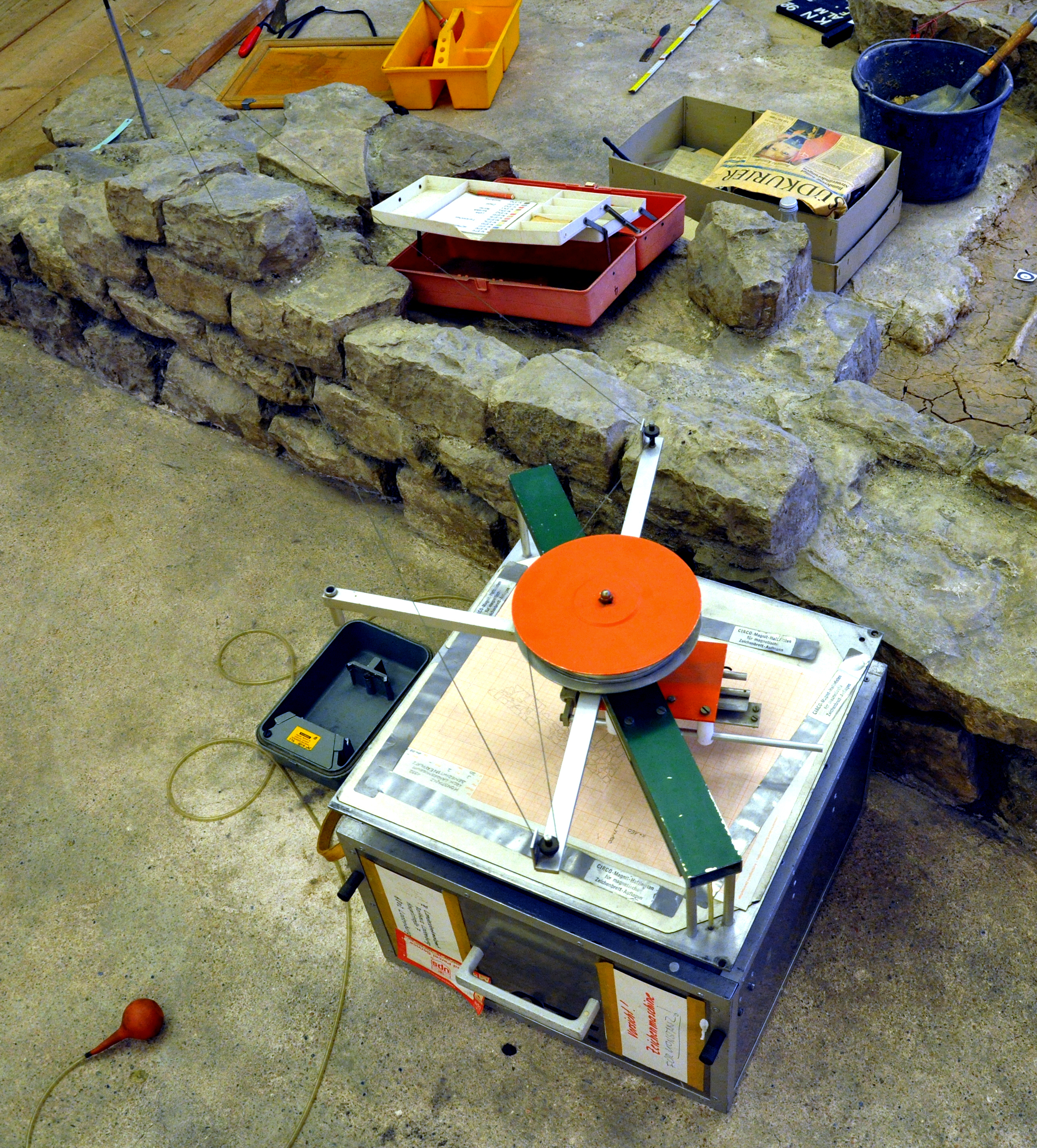
Part of the permanent exhibition describes the methods used in archaeological excavations.

== Bibliography ==
- Carol C. Mattusch: Broken but not forgotten: fragments of bronze statues from the northern limes. In: Journal of Roman Archaeology, Vol. 28, 2015, DOI: 10.1017/S1047759415003098
- Dieter Planck (ed.): Archäologie in Baden-Württemberg. Das Archäologische Landesmuseum, Außenstelle Konstanz. Theiss, Stuttgart 1994, ISBN 3-8062-1168-X
- Ralph Röber und Barbara Theune-Großkopf: Sonderausstellungen. Landesweit, regional, überregional, international. In: Archäologisches Landesmuseum Baden-Württemberg. 30 Jahre. Konstanz 2021, ISBN 978-3-00-072320-9, S. 52–69.
- Barbara Theune-Großkopf: Die Dauerausstellung. Das Herzstück jedes Museums. In: Archäologisches Landesmuseum Baden-Württemberg. 30 Jahre. Konstanz 2021, ISBN 978-3-00-072320-9, S. 42–51.
- Barbara Theune-Großkopf: Geschichte des ALM. Gründung und Entwicklung. In: Archäologisches Landesmuseum Baden-Württemberg. 30 Jahre. Konstanz 2021, ISBN 978-3-00-072320-9, S. 14–21.
- Claus Wolf: Archäologisches Landesmuseum Baden-Württemberg. Ein Museum für das ganze Land. In: Archäologisches Landesmuseum Baden-Württemberg. 30 Jahre. Konstanz 2021, ISBN 978-3-00-072320-9, S. 10–13.
- Publikationen des Archäologischen Landesmuseums Baden-Württemberg. In: Archäologisches Landesmuseum Baden-Württemberg. 30 Jahre. Konstanz 2021, ISBN 978-3-00-072320-9, S. 164–174.
