= Heinrich Jacobi =

Heinrich Jacobi may refer to:

- Friedrich Heinrich Jacobi (1743–1819), German philosopher
- Heinrich Jacoby (1889–1964), German musician and educator, who was an important influence to body psychotherapy
- Heinrich Jacobi (archaeologist) (1866–1946), German architect and archaeologist
