= Ernst von Herzog =

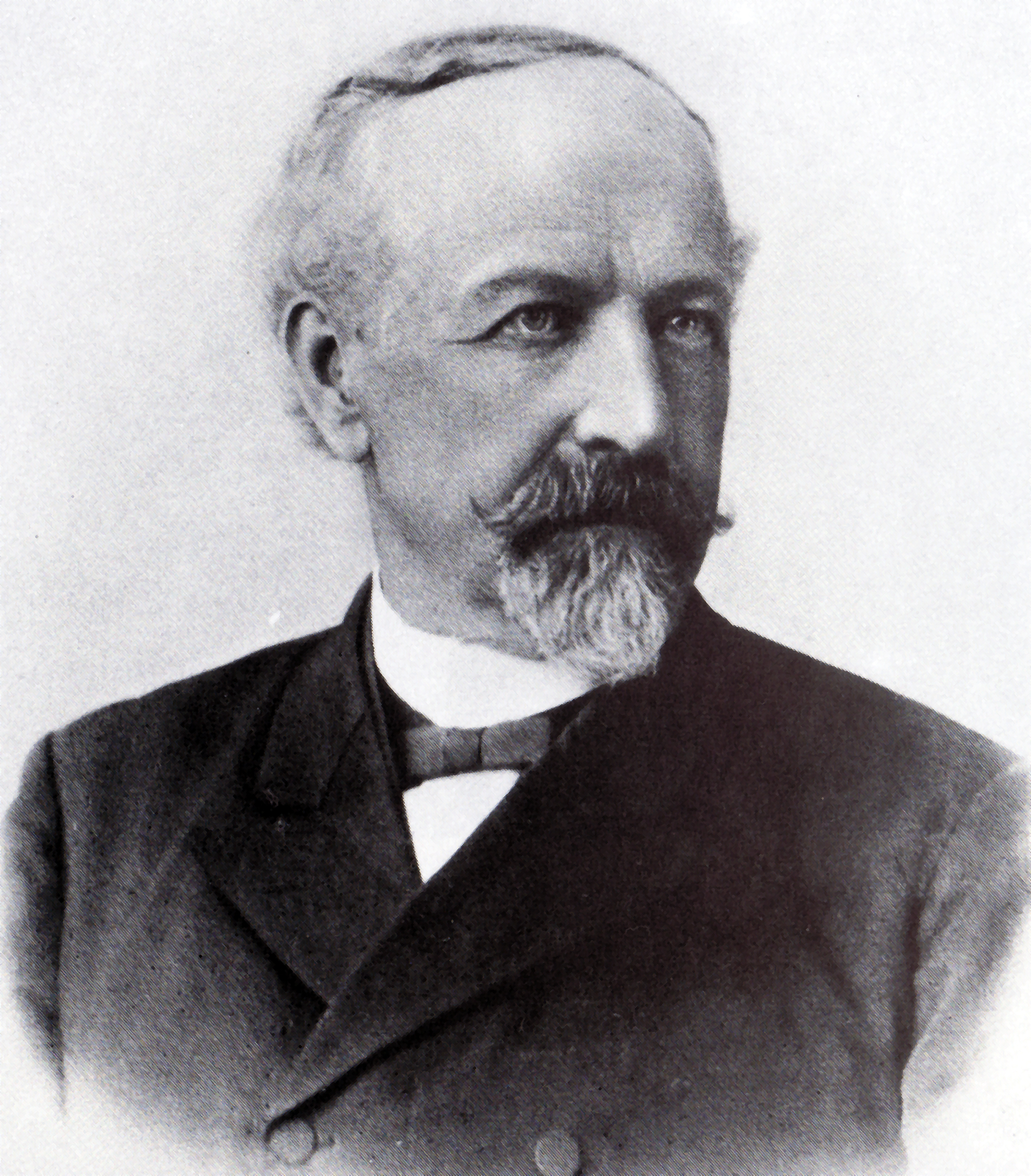
Ernst von Herzog, (ca. 1900)

Ernst von Herzog (23 November 1834, Esslingen am Neckar – 16 November 1911) was a German classical philologist and archaeologist, who was an expert in the field of Roman epigraphy.

He studied theology and classical philology at the University of Tübingen, and afterward continued his education at the Ludwig-Maximilians-Universität München. From 1857, he worked as a tutor in Paris, then studied archaeology at the Friedrich Wilhelm University of Berlin, followed by research at the German Archaeological Institute in Rome. In 1861, he conducted studies of ancient Roman inscriptions in southern France. In 1862, he obtained his habilitation for classical philology at Tübingen, where in 1867 he became an associate professor, followed by a full professorship in classical philology in 1874. Herzog was a prominent member of the Reichs-Limeskommission (German Limes Commission) and of the Römisch-Germanische Kommission des Deutschen Archäologischen Instituts (Roman-Germanic Commission of the German Archaeological Institute).

As a result of his scientific research in France, he published a book on the history of Gallia Narbonensis titled "Galliae narbonensi Commis provinciae Romanae historia descriptio institutorum expositio" (1864). In his studies associated with Limes Germanicus, he conducted archaeological excavations at several sites in Württemberg — Rottenburg am Neckar (1883–84), near Öhringen (1892), and Mainhardt and Jagsthausen (1893).

He was the author of a well-received work on the history and structure of the Roman Constitution, titled "Geschichte und system der Römischen Staatsverfassung" (2 volumes; 1884, 1891). In 1871, he published "Untersuchungen über die bildungsgeschichte der griechischen und lateinischen sprache" (Studies on the educational history of Greek and Latin languages).
