= Ehrenbach =

- Ortsteil of Idstein
- Interactive map of Ehrenbach
- Location within Germany Location within Hesse
- Coordinates: 50°12′0″N 8°13′18″E
- Country: Germany
- State: Hesse
- Admin. region: Darmstadt
- District: Rheingau-Taunus-Kreis
- Town: Idstein
- Elevation: 349 m (1,145 ft)

Population (2021-12-31)
  - Total: 300
- Time zone: UTC+01:00 (CET)
  - Summer (DST): UTC+02:00 (CEST)

Ehrenbach is a village, first mentioned in 1371, that became in 1971 part of Idstein, Hesse, Germany.

== Location ==
It is located southwest of Idstein in the Ehrenbach valley. The Upper Germanic-Rhaetian Limes borders it in the south. The highest point is the Scheid mountain (472 m high=, in the north-west. The district road (Kreisstraße) K 707 connects Ehrenbach with the B 417 in the south-west and Idstein and the Bundesautobahn 3 in the north-east.

== History ==
Ehrenbach was first mentioned in a document in 1371, as Ernbach. A 1475 document (Weistum) of the Auroffer Grund named Nassau-Idstein as ruler of two Ehrenbach. In 1566, the village had twelve households (Hausgesess), and in 1609 ten households.

In 1971, the independent village decided, together with two other settlements, to become part of Idstein. The Stadtteil became a Ortsbezirk with elected representatives (Ortsbeirat, headed by the Ortsvorsteher, according to the Hessische Gemeindeordnung. Since 1977, Idstein has been part of the Rheingau-Taunus-Kreis. In 2011, the 2011 German census counted 291 inhabitants, 24 of them foreigners (8,2 %), living in 132 households.

== Buildings ==
Ehrenbach features many timber-frame buildings. The Türmchen, serving as a Protestant church, was restored in 2020. A reconstructed Roman watch tower is part of the Kastell Zugmantel complex of the Limes World Heritage Site.

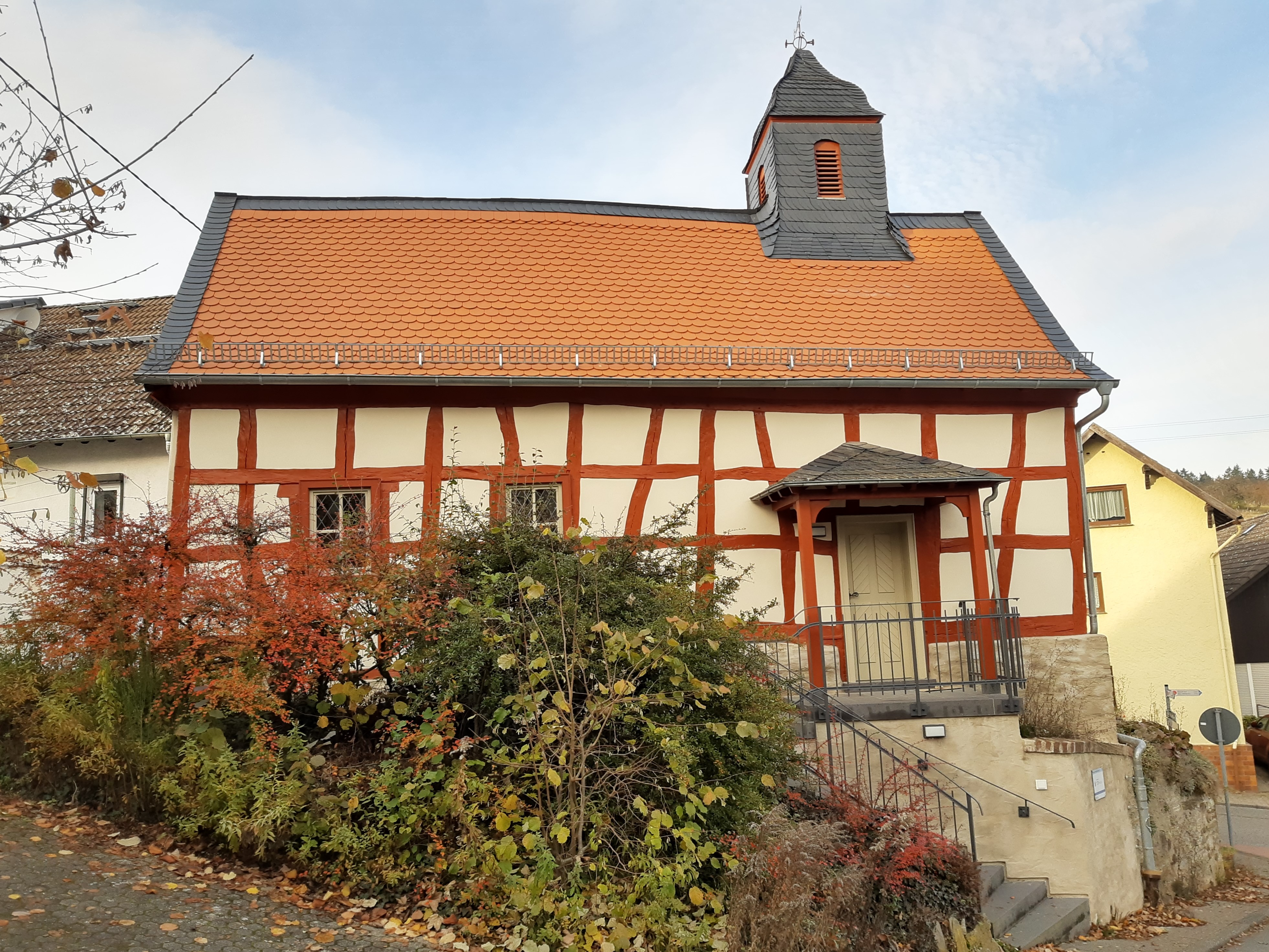
Türmchen

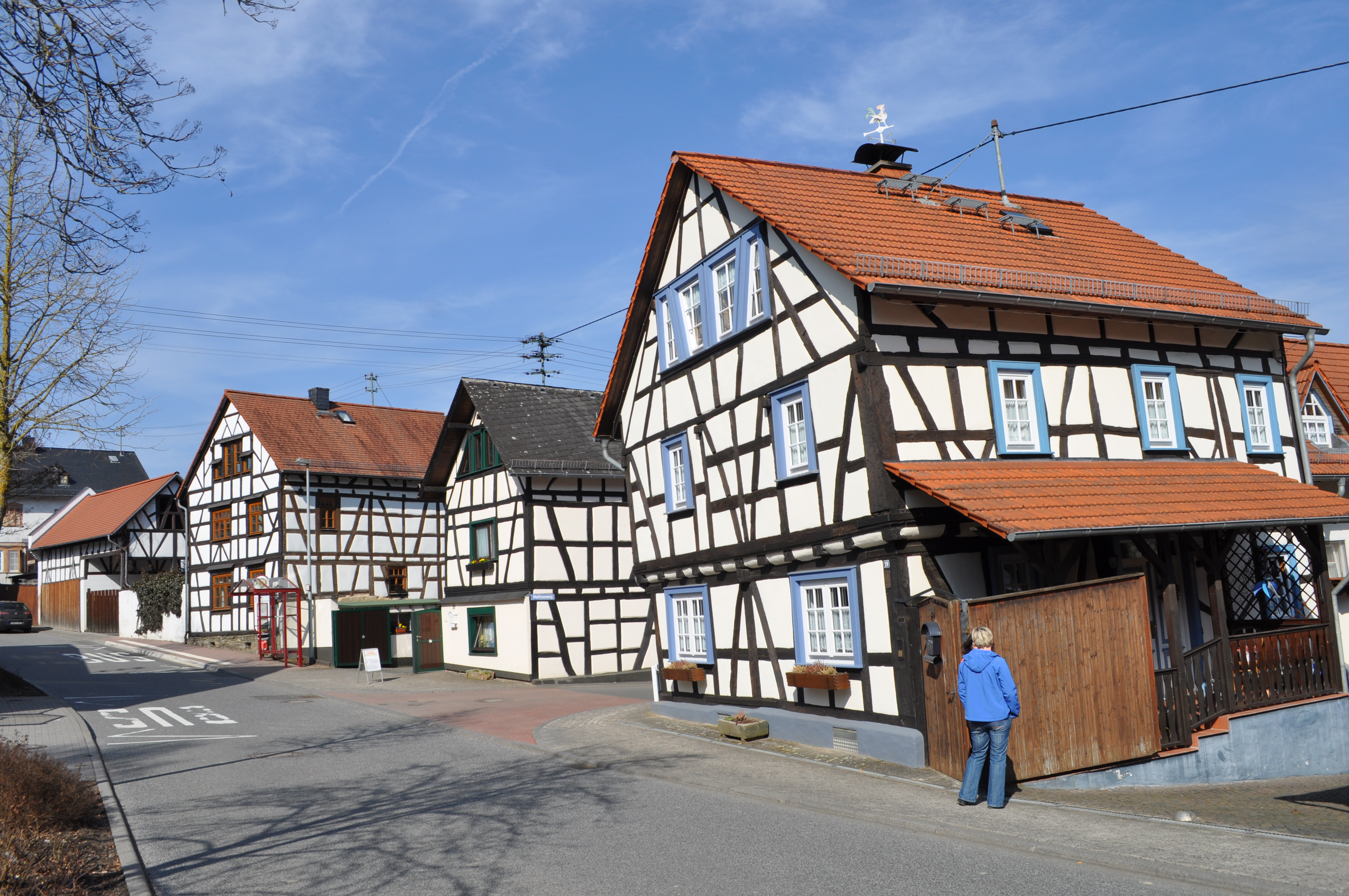
Zugmantelstraße

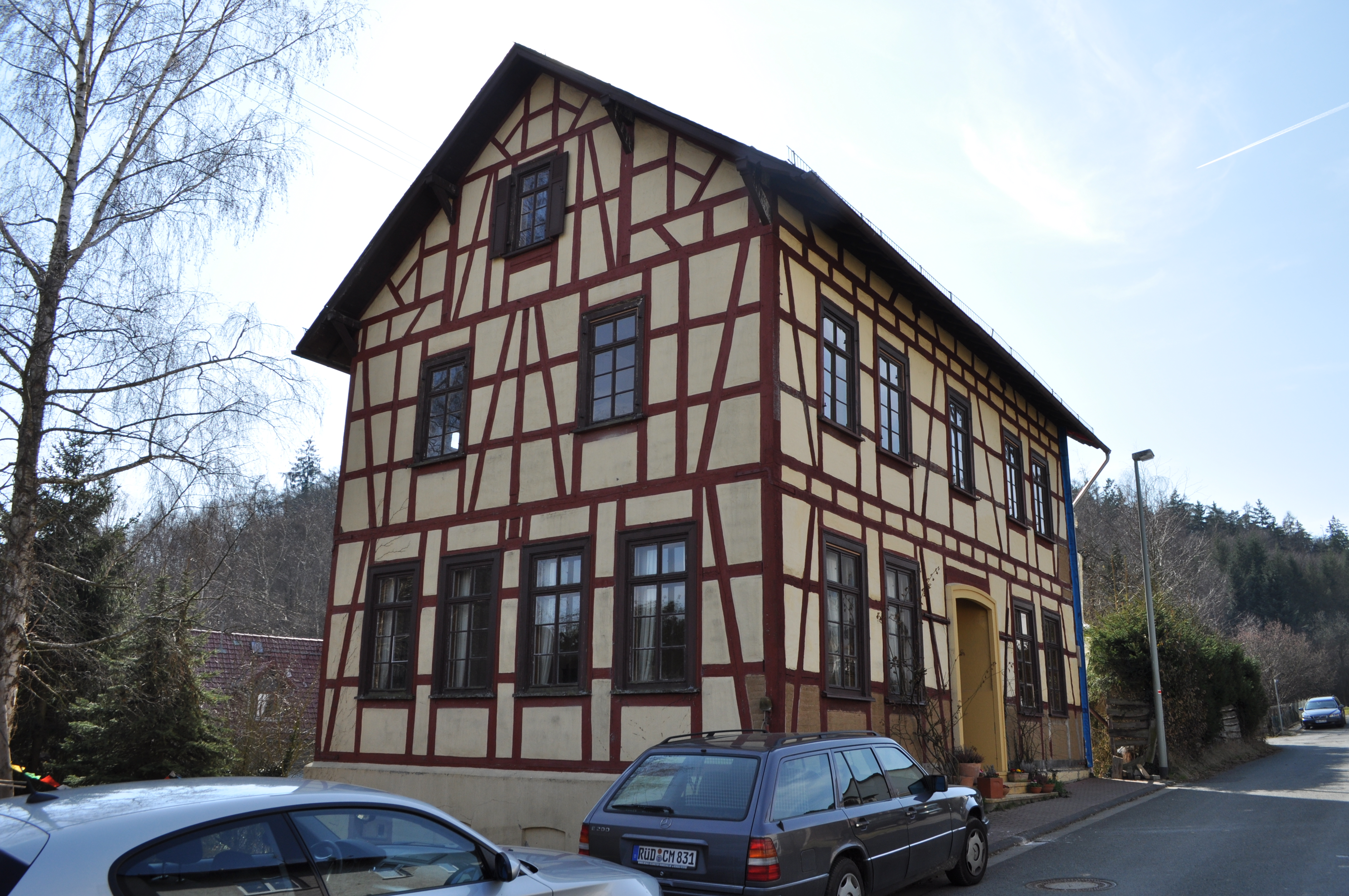
Former school
