= Imperial Limes Commission =

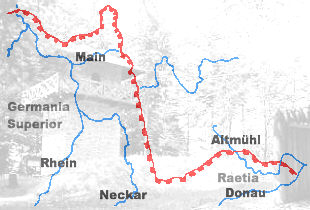
Route of the Upper Germanic-Rhaetian Limes

The Imperial Limes Commission (German: Reichs-Limeskommission) or RLK, was set up to work out the route of the Upper Germanic-Rhaetian Limes, the Roman frontier north of the Alps, and the location of its associated forts at the time of the Roman Empire. It was the first institution to engage in a cross-border, historical project after German Unification in 1871.

== Introduction ==
The Upper Germanic-Raetian Limes, constructed around 100 AD, has been a UNESCO World Heritage Site since 2005, and has been of interest in scholars since the 16th century as the outer border of the Roman Empire. Aventinus (fl.c.1500) was the first to deal with a presumptive part of the limes at Eichstätt, which he ascribed to the Emperor Probus. Until the 19th century, theories were repeatedly proposed about the Limes. Special mention is deserved by Christian Ernst Hanßelmann, who recognized connections between the Rhaetian wall in Bavaria and remains of walls in the Taunus in the 18th century. Increasingly, the archaeological remains were inventoried and protected. In particular by the Association for Ancient History (Verein für Altertumskunde) in Ellwangen, which began major investigations in 1819.

In 1852, the commission was founded to study the Limes Imperii Romani. Several associations tried to conduct the research systematically and across state borders. However, the still independent states of the German Confederation wanted to maintain their cultural sovereignty even after the unification of their territory into the Reich. Thus, in 1877 and 1888 in the Kingdom of Württemberg, and in 1880 in the Grand Duchy of Hesse and in the Grand Duchy of Baden State Limes Commissions were appointed, which would successfully identify the course of the Limes in several places. However, these individual researches could not answer all questions by far.

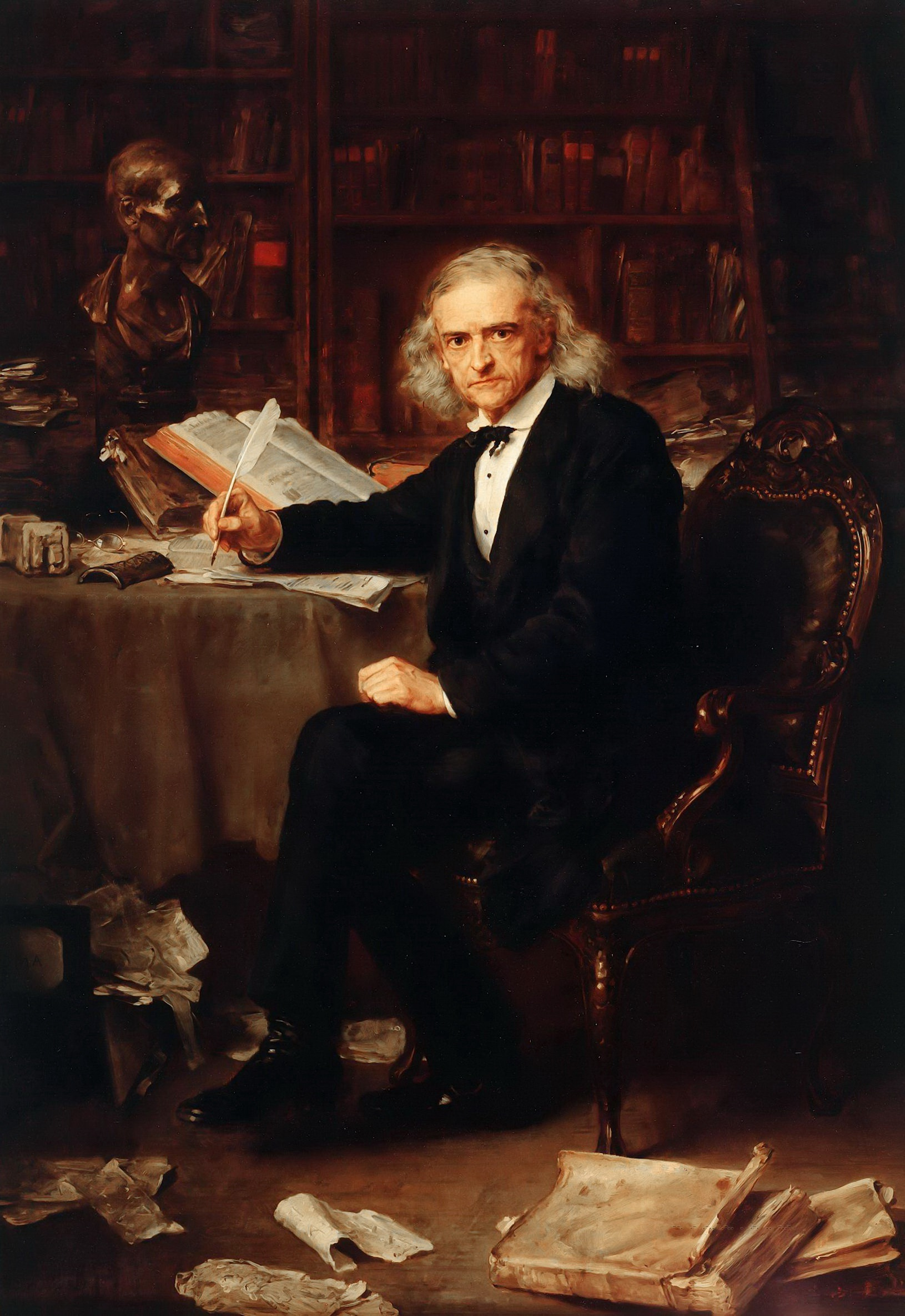
Theodor Mommsen around 1881

In 1883 a circle of researchers and interested parties led by the ancient historian Theodor Mommsen, which had demanded the organization and financing of centralized Limes research since the founding of the Reich, proposed a solution. A first attempt in 1873 failed due to the personnel issues, a second attempt in 1878 at least led to an organizational plan. Among those who pushed the project were, in addition to Mommsen, retired Major General Karl Johann von Veith, representative of the Prussian General Staff, Heinrich von Sybel, Georg Waitz, and Richard Schöne. The work was carried out by officers with the support of local experts. The cost was originally estimated at 150,000 Reichsmarks. However, the project finally failed in 1882 in the Reichstag, because the deputy Wilhelm Oechelhäuser had taken offense over the direction by the General Staff and the Berlin dominance of the project.

Mommsen failed to make further advances because he had fallen into political opposition to Otto von Bismarck and had lost his backing.

== Founding ==
After Mommsen had enlisted his colleagues in the southern countries of the Reich, especially Heinrich von Brunn, through their various contacts the five states involved came to an agreement. On December 28, 1890, there was a Limes conference in Heidelberg. All five states sent their own representatives. Baden was represented by Karl Zangemeister and Ernst Wagner, Bavaria by Karl Popp and Heinrich von Brunn, Hesse by Friedrich Kofler, Prussia by Friedrich Wilhelm von Leszynski, Heinrich Nissen and Mommsen, and Württemberg by Ernst von Herzog and Eduard Paulus. In addition, Wilhelm Conrady and Louis Jacobi participated. Indirectly, the selection had been controlled by Mommsen. All those who had been called had previously dealt with Limes research. Binding decisions were not possible, but the recommendations were made to set up a commission of eight people. One representative from each of the five affected states, one member each of the Royal Prussian and Bavarian Academy of Sciences and a second representative from Württemberg, which had the longest stretch of the Limes. The base of the commission would be Heidelberg. the Limes was divided into sections ("Strecken"), which were to be numbered and assigned to volunteer section directors (Streckenkommissaren). Directors should preferably be high school teachers, heads of local clubs, and army officers. For the project, five years and a budget of 130,000 Reichsmarks were estimated. The next day this amount was raised as a precaution to 200,000 Reichsmarks. The work program was approved without objection.

Everything seemed to go according to plan, and the first installment was paid in September, 1891. But then the budget committee of the Reichstag rejected further assumption of the costs for financial reasons. However, personal motives also played a role. On January 16, 1892, there was a debate in the Reichstag, during which Mommsen was accused of plagiarizing the ideas of Karl August von Cohausen and personally attacked. Rudolf Virchow defended Mommsen and eventually the budget was restored.

== Start of work ==
The first meeting of the Limes Commission was held April 7 to 9, 1892, in Berlin. The participants were the same as those of the Heidelberg meeting plus Jacobi and Paulus. Hesse now sent Wilhelm Soldan, Prussia Cohausen, who had not been invited to the Heidelberg meeting. In addition, the Düsseldorf state director Wilhelm Klein and the Chief Education Minister Friedrich Althoff as well as a representative of the interior minister of the imperial privy council Schroeder took part. The decisions of the first meeting were largely confirmed, the most important innovation being the establishment of a managing committee, which included Zangemeister as chairman, plus Herzog and Popp. With the consent of the governments involved, the statute was enacted on May 17. On June 6 and 7, 1892, the constituent meeting of the commission took place in Heidelberg. Mommsen was elected chairman, Brunn elected his deputy. After decades of preparation, work could begin. Until 1898, the archaeological head of the investigations was Felix Hettner, the director of the Rheinisches Landesmuseum Trier.

The commission's work has been very productive, with more than four decades of research into Limes-forts. From 1902 Ernst Fabricius (Professor of Ancient History in Freiburg im Breisgau) was head of the Reichs-Limeskommission. The publication series, the "Limeswerk", Der obergermanisch-raetische Limes des Roemerreiches, appeared between 1894 and 1937 as 56 separate parts.

== Publications ==
- Ernst Fabricius, Friedrich Leonhard, Felix Hettner, Oscar von Sarwey (et al.): Der obergermanisch-raetische Limes des Roemerreiches. Published by the Imperial Limes Commission. mind. 15 Bde. O. Petters, Heidelberg-Berlin-Leipzig, 1894–1937 (Codex-Verlag, Böblingen 1973 (partial reprint), Greiner, Remshalden, 2005ff. (partial reprint). ISBN 3-935383-72-X).
- Jürgen Oldenstein (ed.): Fundindex zu Der obergermanisch-raetische Limes des Römerreiches. Zabern, Mainz, 1982, ISBN 3-8053-0549-4.
- Reichs-Limes-Kommission (publ.): Arbeitsplan. Heidelberg 1892–1898. (Printing and filming by UB Heidelberg).
- Bericht über die Arbeiten der Reichslimeskommission. de Gruyter, Berlin, 1892–1897, Reimer, Berlin 1898–1903. (Printing and filming by Heidelberg UB, Speyer Pfälzische LB).
- Jahresbericht der Dirigenten, auf Grund d. § 9 d. Statuts d. Reichs-Limes-Kommission. Freiburg Br.-Trier-Charlottenburg 1892–1904. (Printing and filming by UB Heidelberg et al.).
- Limesblatt. Mitteilungen der Streckenkommissare bei der Reichslimeskommission. Trier 1, 1892 – 7, 1903, No. 1–35 (Digitized by the UB Heidelberg).

== Literature ==
- Kurt Böhner: Die archäologische Erforschung der „Teufelsmauer“. Zum 100jährigen Bestehen der Reichs-Limes-Kommission. In: Nürnberger Blätter zur Archäologie 9, 1992–93, pp. 63–76.
- Rainer Braun: Die Geschichte der Reichs-Limes-Kommission und ihre Forschungen. In: Der Römische Limes in Deutschland. Theiss, Stuttgart, 1992 (Sonderheft Archäologie in Deutschland) ISBN 3-8062-1024-1 pp. 9–32.
