= Türmchen =

Coordinates: 50°12′00″N 8°13′15″E

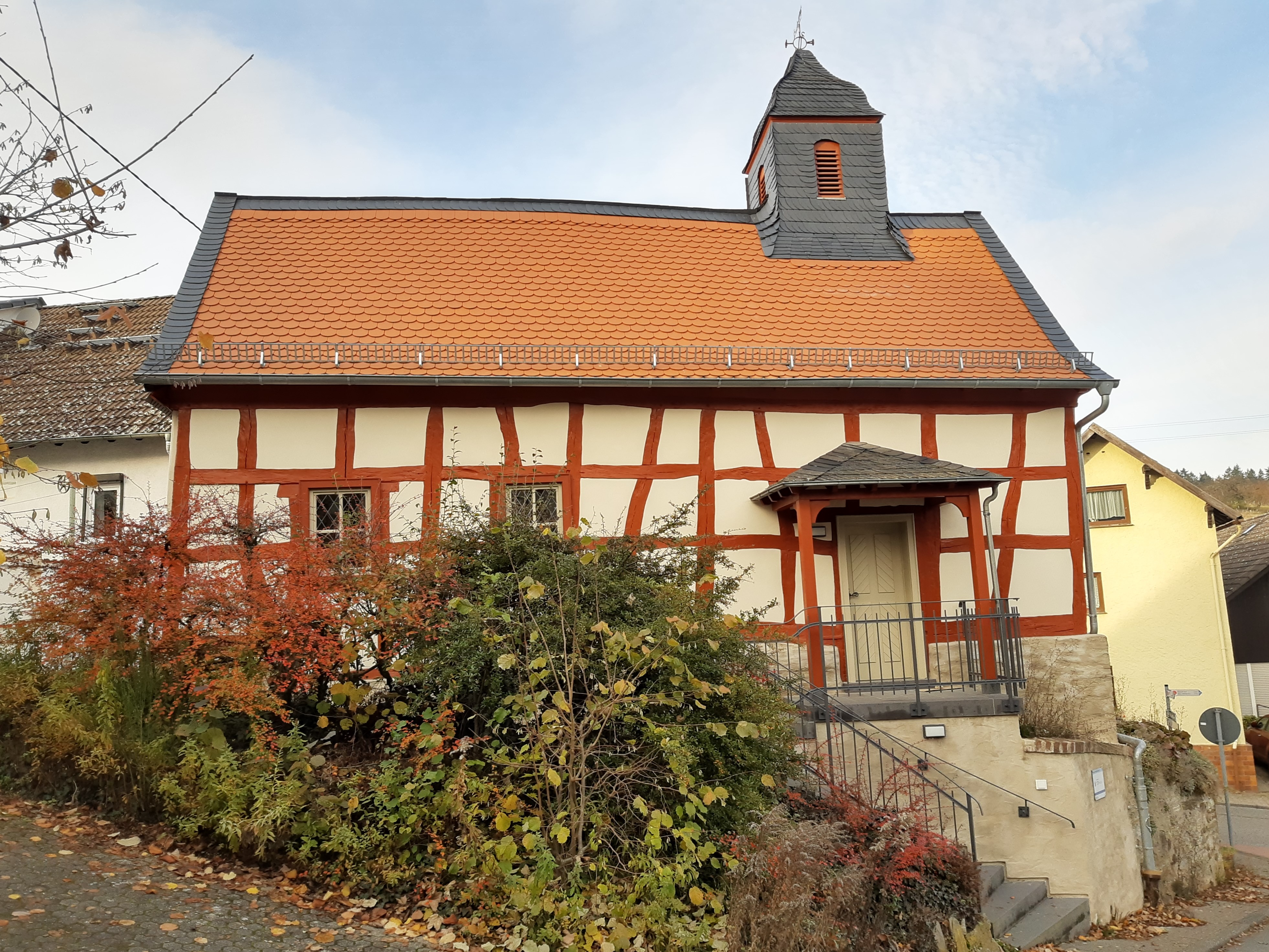
- Türmchen from the south
- Türmchen
- Location: Idstein-Ehrenbach, Hesse, Germany
- Denomination: Protestant Church in Nassau

History
- Consecrated: 1982

The Türmchen (Little tower) in Ehrenbach, an Ortsteil of Idstein, Hesse, Germany, is a fachwerk building from around 1780 that served various purposes. The listed historic monument has been a Protestant chapel since 1982.

== History ==
The Türmchen was built around 1780 on an elevated ground as a Hirtenhaus (shepherds' house).

The building belongs to the town of Idstein.The street address is Malbachweg 1. In 19821, it was consecrated as a chapel, and now serves for monthly church services of the Oberauroff/Görsroth/Eschenhahn parish of the Protestant Church in Hesse and Nassau. The building was completely restored over two years beginning in 2019. It is a listed historic monument.

== Building ==
The Türmchen is located on a level higher than the street, supported by a wall. Based on a high foundation of Bruchstein (quarry stone), it is a fachwerk (timber-framed) construction with a gable roof. The roof is built of timber cut in winter 1685/86. The slated ridge turret is much younger, built between 1737 and 1757. In was erected as a clock tower, long before the usage of the building as a church. It explains the common name. The only entrance on the south side is reached by stairs. An original second door was blocked. Nowadays, the building comprises only a single simple rectangular room.Two dividing walls were abolished for the conversion to religious use.
