= Kastell Zugmantel =

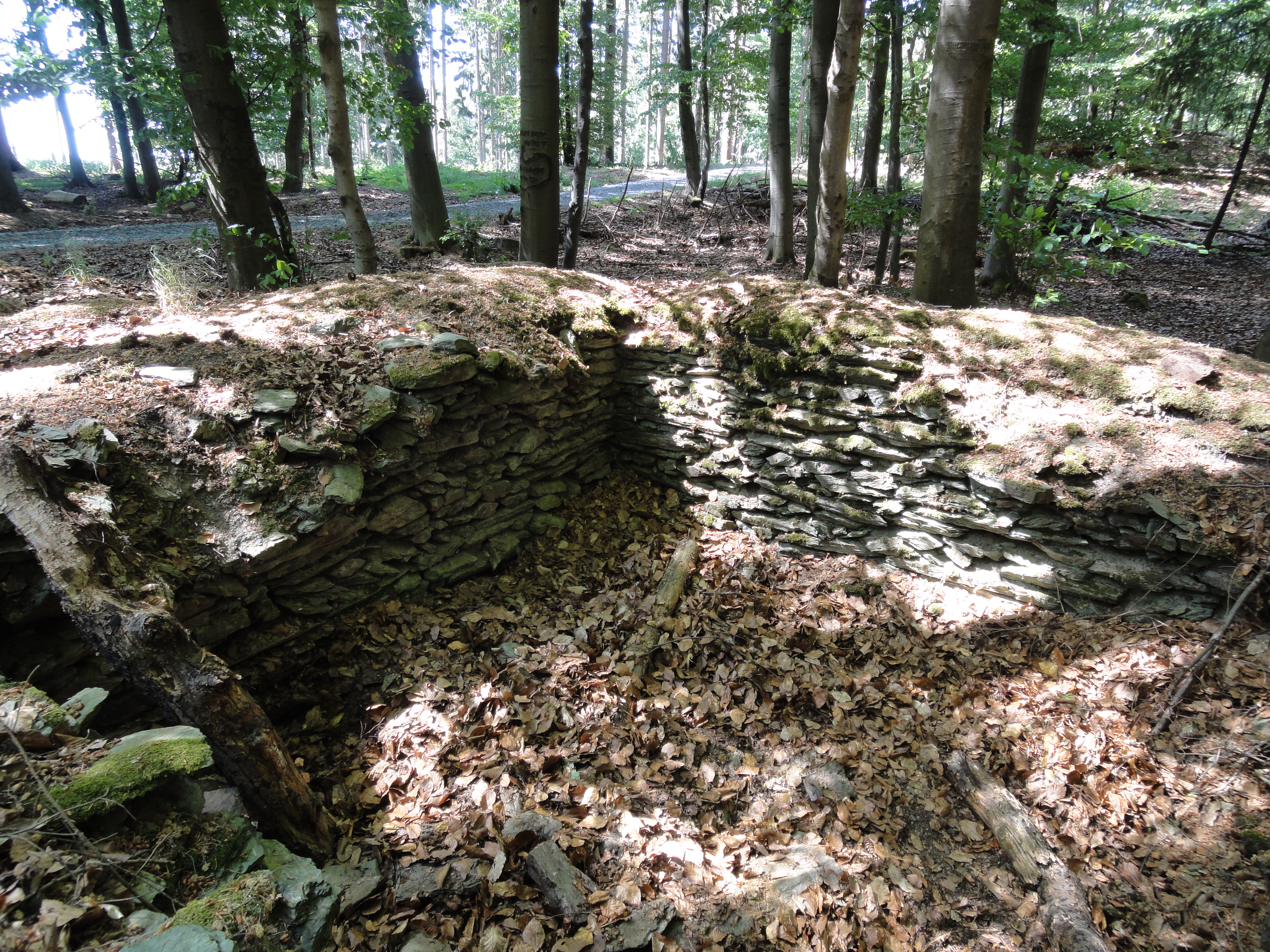
- Remains of a watchtower in 2011
- Limes: ORL 8 (RLK)
- Section (RLK): Upper Germanic-Rhaetian Limes, Section 3
- Date(s) occupied: around 90 to around 260
- Type: a)-c) Numerus fort d) Cohort fortress
- Unit/Formation: a)-c) Numerus Treverorum d) Cohors I Treverorum equitata
- Size: a) 0.7 ha b) 1.1 ha c) 1.7 ha d) 2.1 ha
- Coordinates: 50.18970°N 8.20344°E
- Previous fort: ORL 9 Kastell Alteburg (east)
- Following fort: ORL 9 Adolfseck (east)

Kastell Zugmantel (Latin name unknown) is a former Roman garrison site designed for a complement the size of a cohort. The facility is located on the western Taunus section of the Upper Germanic-Rhaetian Limes, and has been a UNESCO World Heritage Site since 2005. The above-ground remains in the area, still very visible, are located in a forest edge area of Taunusstein-Orlen in the Hessian Rheingau-Taunus-Kreis.

The fort was originally constructed under the Flavians (c.90 AD) and rebuilt three times. The four building phases are indicated as a–d.

== Location ==
The remains of the fort and the vicus, along with a reconstructed watchtower and reconstructed section of the Limes are located about one kilometer northeast of the village Taunusstein-Orlen, at the point where the Hühnerstraße—the present B 417—crosses the Limes between Orlen and Ehrenbach.

Before and during the Roman era the Hühnerstraße was an important link between the densely populated Germanic Limburg basin and the Rheingau, with Aquae Mattiacorum, today's Wiesbaden, as the capital of the Civitas Mattiacorum and Mogontiacum, today Mainz, as the capital of the Roman province Germania Superior. Military surveillance was necessary for the security of this territory.

The remains of the fort are located at a height of about 455 metres (1,493 ft) on the outskirts of a larger forest. The southern and southeastern areas of the site were disturbed by the creation of a sports field and a commercial enterprise. Further disturbances were caused by modern expansion of the Hühnerstraße.

An approximately 2.5 kilometres (1.6 mi) long nature trail leads through the area today.
