= Heinrich Jacobi (archaeologist) =

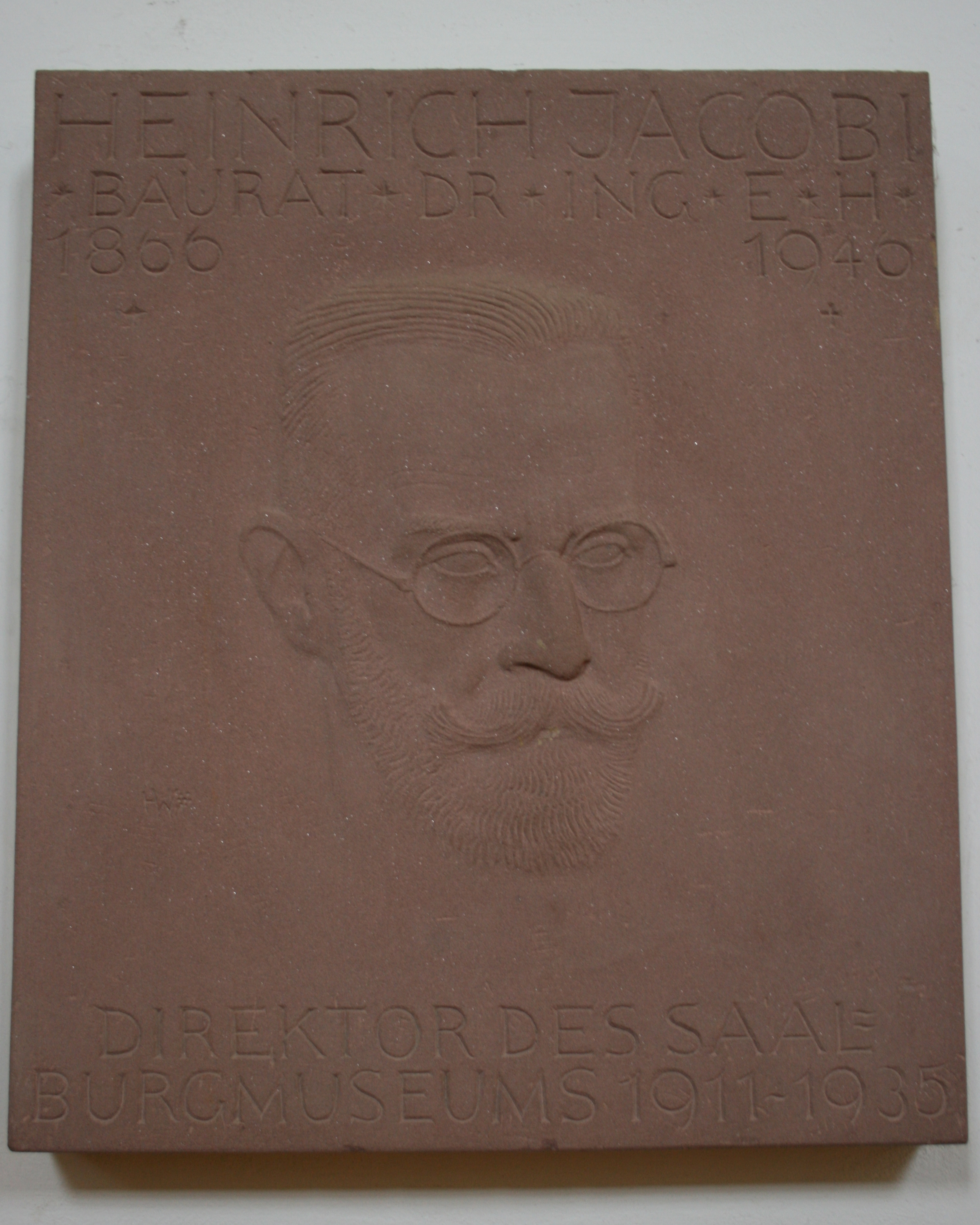
Sandstone memorial to Heinrich Jacobi at the Saalburgmuseum

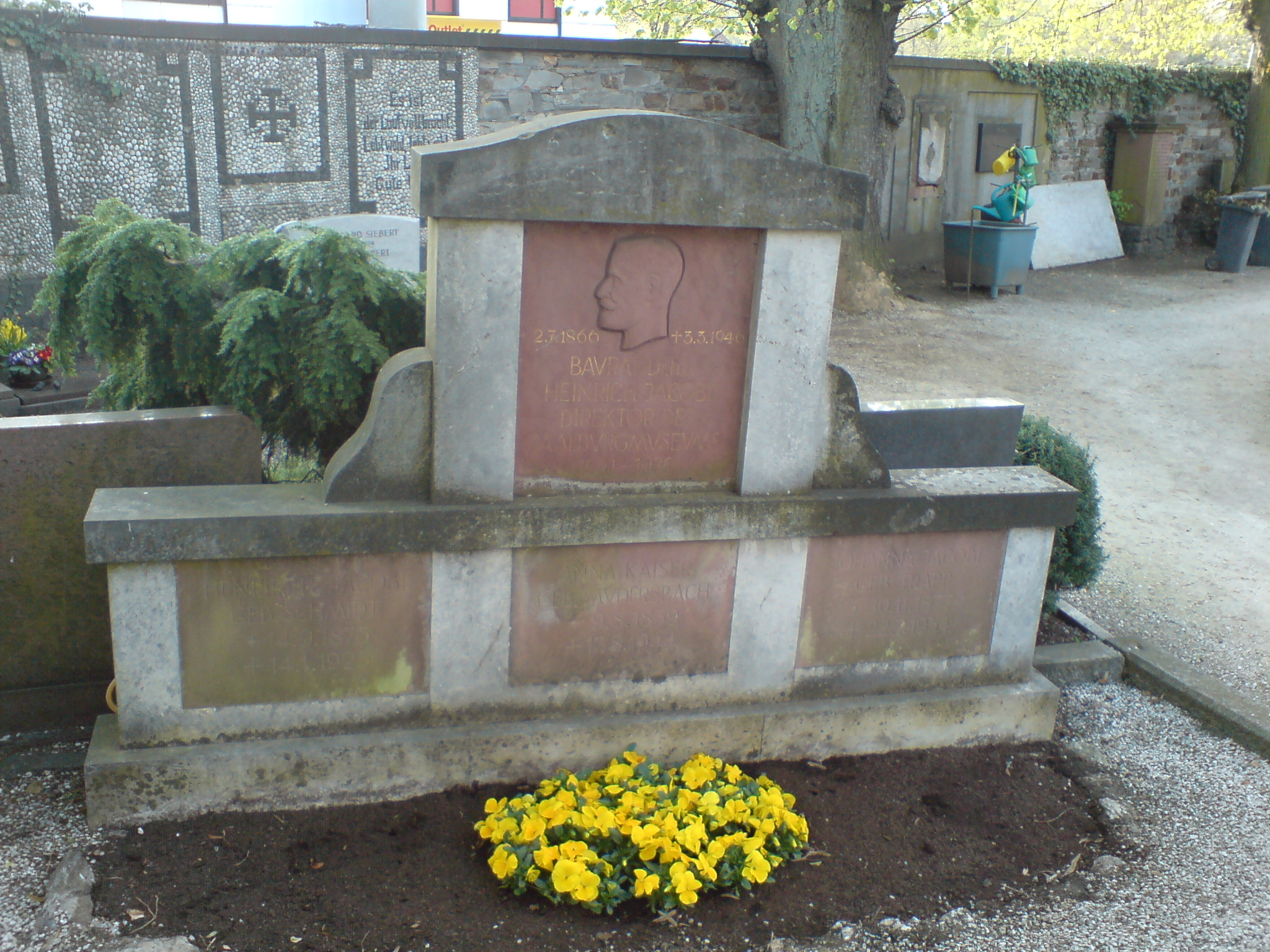
Grave of Heinrich Jacobi

Heinrich Christian Jacobi (2 July 1866 – 3 March 1946) was a German architect and archaeologist, specialising in the Roman Empire. He was born and died in Homburg vor der Höhe.

== Life ==
Heinrich Jacobi was son of Louis Jacobi (another archaeologist of the Roman Empire) and his wife Henriette Will. He studied architecture from 1886 to 1891 at the Technischen Hochschule Charlottenburg; during his studies he belonged to the Landsmannschaft Normannia fraternity. From 1895 to 1896, he led excavations in Adamclisi in Romania and travelled to see excavations of Roman sites in north Africa. He was later Regierungsbauführer (referendary) in Marburg, where in 1896 he became Regierungsbaumeister (Assessor). In 1899, the Prussian government gave him a job in Homburg vor der Höhe. There he became a member of the Royal Buildings Council (Königlichen Baurat) and State Building Inspector (Landesbauinspektor), both in 1911. The following year he succeeded his father as director of the Saalburgmuseum. He also collaborated with his father on the restoration of the Saalburg. He designed a Protestant Gedächtniskirche on the Weberstraße in the Kirdorf district of Bad Homburg – this opened on 18 August 1913.

His first marriage to Henriette Louise was childless, though they adopted a daughter, Hildegard, nicknamed Hilde. In autumn 1914 he became a Hauptmann of the Landwehr in the Ersatz-Bataillon of the 80th Fusilier Regiment in Wiesbaden. In 1915, he was put in command of a battalion of the 83rd Reserve Infantry Regiment in Homburg After the end of the First World War he resumed his duties as director of the Saalburgmuseum. After his first wife's death in 1925, he remarried in 1926 to Henriette Louise Johanna Trapp, daughter of Eduard Christian Trapp. Heinrich also received an honorary doctorate in 1926. He held his post as director until 1936, well past the usual age limit, and took on the role again from 1945 to 1946.

== Awards ==
- Date unknown – Order of the Red Eagle, 4th class
- 1915 – Iron Cross, 2nd class
- 1916 – Hessische Tapferkeits-Medaille
- 1917 – Order of Franz Joseph, officer's cross with war decoration, personally presented by Charles I of Austria
- 1917 – Order of Saint Alexander, officer's cross with swords
- 1918 – Bulgarian Medal for Science and Art
- 1918 – Service Cross for War Assistance

== Works ==
- Das Erdkastell der Saalburg. Sonderdruck aus dem Saalburg Jahrbuch. Bericht des Saalburgmuseums VI. 1914/1924. Frankfurt 1924.
- Führer durch das Römerkastell Saalburg und Homburg vor der Höhe. Schudt, Homburg 1905. 7. Auflage 1913.
- Kleiner Führer durch die Saalburg und ihre Sammlungen. Taunusbote, Bad Homburg 1918.
- Führer durch die Saalburg und ihre Sammlungen. Taunusbote, Bad Homburg 1921. 27. Auflage 1927.
- Die Saalburg: Führer durch das Kastell und seine Sammlungen. Taunusbote, Bad Homburg 1929. 13. Auflage 1936.
- Die Homburger Eisenbahn und ihre Vorläufer. Sonderdruck des Taunusboten, Bad Homburg 1938.

== Bibliography ==
- (in German) Dieter Planck, Andreas Thiel (ed.s): Das Limes-Lexikon. Roms Grenzen von A bis Z. Beck, München 2009, ISBN 978-3-406-568169, S. 64.
