= Eduard Christian Trapp =

Eduard Christian Trapp (31 October, 1804 - 26 September, 1854) was a German medical doctor, most notable as the founder of the spa baths in Homburg vor der Höhe, where he later died.

== Life ==
Born in 1804 in Lauterbach, he first lived in Homburg vor der Höhe between 1808 and 1817, whilst his father was court physician to the landgrave of Hesse-Homburg. He also remained there to studied medicine, as well as travelling to Paris and Vienna. He got a job as second physician to the court and town, as well as a military surgeon. During his studies he became a member of the Alten Gießener Burschenschaft Germania in 1822.

On 4 December 1838 he married Charlotte Johannette Auguste von Grolman (born 19. April 1817 in Darmstadt), daughter of August Konrad Hofmann, later finance minister of Hesse-Darmstadt - they had five children, including August (later an officer in the Imperial Austrian Navy).

Eduard discovered the source of what is now the Elisabethenquelle in what is now the Kurpark and asked his chemist friend Justus von Liebig to test the water and confirm its healing properties. He then used lectures and science publications to promote the waters and hosted tourists to the spa in his own villa on Kaiser-Friedrich-Promenade, now a listed monument - some of the early ones included Prince William of Prussia and Augusta of Saxe-Weimar-Eisenach in 1844. Some criticised him, but the town recognised him, making him an honorary citizen. The landgraf appointed him his personal physician, but Eduard died unexpectedly aged 49 in 1854. He was buried in the town's Protestant cemetery.

== Bibliography ==
- (in German) Gerta Walsh: Große Namen in Bad Homburg. Frankfurt a. M. 1997.
- (in German) Gerta Walsh: Bad Homburger Fassaden. Frankfurt a. M. 2002.
