= Rijswijk, Gelderland =

Rijswijk
- Village
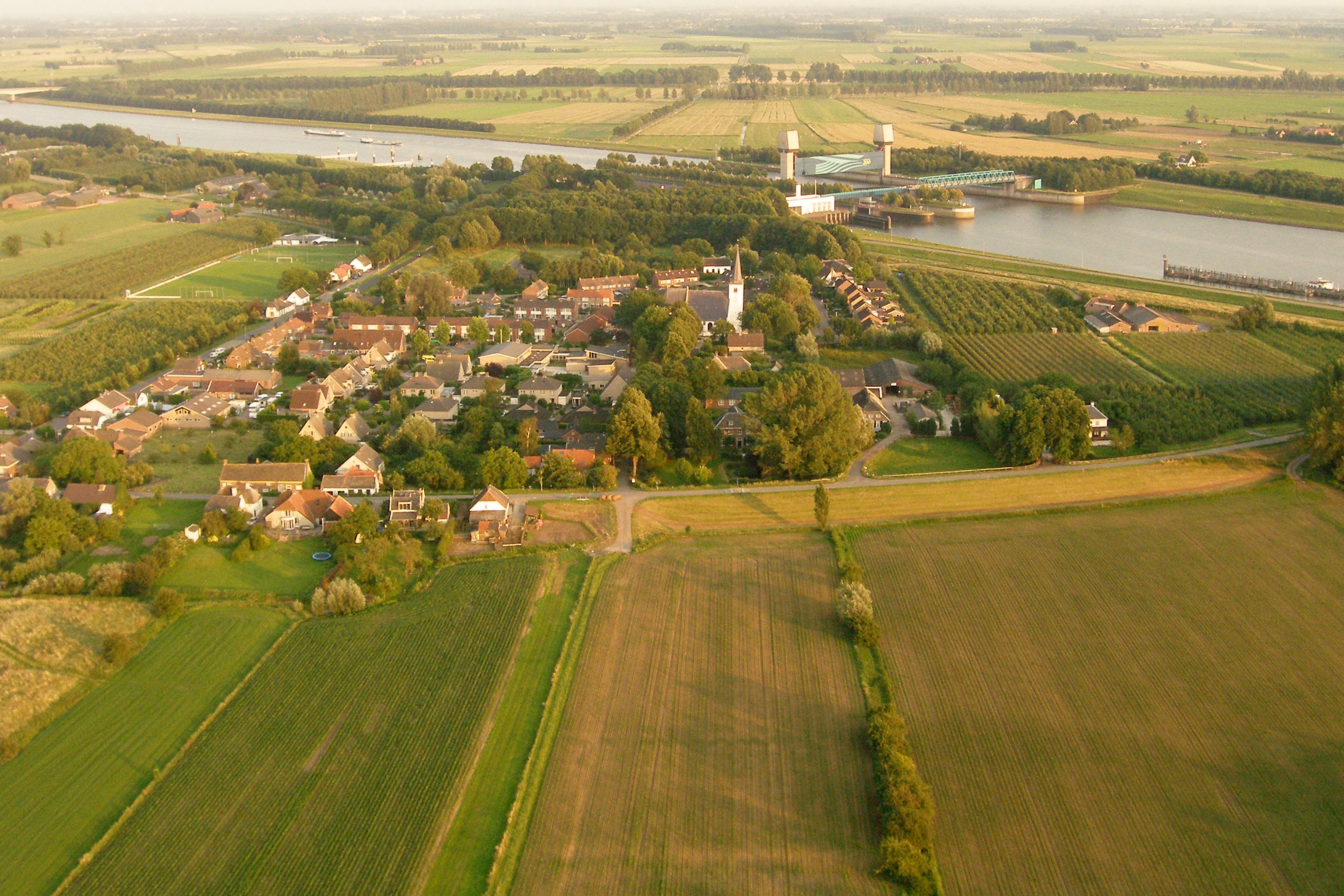
- Seen from the air

- Location in the province of Gelderland Rijswijk (Netherlands)
- Coordinates: 51°58′N 5°21′E
- Country: Netherlands
- Province: Gelderland
- Municipality: Buren

Area
  - Total: 5.05 km^{2} (1.95 sq mi)
- Elevation: 4 m (13 ft)

Population (2021)
  - Total: 525
  - Density: 104/km^{2} (269/sq mi)
- Time zone: UTC+1 (CET)
  - Summer (DST): UTC+2 (CEST)
- Postal code: 4023
- Dialing code: 0345

Rijswijk is a village in the Dutch province of Gelderland. It is a part of the municipality of Buren, and lies about 9 km north of Tiel.

It was first mentioned between 918 and 948 as Risuuic, and means "neighbourhood near twigs". The village developed along the Nederrijn as a stretched out settlement. The church tower dates from around 1500 and has a 14th-century base. The church dates from the 16th century. In 1840, it was home to 536 people.

The grist mill De Hoop dates from 1703. It was restored in 1966 and 2002–2003.

== Gallery ==
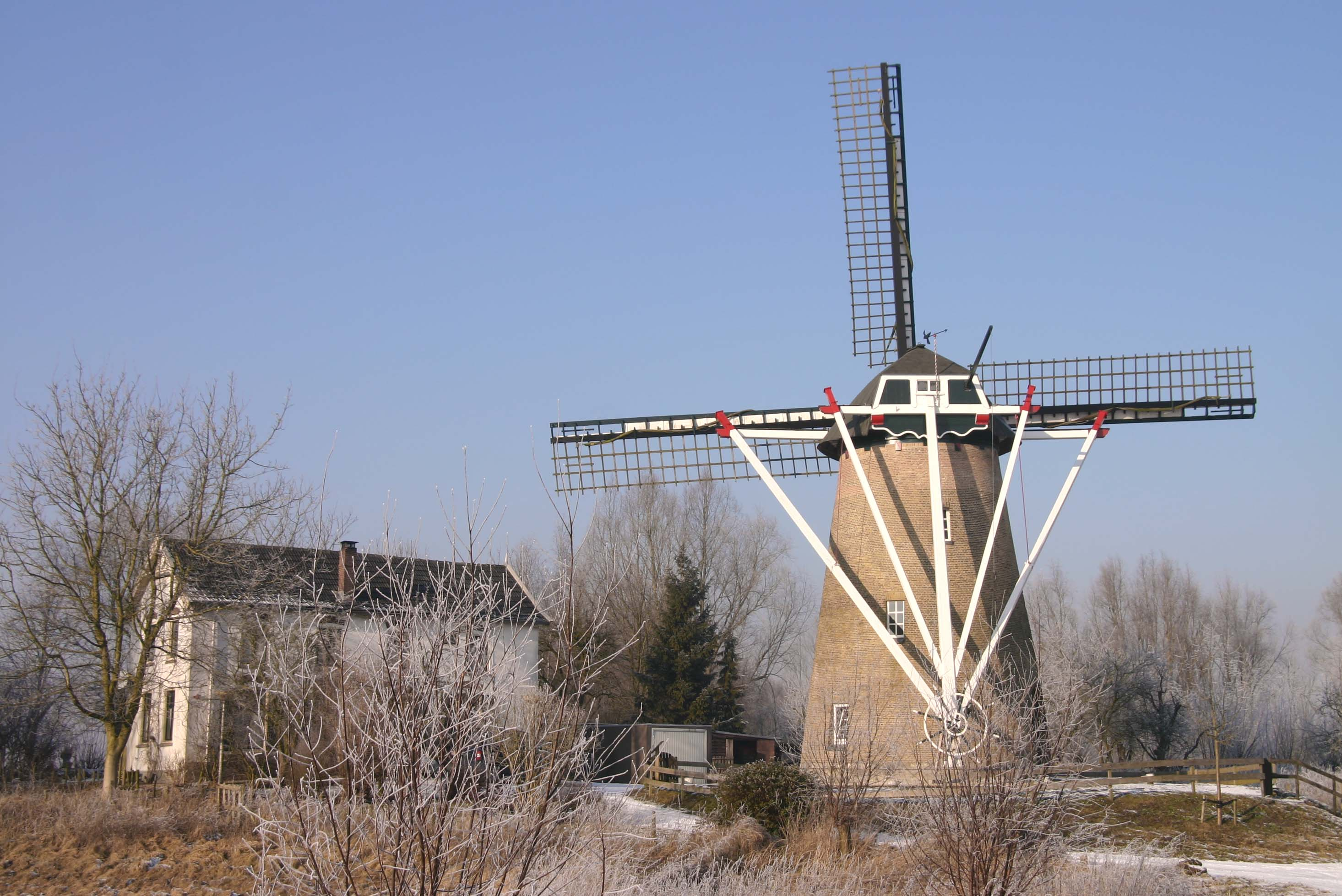
Windmill De Hoop

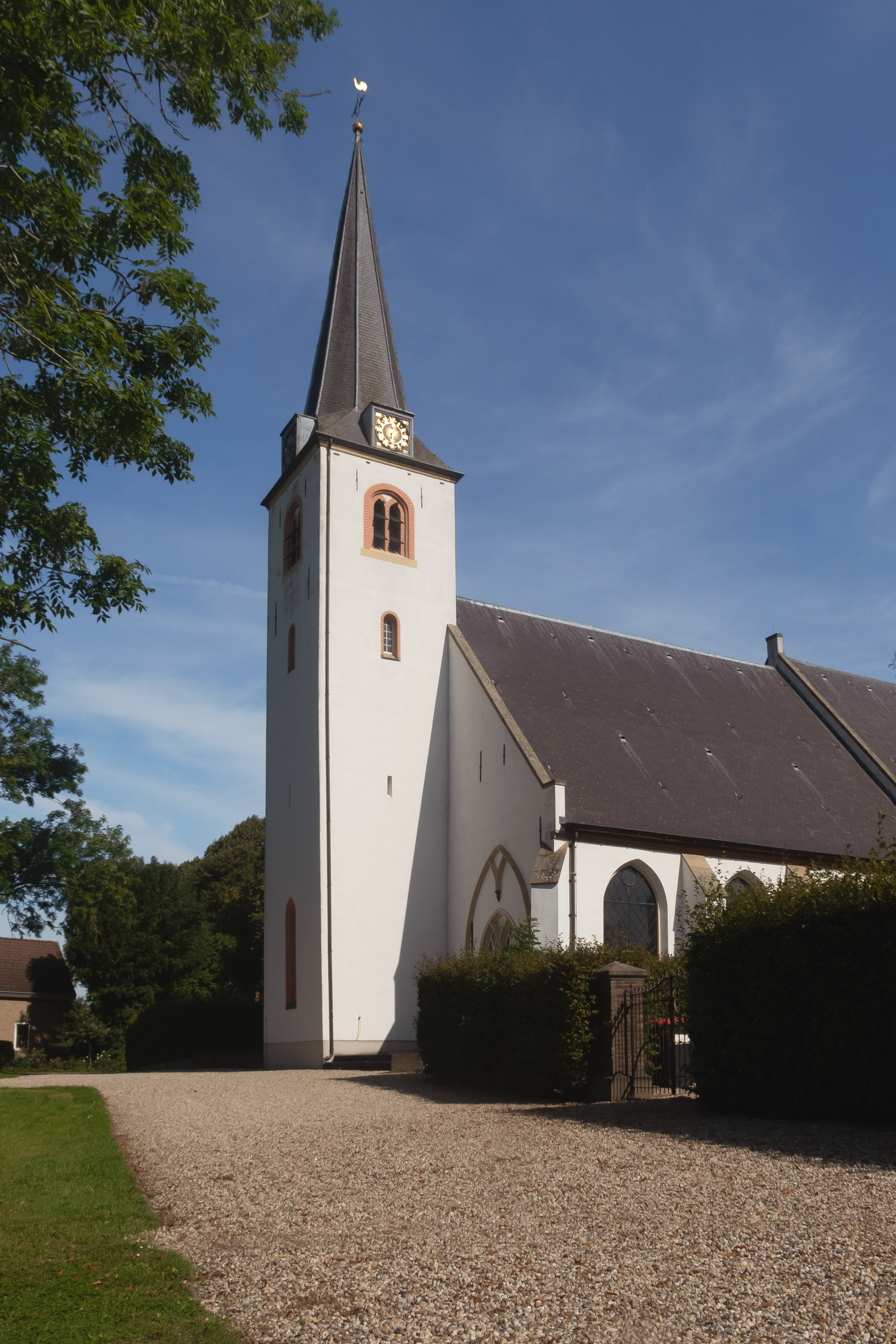
Rijswijk, church: the Martinuskerk

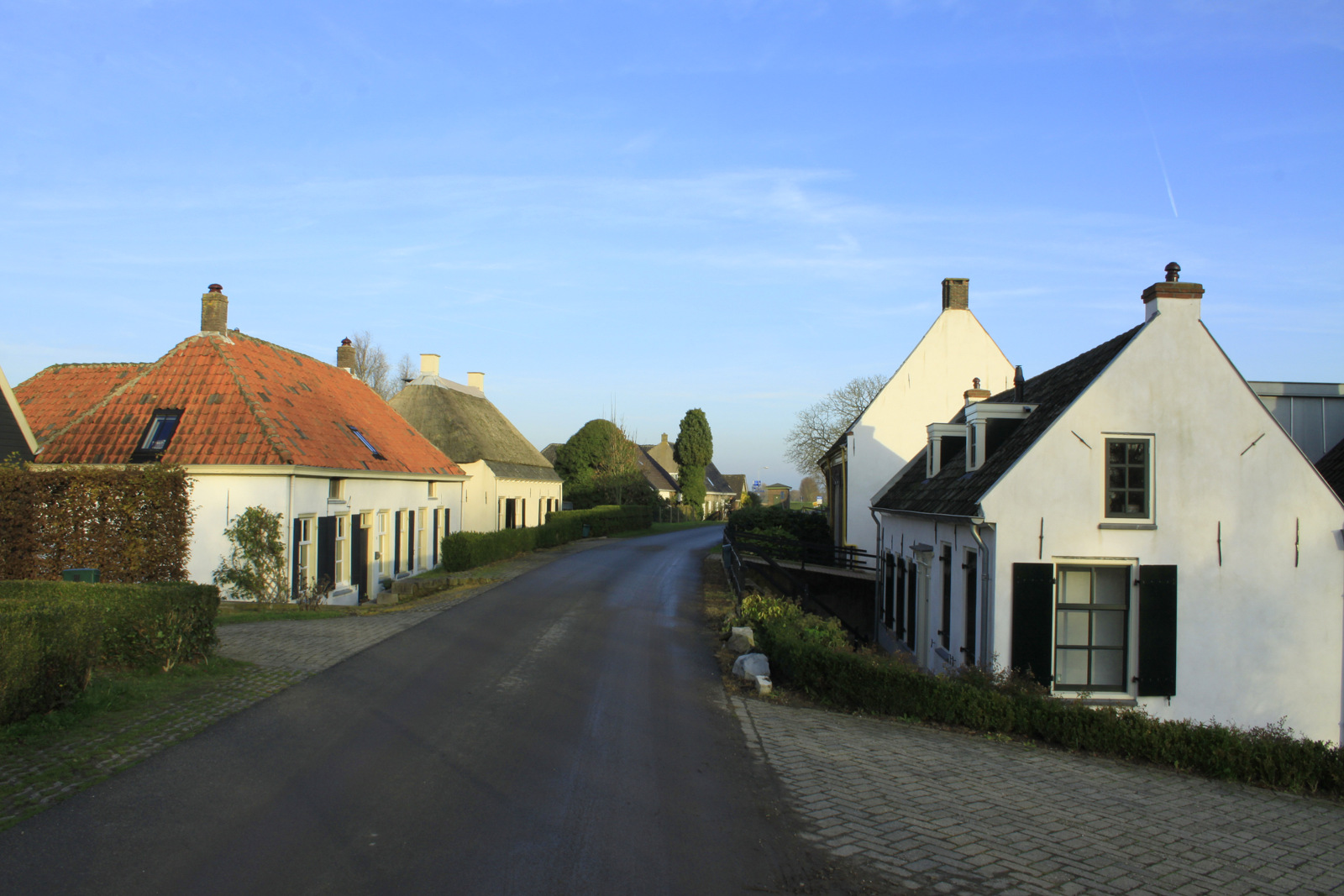
Village street

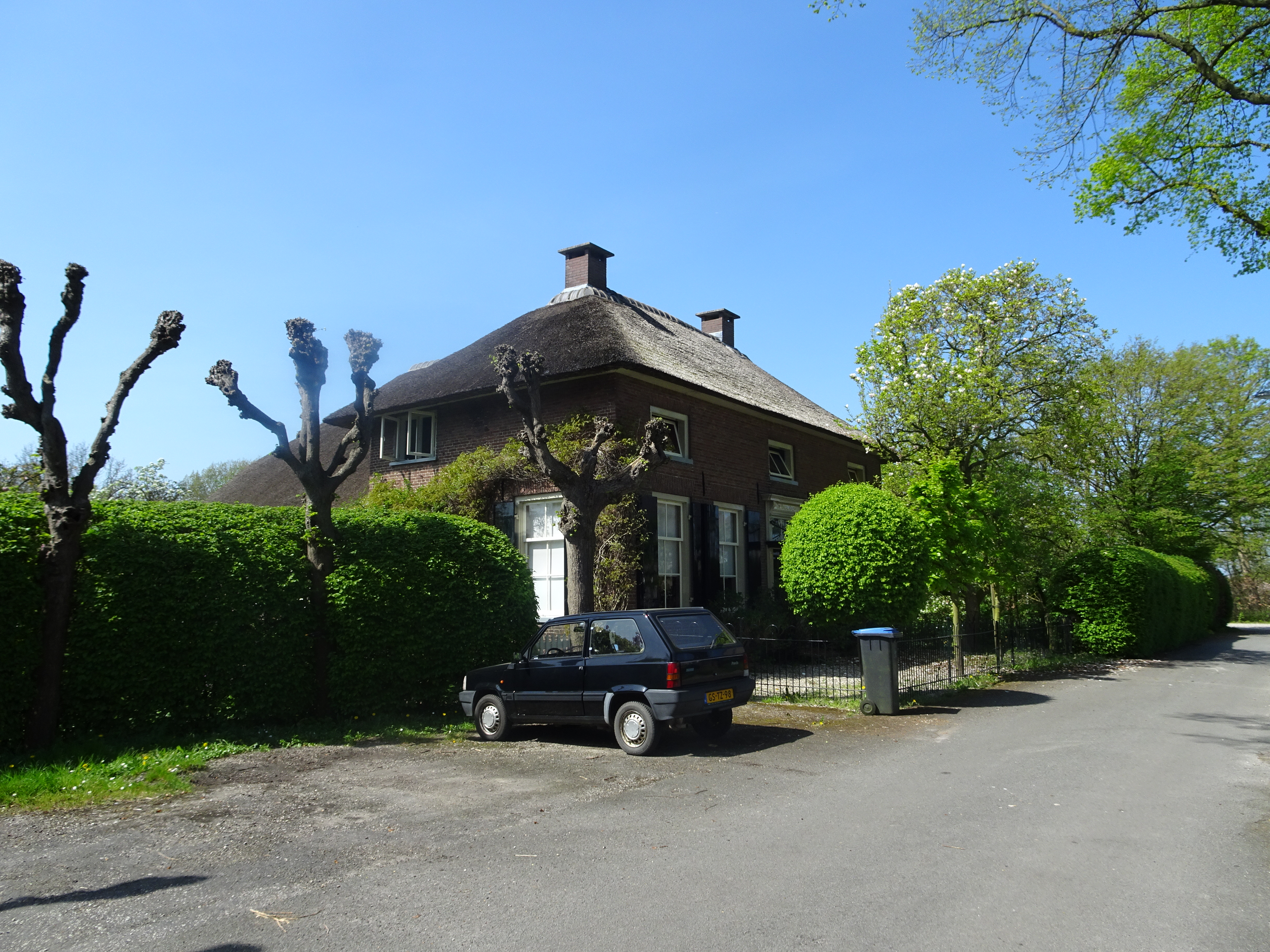
Former schoolteacher's house
