= Louis Jacobi =

German architect and archaeologist

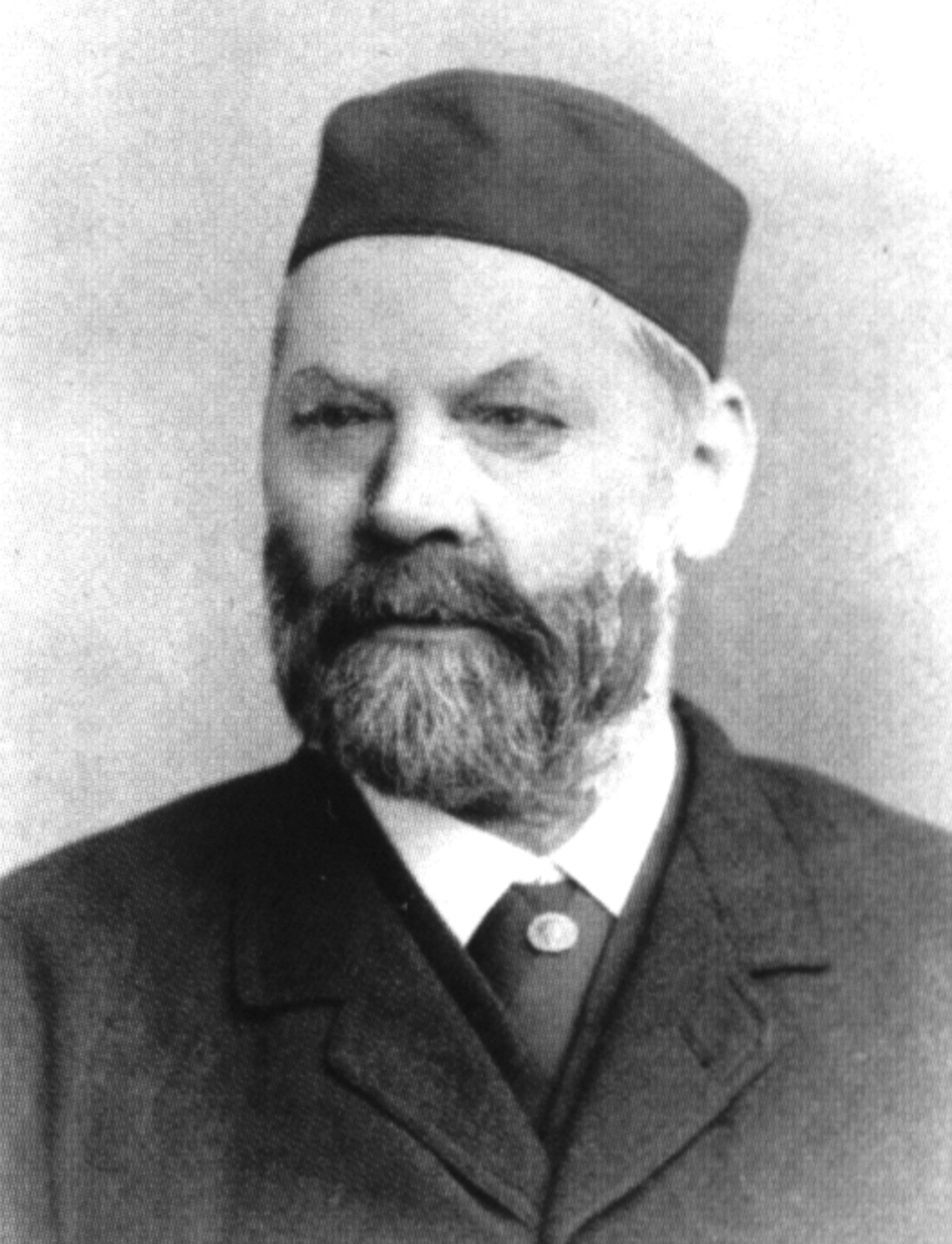
Louis Jacobi

Louis Jacobi (21 April 1836 – 24 September 1910) was a German architect and archaeologist. He is most notable for his 1889 dig in Pompeii and his reconstruction of the Saalburg Roman site - he collaborated on the latter with his son Heinrich Jacobi. He was born and died in Homburg vor der Höhe.
