= Kastell Wörth =

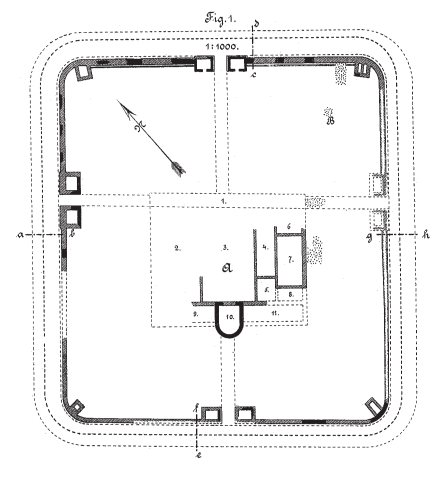
Plan of Kastell Wörth by Wilhelm Conrady, 1887

Kastell Wörth was a Roman limes numerus fort located on the north-western edge of today's Wörth am Main in the German state of Bavaria. The fort was probably part of the defenses of the Main Limes, and also, as part of the Upper Germanic-Rhaetian Limes, but also of the older Odenwald Limes section of the Neckar-Odenwald Limes, but this has not been definitively proven archaeologically.

== Relation to other forts ==
The starting point of the Odenwald Limes has not to date been definitively determined; one possibility is the fortress at Obernburg (ORL 35), built between 100 and 110 AD, but this question can only be resolved by further excavations. Some evidence also suggests that it may be Wörth (ORL 36), but significant dateable finds are lacking. What is certain is that the origin of the Odenwald Limes, whose next identified fort is Kastell Seckmauern (ORL 46b), is in the region between the two nearby forts of Obernburg and Wörth. Recent research suggests that the "Pfitschengraben", a deep wooded gorge that provides a direct connection between the Main and Kastell Seckmauern, may represent the beginning of this stretch of Limes. This would also explain the absence of any traces of watchtowers between Seckmauern and Wörth. Trennfurt Roman Fort (ORL 37), lying somewhat further along in the direction of the Main, is ruled out from consideration because it is more recent. It appears that Wörth was garrisoned only after the fort at Obernburg, and after the earth and timber fortifications of Seckmauern were constructed, since to date no late south Gaulish Terra Sigillata appears among the finds there. Pieces of this pottery are found, however, in other forts of the Odenwald Limes. This suggests that Seckmauern, never fortified in stone and later bisected by a palisade, was quickly abandoned and replaced by Wörth.

== Research and construction history ==
Wörth was first identified in 1882–83, and archaeologically excavated from 1887 to 1890 by the Imperial Limes Commission (Reichs-Limeskommission) by section commissioner Wilhelm Conrady.

The excavations found a stone numerus fort 93 metres (305 ft) long and 84 metres (276 ft) wide. The Porta Praetoria, the main gate of four, is to the northeast, towards the Main. The fort was secured by towers in each corner, and surrounded by a double moat, according to Conrady. In the interior only the Principia, the headquarters building, could be identified; all other buildings were constructed of wood and were not detectable by the excavation methods of the time. Through a geophysical survey at the beginning of the twenty-first century it was determined that a portion of the fortifications on the south side had fallen in a heap into the moat.

The dates of construction and abandonment of the fort have not yet been identified. Scattered evidence and inscriptions point to a possible construction in the time of Domitian, but the majority of the total scant finds date from the middle second to the early third century.

In addition, nothing is known about the auxiliary units stationed here. Possibly one may be the Numerus Brittonum et Exploratorum Nemanigensium (Troop of Britons and Scouts of the River Mümling). This assignment is somewhat problematic, however, as the same unit is identified at Obernburg.

Today the fort is only visible to the trained eye through slight irregularities in the ground. A slight raised area in the southwest of the fort is located in cultivated land, and locally is called the "Obere Au." Otherwise none of the structure is visible.

A virtual reconstruction of the fort together with archaeological finds and information is located in the community center in Wörth. This permanent exhibit is affiliated with the Wörth Shipping and Shipbuilding Museum (Schifffahrts- und Schiffbaumuseum Wörth am Main).

Around 45 metres (148 ft) southeast of the Porta Principalis Dextra are the fort's baths, in the middle of a fenced orchard, of which nothing can be seen today. The baths went through several stages of rebuilding.

The associated vicus was identified northwest of the fort in 2004 through a geophysical survey. Because of later building the original extent of the village is no longer visible in the topography.

== Course of the Limes between Wörth and Seckmauern ==
From Kastell Wörth the Limes runs irregularly in a westerly direction. Until it reaches Seckmauern there are believed to be three unidentified sentry posts, based on topography and the distance between two identified watchtowers, but they have not been proven archaeologically. An additional watchtower (Wp 10/4 "Bei der feuchten Mauer") is believed to be located in the immediate vicinity of Kastell Seckmauern, but has not been identified. The course of the Limes itself is not completely known; at best the fosse is now a flattened depression 80 to 85 centimetres (31 to 33 in) deep and around 110 centimetres (43 in) wide.

ORL (Note: ORL = Numbering of Limes structures according to the publications of the Reichs-Limeskommission on the Obergermanisch-Rätischen-Limes)	Name	Description
ORL 36 (Note: ORL XY = sequential numbering of the forts according to ORL)	Kastell Wörth	
Wp 10/1/ (Note: Wp = sentry post, watch tower. The number before the slash indicates the Limes section, the number after the slash the particular watch tower in sequential order.)	"Moorrain"	Only suspected, not proven archaeologically.
Wp 10/2	"Auf dem Schneeberg"	Only suspected, not proven archaeologically.
Wp 10/3	"Im Pförtchen"	Only suspected, not proven archaeologically.
ORL 46b	Kastell Seckmauern	(Note: 49°47′56.5″N 9°7′2.5″E)
Wp 10/4	"Bei der feuchten Mauer"	Only suspected, not proven archaeologically.

== Historic preservation ==
Kastell Wörth and the adjoining Limes construction are archaeological monuments (Bodendenkmale), according to the Bavarian Monumen Protection Law (Bayerischen Denkmalschutzgesetz (BayDSchG)). Investigation and the collection of artifacts are subject to approval, with chance finds to be reported to the authorities.

== Excavation reports ==
- Wilhelm Conrady, in the series Der obergermanisch-raetische Limes des Roemerreiches (Pub. Ernst Fabricius, Felix Hettner, Oscar von Sarwey): Section B, vol 3 Kastell Nr. 36 (1900)
- Ernst Fabricius, Felix Hettner, Oscar von Sarwey: Der obergermanisch-raetische Limes des Roemerreiches, Section A, vol 5: segment 10 (Der Odenwaldlimes von Wörth am Main bis Wimpfen am Neckar), 1926, 1935
