= Main Limes =

Roman fortifications in Germany

The Main Limes (German: Mainlimes), also called the Nasser Limes, was built around 90 AD and, as part of the Upper Germanic-Rhaetian Limes, formed the frontier of the Roman Empire in the area between the present day villages of Großkrotzenburg and Bürgstadt. In this section the limes adjoined the River Main (Moenus), which forms a natural boundary for about 50 kilometres here, so "Main" refers to the river.

== Development ==
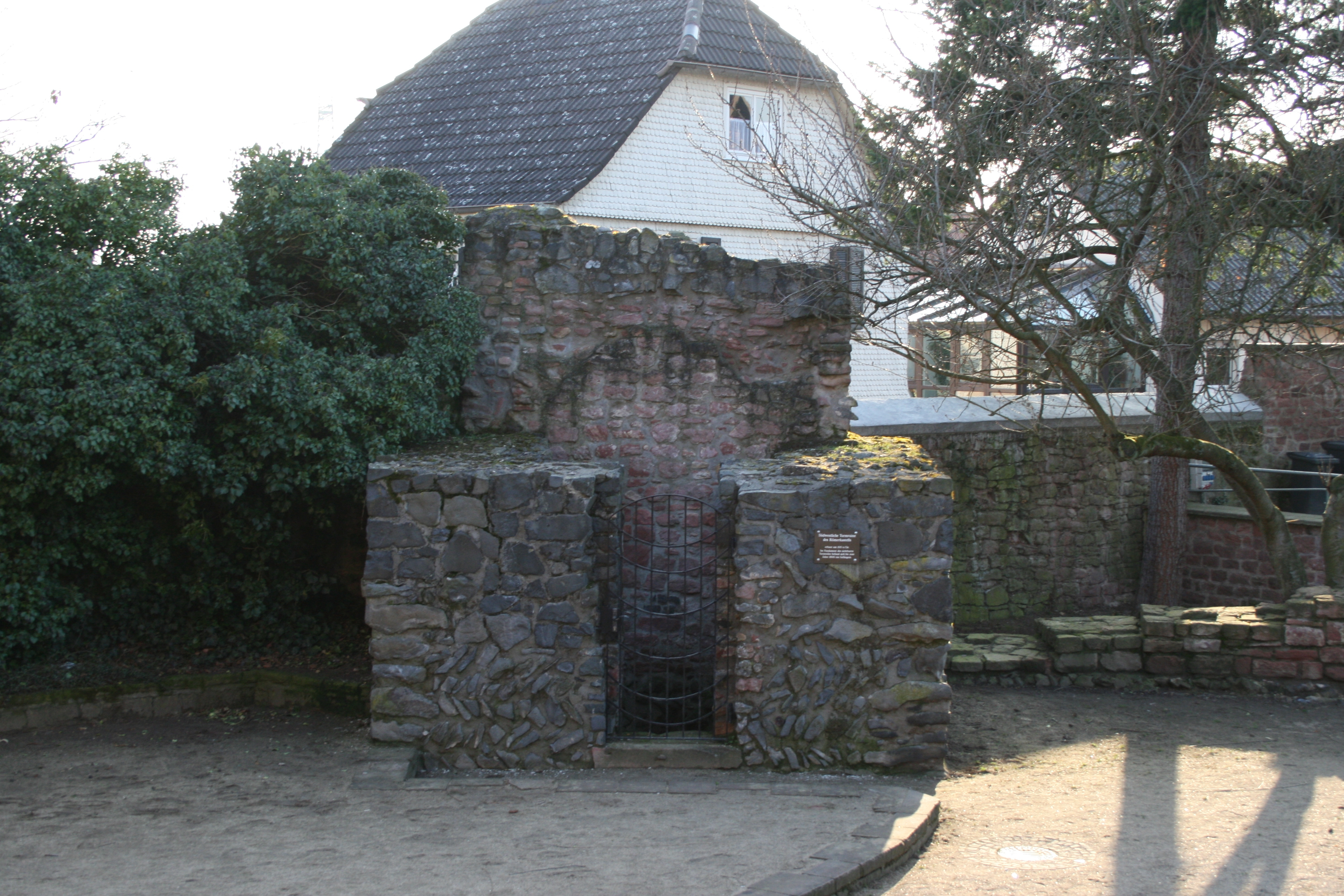
The southwestern corner tower of Großkrotzenburg Roman camp – because it continued to be used until modern times, it has largely survived

In order to secure the riverbank, it was sufficient to erect free-standing towers backed up by the forts of the units stationed nearby; there was never a continuous barrier of palisades and ditches here. However, of the many watchtowers that probably stood along the Main, to date only one south of Obernburg am Main has been identified. On the other bank of the Main was the largely uninhabited Spessart, a wooded hill range which, like the Odenwald which borders it to the south-west, was particularly interesting for the Romans, especially because of its timber. In inscriptions, there are reports of the logging vexillationes of the 22nd Legion, which were stationed in Obernburg, Stockstadt and Trennfurt.

In the majority of forts, settlement activity continued after the fall of the limes, which is why, as in Obernburg Niedernberg, Seligenstadt and Großkrotzenburg, they are now located below the medieval village centres. In Grosskrotzenburg, Hainstadt, Stockstadt and Obernburg, Alamannic artefacts were also discovered.

== Route ==
North of the Main the limes initially runs through the marshy terrain of the Schifflache and Bulau before linking up with the Wetterau Limes. At the crossing of the Main at Großkrotzenburg a Roman bridge has been identified from post sockets (Pfahlschuhe). In the south it extended in its early period to Obernburg or Wörth. The exact start point of the Odenwald Limes (Obernburg or Wörth) has still not been clearly identified. When the Odenwald Limes was abandoned in the 2nd century AD by Antoninus Pius and the establishment of the newer limes in the Bauland, the Main Limes was also extended, because the forts in Trennfurt and Miltenberg were added (newer Main Limes).

== Forts ==
Fort	ORL	Location	Visible remains/Remarks
(Hainstadt Roman Fort)	--	Hainburg-Hainstadt	modern buildings on the site, no traces, few records
Großkrotzenburg Roman Fort	23	Großkrotzenburg	mediaeval buildings on the site, visible wall remains, road layout reflected in the village street plan
Seligenstadt Roman Fort	32	Seligenstadt	mediaeval buildings on the site, no traces
Stockstadt Roman Fort	33	Stockstadt am Main	modern buildings on the site, no traces
Niedernberg Roman Fort	34	Niedernberg	mediaeval buildings on the site, no traces of buildings, road layout reflected in the village street plan
Obernburg Roman Fort	35	Obernburg am Main	mediaeval buildings on the site, no traces of buildings, road layout reflected in the village street plan
Wörth Roman Fort	36	Wörth am Main	barely visible terrain marks
Trennfurt Roman Fort	37	Klingenberg am Main-Trennfurt	no longer any visible terrain marks, not built on, Roman votive stone in the tower of Trennfurt Church
Miltenberg-Altstadt Roman Fort	38	Miltenberg	Location partly marked
Miltenberg-Ost Roman Fort	38a	Miltenberg/Bürgstadt	modern buildings on the site in places, no traces

== Records ==
Because little remains of the forts, Roman artefacts are displayed especially in local museums such as Obernburg Romand Museum, Miltenberg Municipal Museum, Aschaffenburg Diocesan Museum and Großkrotzenburg Museum. Several fort sites such as Obernburg and Stockstadt have a rich collection of stone monuments.

== Gallery ==
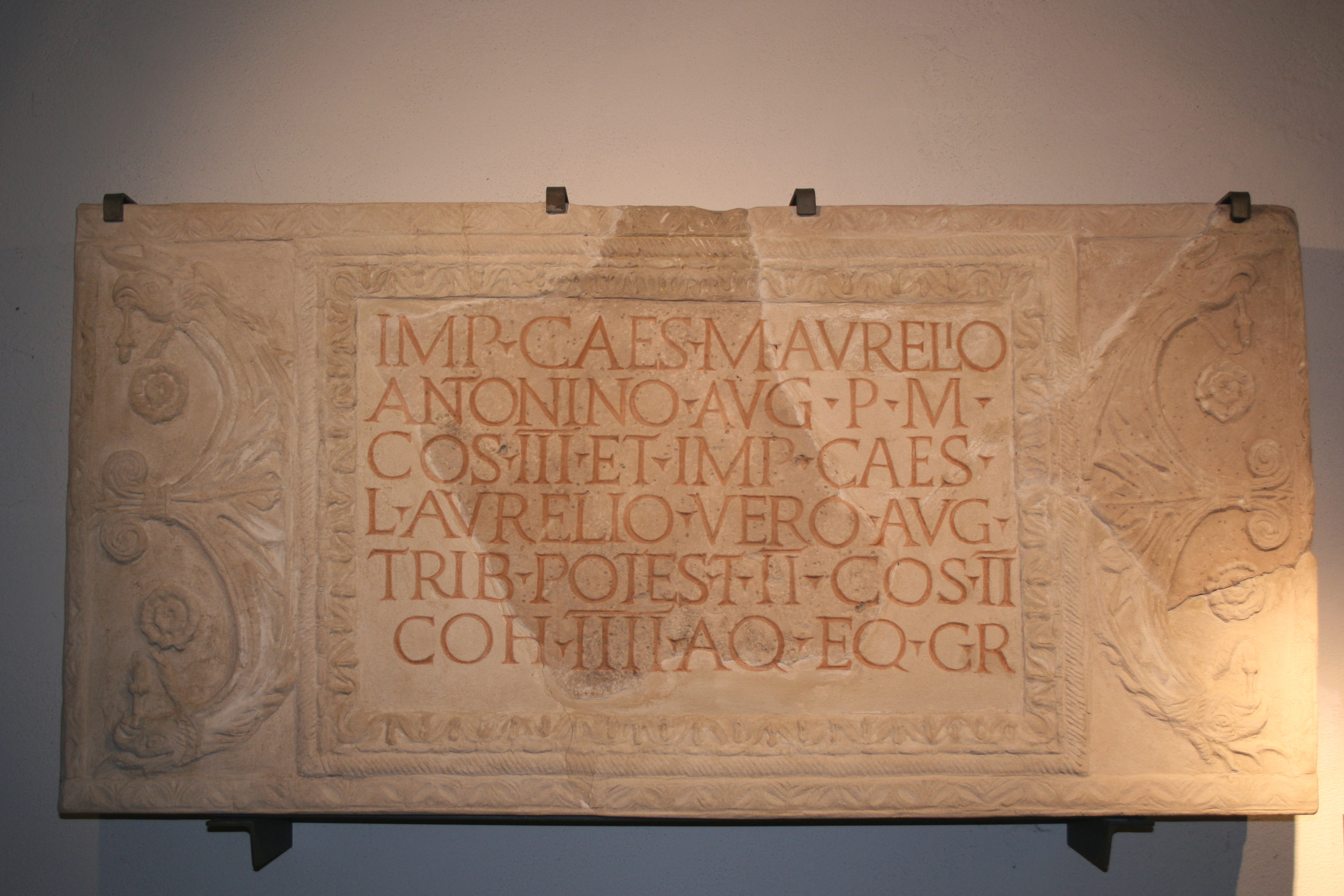
Dedicatory inscription from the cross hall of the Principia at Obernburg Roman Camp, today in the Obernburg Roman Museum

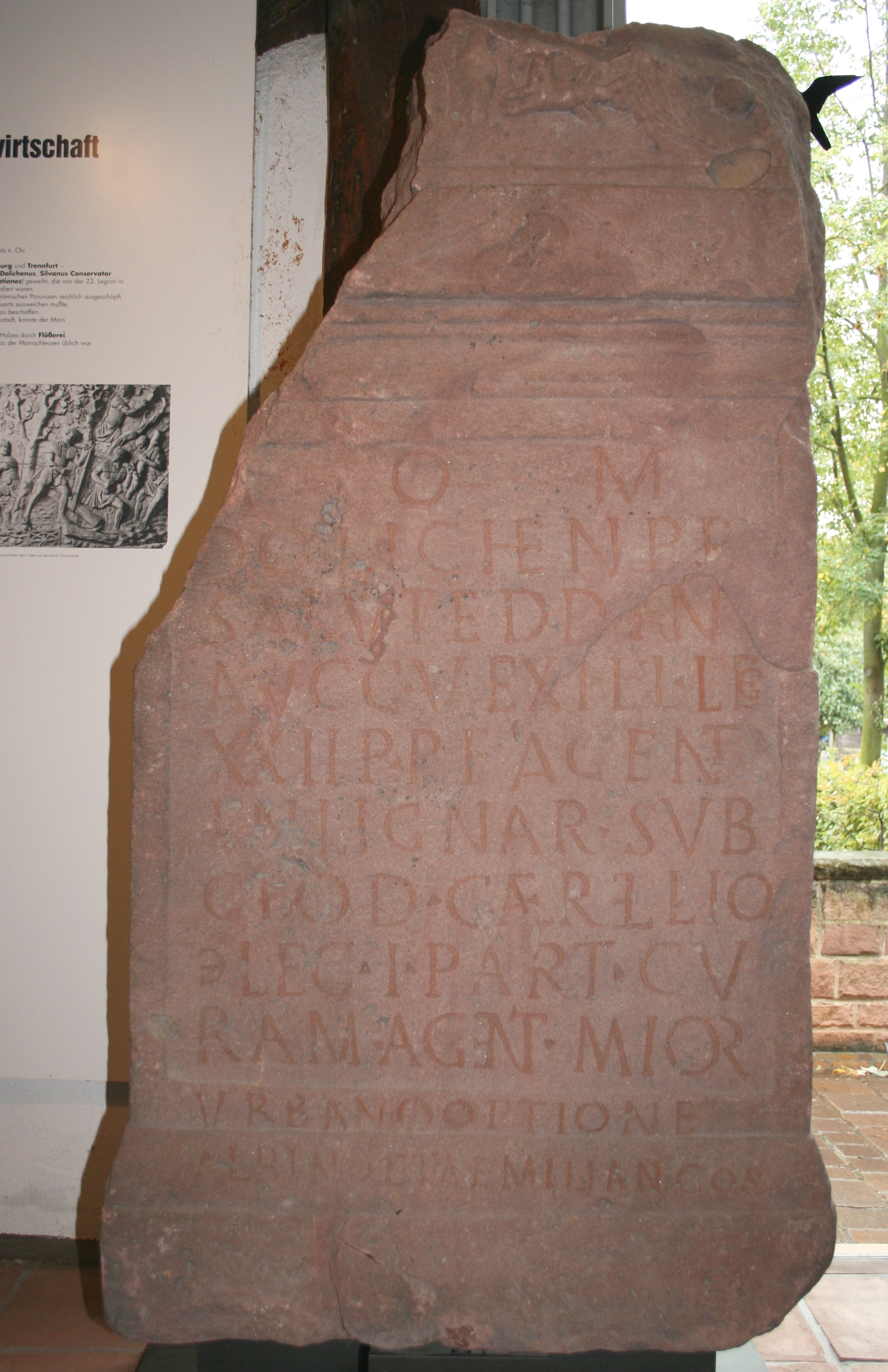
Inscription, in which a logging troop of the Legio XXII Primigenia is mentioned (Obernburg Museum)

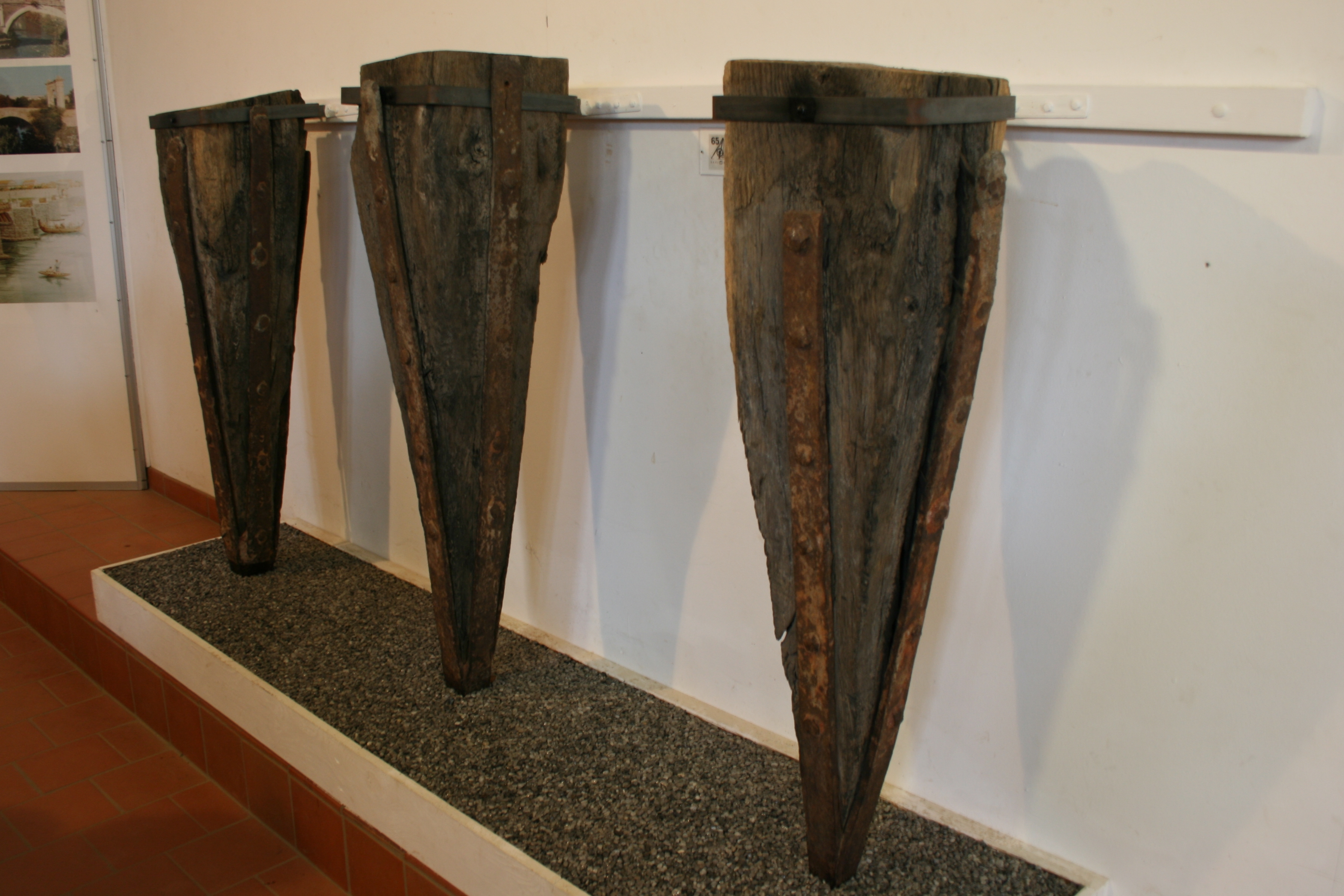
Post sockets of the Main bridge in Großkrotzenburg (Saalburg Museum)

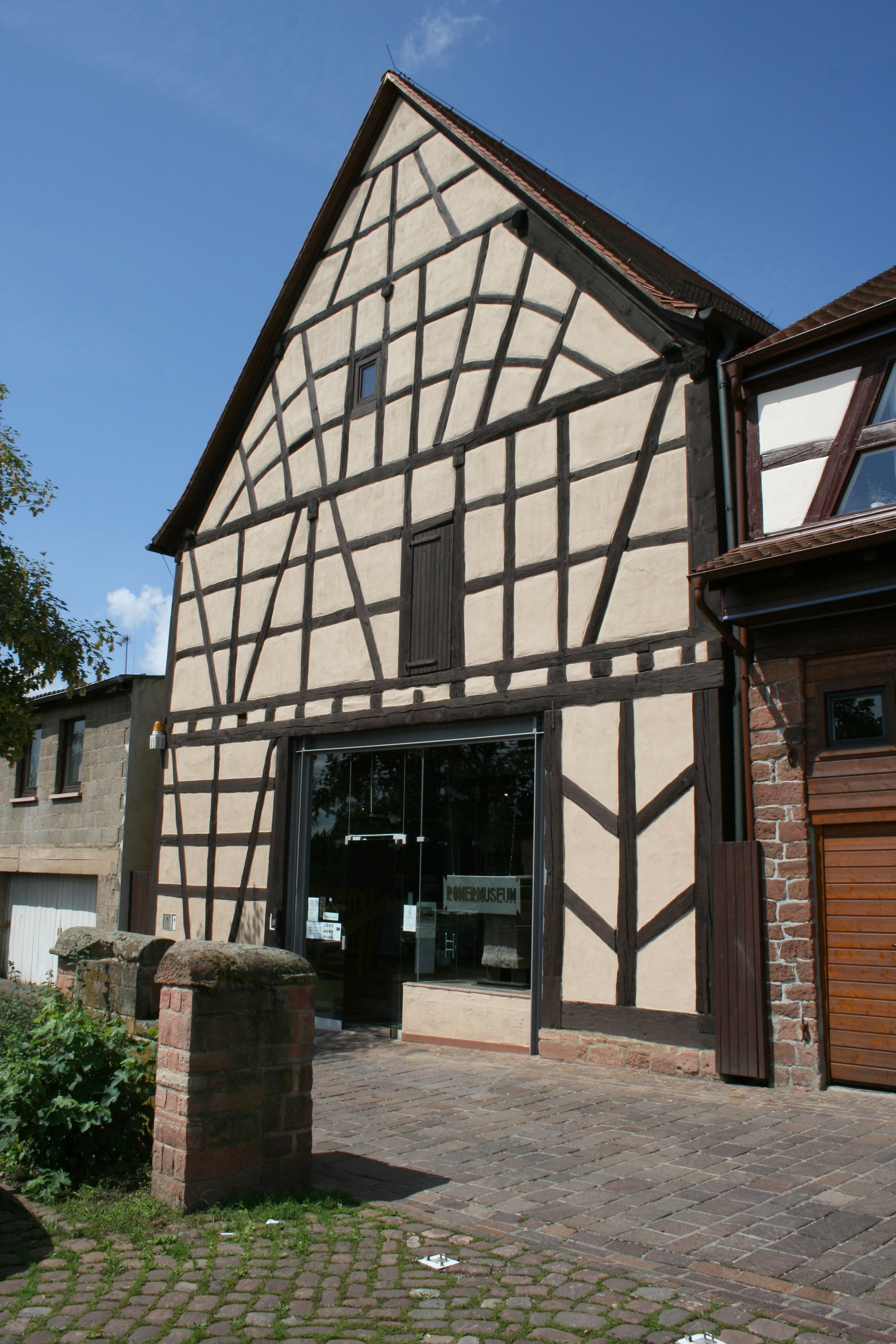
Obernburg Roman Museum

== Literature ==
- Dietwulf Baatz, Fritz-Rudolf Herrmann (eds.): Die Römer in Hessen. Lizenzausgabe der 3rd edition, 1989, Nikol, Hamburg, 2002, ISBN 3-933203-58-9.
- Bernhard Beckmann: Neuere Untersuchungen zum römischen Limeskastell Miltenberg-Altstadt. Verlag Michael Lassleben. Kallmünz, 2004, ISBN 3-7847-5085-0.
- Bernd Steidl: Welterbe Limes – Roms Grenze am Main. Begleitband zur Ausstellung in der Archäologischen Staatssammlung Munich, 2008. Logo, Obernburg, 2008, ISBN 3-939462-06-3.
- Kurt Stade: Die Mainlinie von Seligenstadt bis Miltenberg mit einem Nachtrage zur Abt. B Nr. 33 Kastell Stockstadt. In: Ernst Fabricius, Felix Hettner, Oscar von Sarwey (eds.): Der obergermanisch-raetische Limes des Roemerreiches. (ORL) Abt. A, Strecke 6 (1933), pp. 3–70.
- Britta Rabold, Egon Schallmayer, Andreas Thiel: Der Limes. Die Deutsche Limes-Straße vom Rhein bis zur Donau. Verein Deutsche Limes-Straße, K. Theiss Verlag, Stuttgart, 2000, ISBN 3-8062-1461-1.
