= Halheim Fort =

Roman fort

The Halheim Fort is a Roman border fort close to the Rhaetian Limes, a UNESCO World Heritage Site since 2005. The former numerus fort is located near Pfahlheim/Halheim, a district of Ellwangen in the Ostalbkreis district of Baden-Württemberg.

== Location ==
Celtic tribes settled in the Halheim area in pre-Roman times, leaving remains of a Latène period settlement, primarily ceramics, in the "Berg" field. The 80 × 82.5 meter fort was built on a slight hill south of the Sonnenbach stream in the agricultural field known as "Buschelacker", 35 meters southeast of the Raetian Wall, which crosses the district from southwest to northeast. The village of Halheim lies one kilometer southwest of the fort.

== Research history ==
As the field name "Buschelacker" ("Buschel" = southern German for castle ruins) suggests, knowledge of an ancient fortification persisted locally. Finds from the fort area have been documented since the early 19th century. In 1819, judicial secretary Maximilian Buzorini and grammar school professor Johann Georg Freudenreich described the site. In 1884, local historians Karl Kurtz (1817–1887) and district administrator Hugo Steinhardt excavated several areas of the fort and its camp village. In 1891, theologian, natural scientist, and cartography historian Konrad Miller, alongside Kurtz, surveyed the fort for inclusion in the cadastral map. In 1894, Major Heinrich Steimle conducted excavations for the Reichs-Limeskommission (RLK), focusing on the ramparts and fort dimensions. No further excavations occurred until geophysical investigations began in October 2010 and concluded in February 2011, led by geophysicist Harald von der Osten.

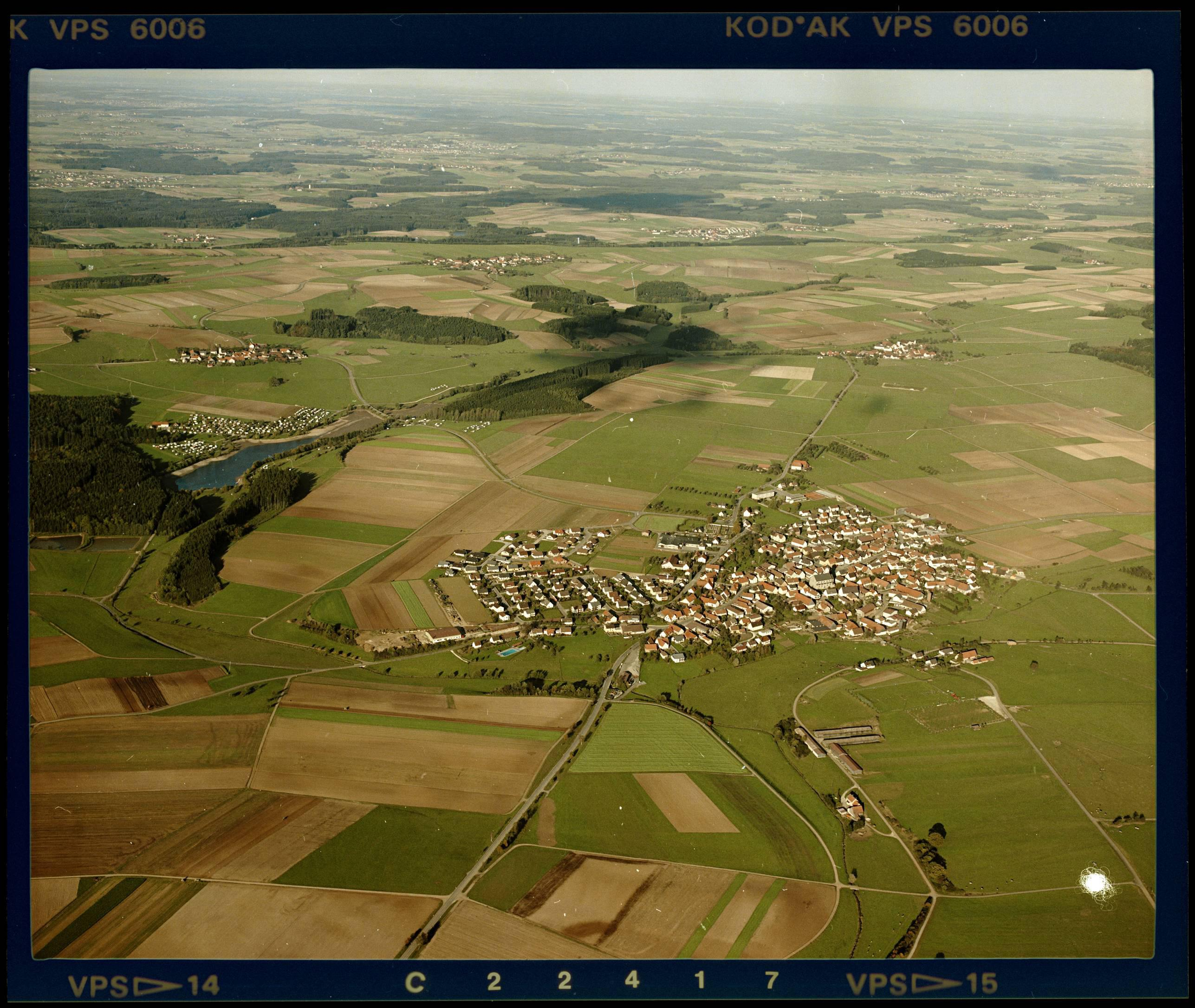
Aerial view of Pfahlheim, with Halheim in the center right, above the overgrown square of the bush hedge bordering the fort

The fort and the southwestern section of the Limes up to Aalen Fort

== Construction history ==
The fort and its immediate surroundings, based on RLK findings

An unknown unit of 100 to 200 men, possibly a larger unit, likely built the fort between 125 and 205 AD, during the Raetian Limes' construction. Dendrochronological data from the Dambach Fort indicates the Limes' stone wall used wood felled in winter 206/207 AD. However, the Limes' arc around Halheim suggests a possible earlier founding, potentially around or before 160 AD, when the wooden Limes palisade began. Dendrochronological samples from western Schwabsberg date to 165 AD, and those from eastern Mönchsroth to 160 AD.

The fort's 1.2-meter-wide defensive wall, forming an almost square 80 × 82.5 meter structure, features four rounded corners (playing card shape), each with a watchtower. It includes two single-lane gates: the Porta praetoria in the north, facing the enemy, and the Porta decumana in the south, each flanked by two gate towers. An intermediate tower stands at the center of each flank. Inside, an earth ramp behind the wall allowed soldier patrols, and a 6.5-meter-wide spike ditch served as an approach obstacle.

In 1819, Buzorini and Freudenreich noted Roman ruins spanning an area half an hour wide and long, with the fort wall averaging four feet in height. They found column fragments on the east side and numerous wall remains inside the garrison, along with frequent coin discoveries. The 1894 excavation did not reveal the fort's interior but likely followed a standard Roman plan adapted to local conditions and troop strength.

The numerus stationed at Halheim guarded a section of the Limes until the fall of the Limes in 260 AD, under the command of the Ala II Flavia milliaria p.f. from Aalen Fort. The circumstances of its abandonment remain unclear.

== Troop ==
The unit at Halheim, an unnamed numerus, was part of the Roman auxiliary troops, less standardized than the auxilia. Established during the Limes' early development, numeri met the need for smaller, cost-effective border units. Recruited locally with lower pay and less strict standards, they likely did not receive Roman citizenship upon discharge, unlike auxilia. The Halheim soldiers may have used bows, as suggested by a weapons cache found in 1884.

== Vicus and fort baths ==
South of the fort, in the Hornfeld field, walls likely connected to the fort's vicus were discovered, along with additional finds. The fort's baths may lie west of the numerus fort, indicated by a concentration of stones.

== Finds ==
A hollow-cast Roman bronze hand, approximately 15.5 cm high and 8.5 cm wide, was found in the vicus by unauthorized metal detectorists. Holding a tubular container between the index finger and thumb, it was severed at mid-hand, bent open, and missing the ring and little fingers, with a saw mark on the thumb. Possibly a candle holder, it is now housed in the Archaeological State Museum (ALM) in Rastatt.

== Listing ==
The Halheim Fort and associated archaeological monuments have been part of the UNESCO World Heritage Site of the Upper Germanic-Rhaetian Limes since 2005. They are also cultural monuments under Baden-Württemberg's Monument Protection Act (DSchG).

== See also ==
- List of forts on the Upper Germanic-Raetian Limes
