= Wetterau Limes =

National heritage site

Coordinates: 50°29′59″N 8°41′57″E

The Wetterau Limes is the name given in the field of historical research to that part of the Upper Germanic-Rhaetian Limes which enclosed the region that became known later as the Wetterau in the German state of Hesse.

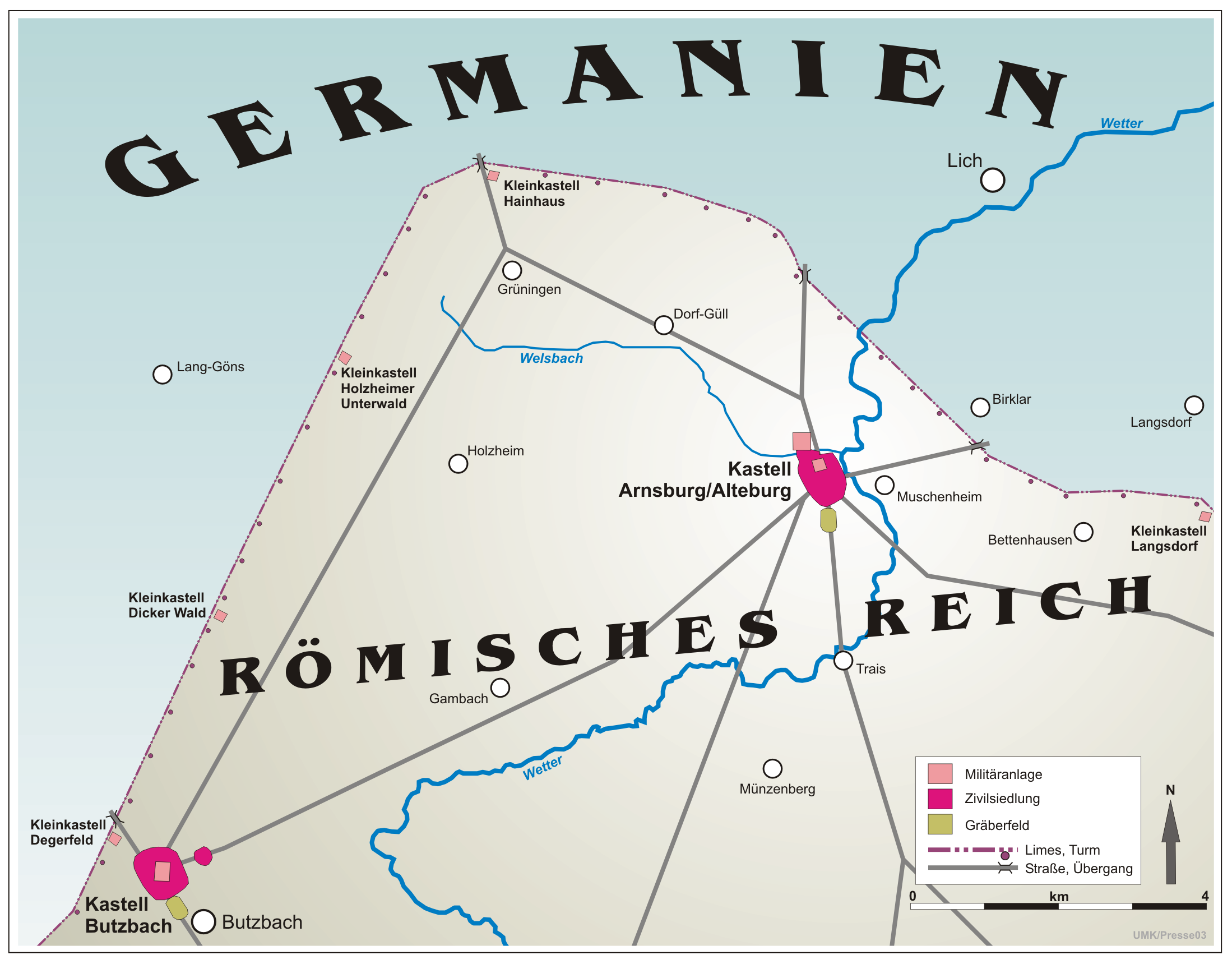
Course of the limes in the Wetterau

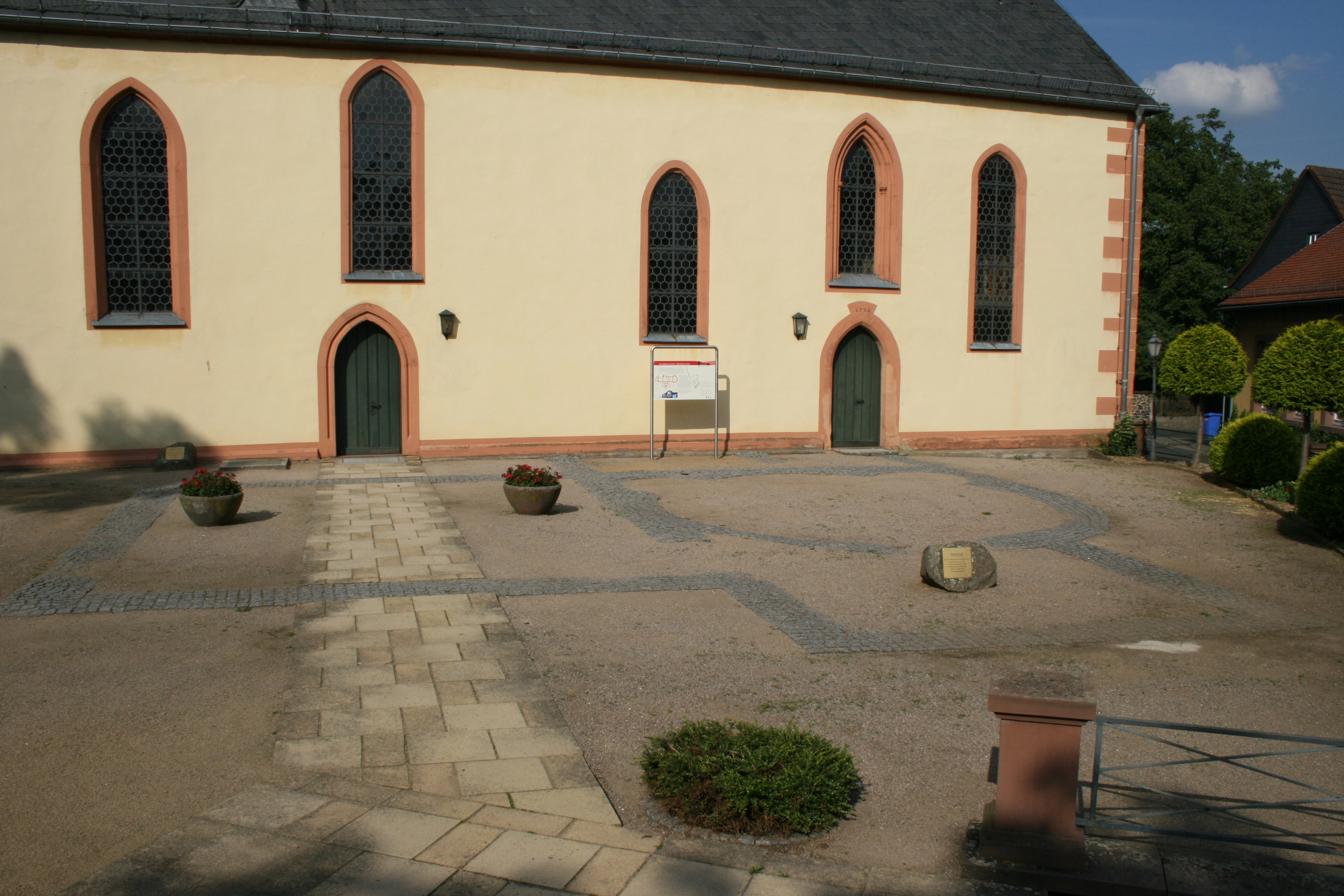
Bathhouse of Echzell Roman Fort in the paving in front of the church.

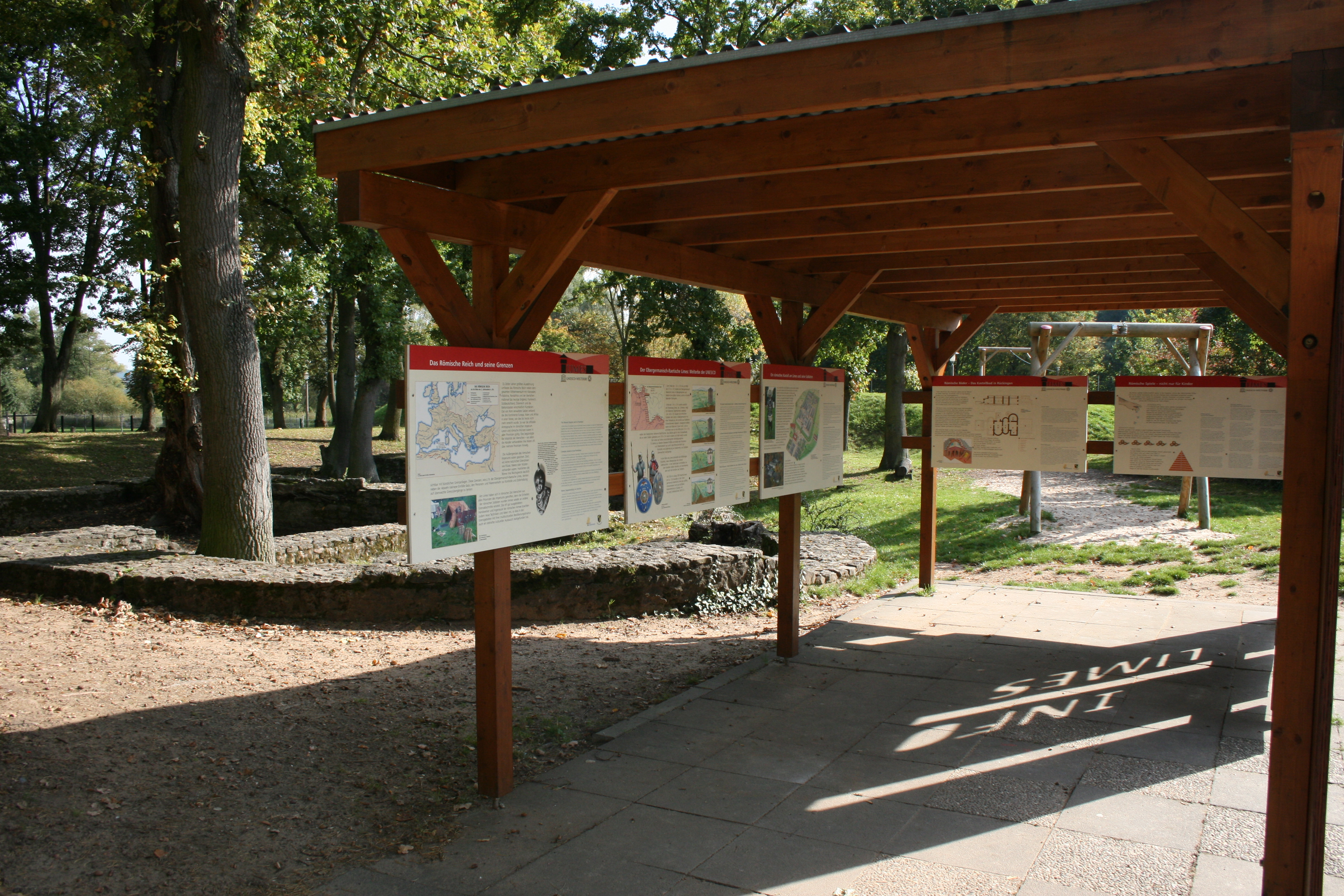
Information board in front of the bathhouse of Rückingen Roman Fort.

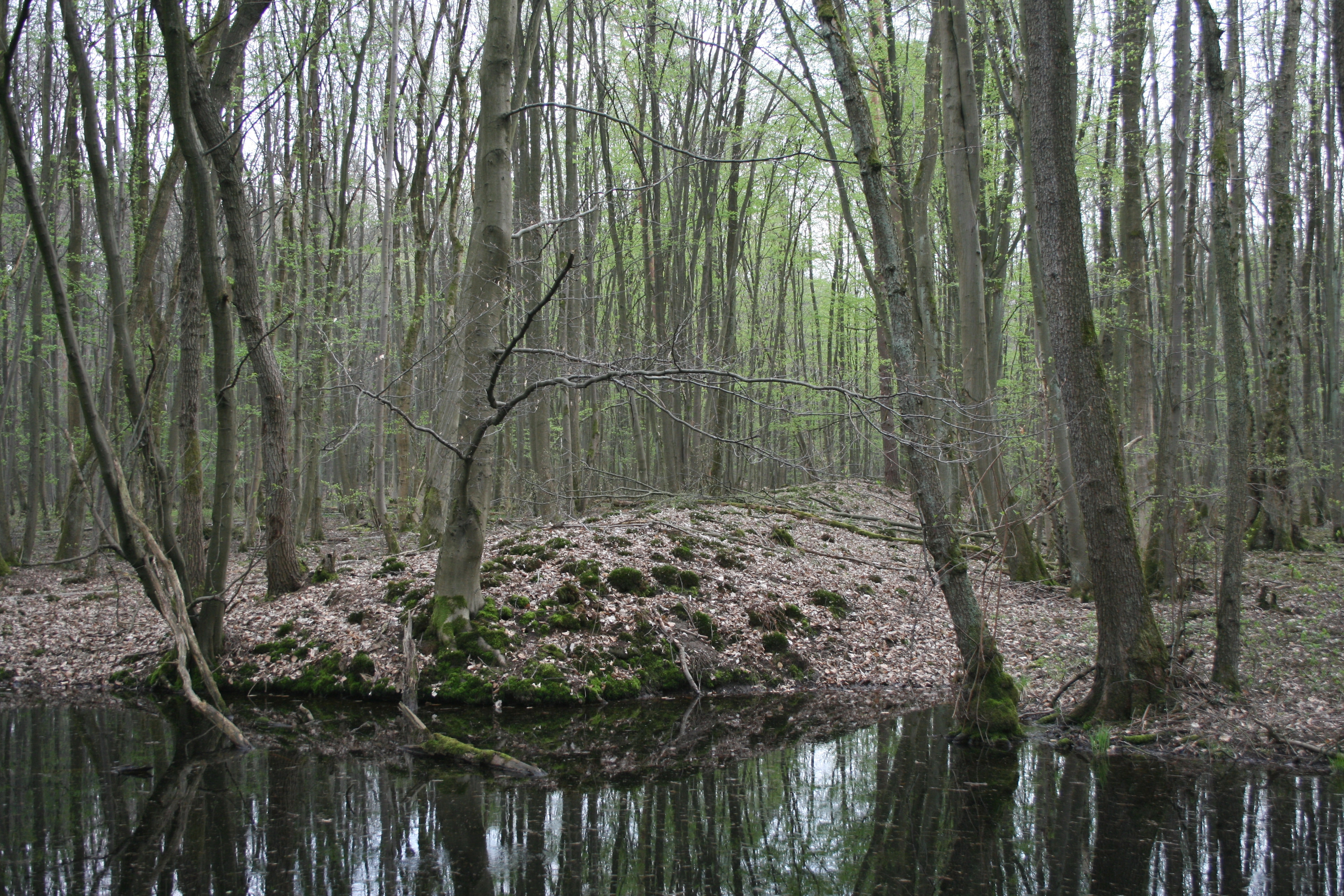
Well-preserved section of the limes in the Bulau near Erlensee.

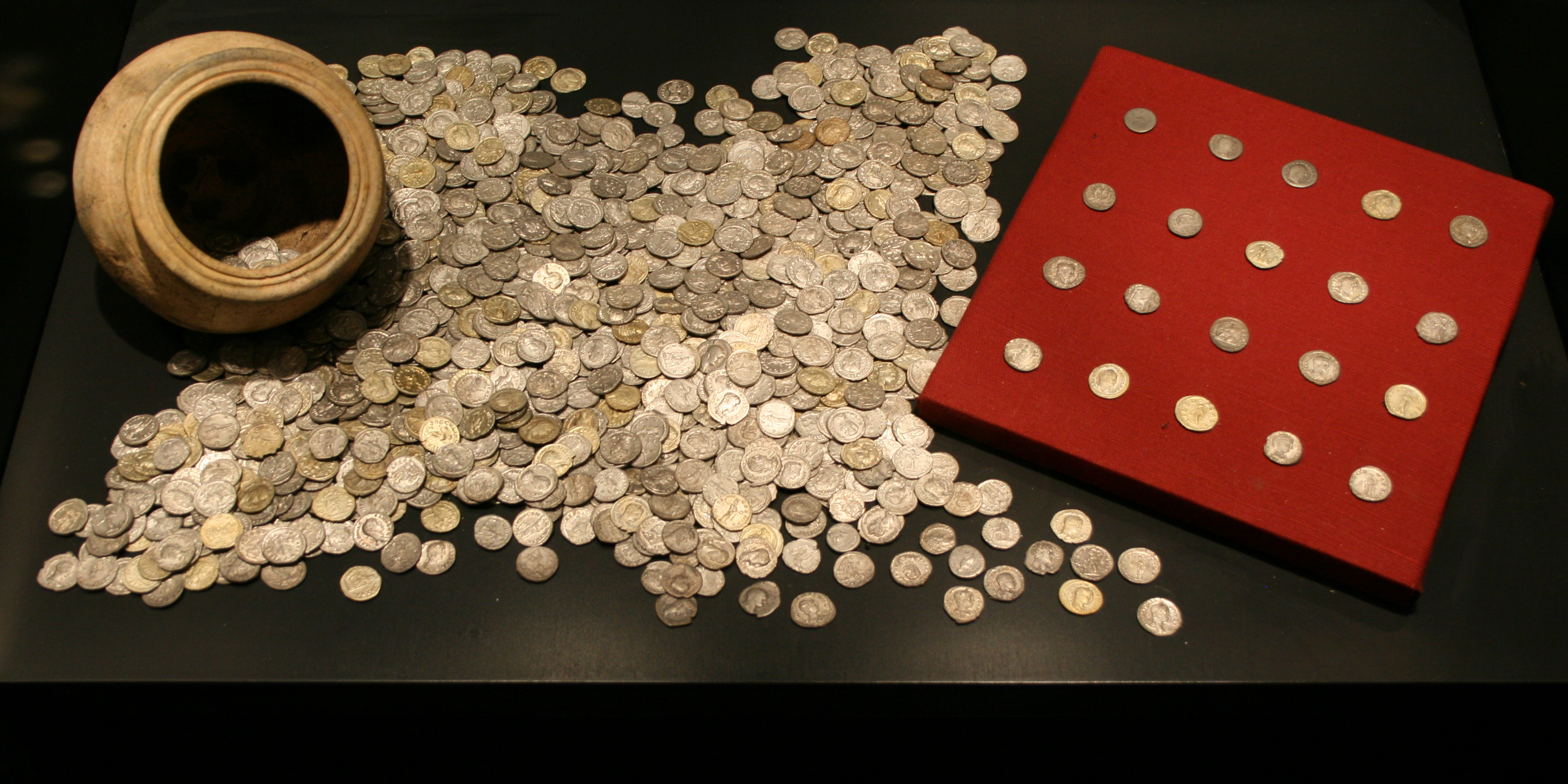
The treasure of Ober-Florstadt in the Wetterau Museum.

== History and route ==
During the two campaigns of the Roman Emperor Domitian against the Chatti (83 and 85 AD), the Romans began to cut swathes of open ground through the dense forests of today's Hesse, in order to prevent their columns from being ambushed (e.g. at the Battle of the Teutoburg Forest).

On the crest of the Taunus mountain range, such a swathe served as a supply and surveillance route. After the end of the Chatti Wars, the Romans began to secure these conquered regions east of the Rhine with a limes - a line of forts, fortlets, watchtowers and palisades. The forest road was guarded by wooden watchtowers to ensure continuous observation. This ensured that the southern slopes of the Taunus mountains and the fertile and strategically important Wetterau became part of the Roman Empire. In addition to the establishment of this frontier, Domitian turned the two Germanic military territories of Upper and Lower Germania into Roman provinces. In spite of this rather modest conquest, he was subsequently celebrated in Rome with great pomp as a triumphator and coins were minted with the ambitious claim Germania capta ("Germania is conquered"). The propaganda nature of this policy is also evinced by the fact that in the very narrow province of Upper Germania (Germania superior) there were hardly any Germani, the area was populated almost entirely by Celts.

The long-held conviction that the Neckar-Odenwald Limes was erected at the same time as the Wetterau Limes, immediately after the Chatti wars, is now regarded as having been rejected. Although there were Roman military outposts on the eastern side of the Rhine from the seventies, the border running along the Odenwald-Neckar Line to Donnstetten (see Lautertal Limes) is now dated by most sources as having not been erected before 98 AD.

The state of preservation of the limes is poor due to the heavy agricultural use of the Wetterau. Only a few sections on the foothills of the Taunus, at Echzell, Limeshain and east of Hanau are visible above ground. In the early days of limes research, this situation meant that the eastern Wetterau section remained undiscovered; it was assumed that a stretch of the limes ran through the Vogelsberg instead. This was not disproved until the 1880s by excavations of the Hanauer Geschichtsverein under Albert Duncker and Georg Wolff.

Like the other sections of the Upper German-Raetian Limes, the Wetterau Limes was gradually reinforced and expanded. Particularly in the eastern Wetterau the dates when the individual forts were first built are not uniform. It is clear that there was initially a defensive line from Oberflorstadt via Heldenbergen and Hanau-Mittelbuchen to Hanau-Salisberg The forts on the line further east from Marköbel via Rückingen to Großkrotzenburg were probably not built until the time of Trajan. The neighbouring Taunus line was reinforced in the second half of the second century by the numerus forts of Holzhausen, Kleiner Feldberg and Kapersburg.

The further expansion of the limes defences to the north of the Wetterau was in order to protect its fertile soils on the one hand and to meet the high demand for the supply of the troops stationed on the limes and legion camps in Mainz (Mogontiacum). Archaeobotanical studies have calculated that an annual requirement of 3,034 tons of grain (excluding seed production) and 10,371 tons of hay were required to supply for the north-facing bulge of the limes in the Wetterau.

The end of the Wetterau Limes came in the year 259-260 AD, when Rome abandoned all areas to the east of the Rhine (the Limesfall or "fall of the limes"). Thus, for example, the pottery trade, once flourishing in the Wetterau, largely came to a standstill. Imports of pottery from the Rhineland dominate archaeological collections from the second third of the 3rd century. Even bricks found in the area do not seem to have been fired as they used to be. More and more often, (sometimes damaged) older building material was used instead. Hypocaust heating was replaced by much simpler heating pipe systems. From the border area, however, there are also other interesting finds which shed further light on the later period of the limes. This includes the treasure of Ober-Florstadt, which was probably concealed during the course of Germanic invasions in AD 233. In 1603, the inscription of a collegium iuventutis was discovered in the area around Altenstadt Roman Fort. This may have been a unit set up to act as a local militia. Kapersburg Roman Fort was considerably reduced during its last days. There is also evidence of a local unit, a numberus nidensium, which was presumably raised in the civitas capital of Nida-Heddernheim.

== Roman forts on the Wetterau Limes ==
- Lochmühle Fortlet
- Kapersburg Roman Fort
- Ockstädter Wald Fortlet
- Kaisergrube Fortlet
- Am Eichkopf Fortlet
- Langenhain Roman Fort
- Hunnenkirchhof Fortlet
- Butzbach Roman Fort
- Degerfeld Fortlet
- Dicker Wald Fortlet
- Holzheimer Unterwald Fortlet
- Hainhaus Fortlet
- Arnsburg Roman Fort
- Langsdorf Fortlet
- Feldheimer Wald Fortlet
- Inheiden Roman Fort
- Auf dem Wingertsberg Fortlet
- Massohl Fortlet
- Auf der Burg Fortlet
- Haselheck Fortlet
- Echzell Roman Fort
- Lochberg Fortlet
- Staden Fortlet
- Ober-Florstadt Roman Fort
- Stammheim Fortlet
- Altenstadt Roman Fort
- Auf dem Buchkopf Fortlet
- Marköbel Roman Fort
- Langendiebach Fortlet
- Rückingen Roman Fort
- (Hanau-Salisberg Roman Fort)
- Neuwirtshaus Fortlet
- Großkrotzenburg Roman Fort

== Museums ==
The following museums have a permanent exhibition on the Wetterau Limes or individual sites along it:

- Saalburg Museum, Bad Homburg
- Wetterau Museum, Friedberg
- Butzbach Municipal Museum
- Limes Information Centre at Hof Graß
- Echzell Local History Museum
- Heuson Museum, Büdingen
- Erlensee-Rückingen Local History Museum
- Schloss Steinheim Museum
- Großkrotzenburg Museum

== Literature ==
- Dietwulf Baatz and Fritz-Rudolf Herrmann (eds.): Die Römer in Hesse. Licensed issue of the 3rd edition of 1989. Nikol, Hamburg, 2002, ISBN 3-933203-58-9.
- Marion Mattern: Römische Steindenkmäler vom Taunus- und Wetteraulimes mit Hinterland zwischen Heftrich und Großkrotzenburg. Habelt, Bonn, 2001, ISBN 3-88467-056-5, (Corpus signorum Imperii Romani, Germany, 2,12)
- Barbara Oldenstein-Pferdehirt: Die römischen Hilfstruppen nördlich des Mains. Forschungen zum Obergermanischen Heer I. In: yearbook of the Römisch-Germanisches Zentralmuseum 30, 1983, pp. 303–348.
- Vera Rupp, Heide Birley: Wanderungen am Wetteraulimes. Archäologische Wanderungen am Limes vom Köpperner Tal im Taunus bis zur Drususeiche bei Limeshain. Theiss, Stuttgart, 2005, ISBN 3-8062-1551-0, (Guide to Hessian Pre- and Early History, 6)
