= Trennfurt Roman Fort =

Archaeological site in Bavaria, Germany

Trennfurt Roman Fort Kastell Trennfurt
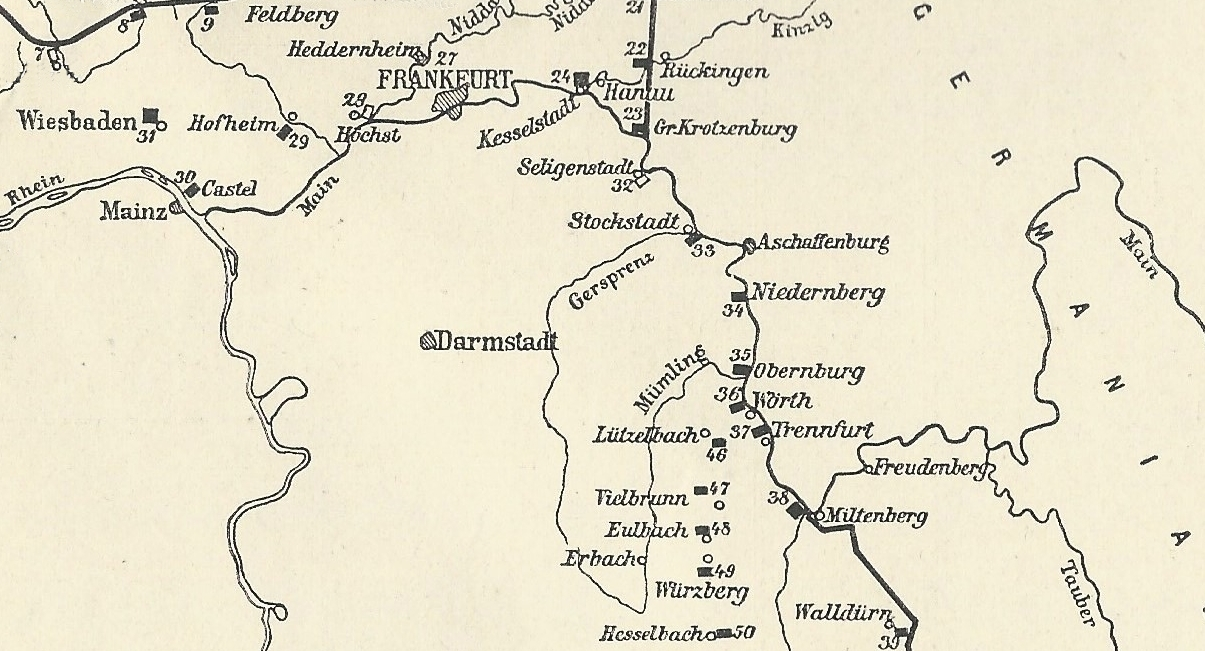
- Trennfurt in the row of the limes forts at the Main
- Limes: ORL 37 (RLK)
- Section (RLK): Upper Germanic-Rhaetian Limes, Section 6
- Size: (88 × 63 (= 0,6 ha)
- Coordinates: 49.77789°N 9.17803°E
- Previous fort: Wörth Roman Fort
- Following fort: Miltenberg-Altstadt Roman Fort

The Trennfurt Roman Fort (German: Kastell Trennfurt) is a castrum in the village of Trennfurt (now part of Klingenberg am Main) at the river Main in Bavaria. It belongs to the Main Limes as a part of the Unesco world heritage site Upper Germanic-Rhaetian Limes (German: Obergermanisch-Raetischer Limes or ORL) and has the number ORL 37.

== Location ==
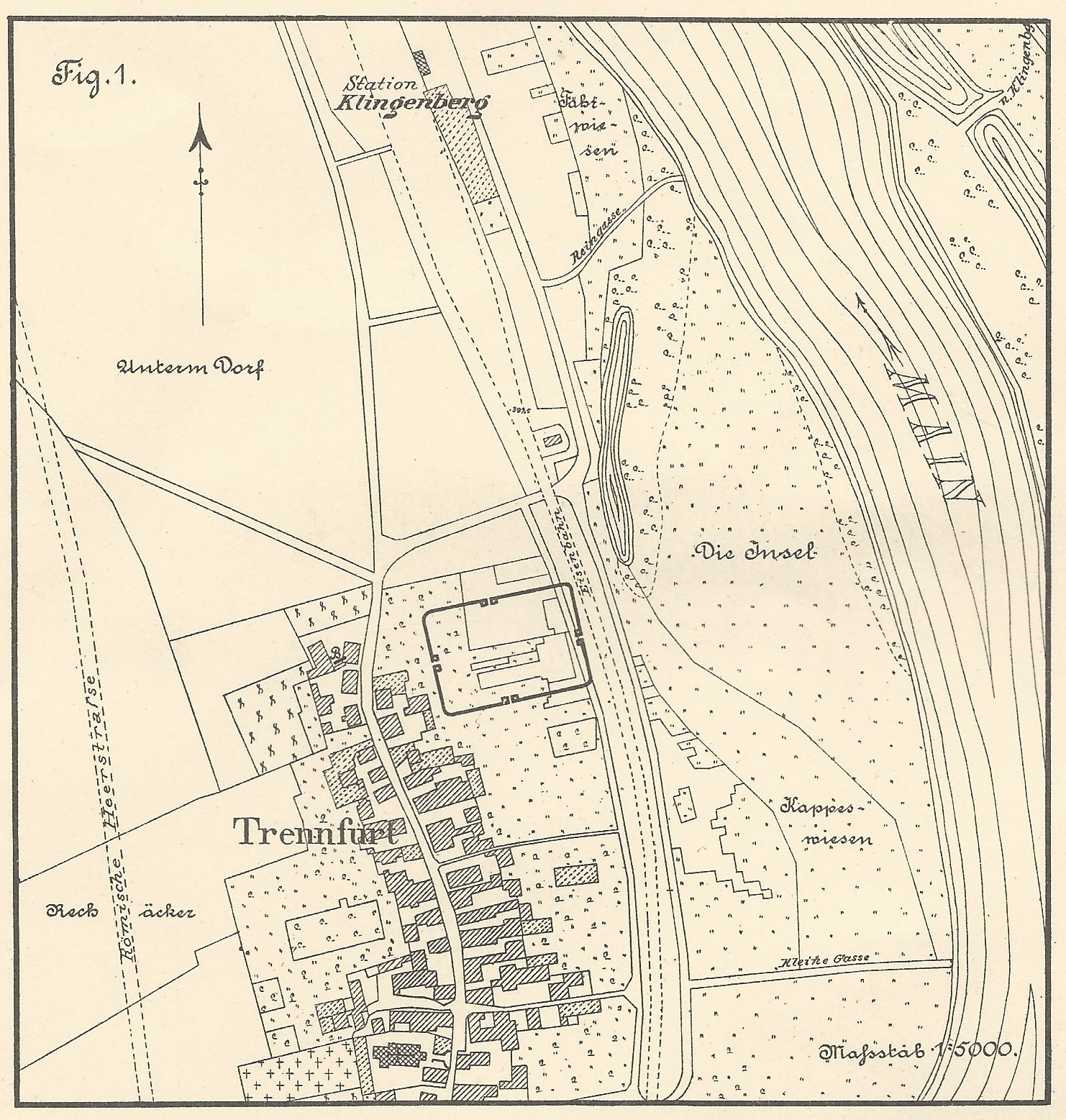
Location of the fort in Trennfurt

The castrum is situated shortly north east of the old centre of the village Trennfurt. Visible terrain marks of the castrum do not exist at the site which mostly consists of garden land in private property. There are no buildings on the ground. But a small part of the north eastern edge of the castrum was built over by the railway in the 1870s.

== Research ==
Wilhelm Conrady, later section commissioner of the Imperial Limes Commission (Reichslimeskommission, RLK), discovered the castrum in 1883 when he made excavations there. There have not been any further excavations since then. According to Conrady the castrum is made of stone, has a size of about 88 x 63 metres and a surface of about 0,6 hectares. This is the normal size of a castrum for a numerus.

It is unknown when the castrum was erected and how long it was occupied. It only can be dated from the 2nd to 3rd century AD.

Conrady examined a Roman votive stone, which was found in Trennfurt in the 18th century and which is walled in now inside the parish church of the village. He deciphered the inscription as "I(ovi) o(ptimo) m(aximo), Silvano cons(ervatori) Dianae Aug(ustae) vixill(atio) leg(ionis) XXII Anton (initianae) p(rimigeniae) p(iae) f(idelis) ag(entium) in lignari(i)s sub cur(a) Mamertini Iusti opt(ionis) d(edicavit) (duobus) Aspr(is) co(n)s(ulibus)". In English: "Consecrated to Jupiter, the best and greatest, to Silvanus the sustainer and to Diana the venerable by the special unit of the XXIIth legion Primigenia pia fidelis Antoniana, working in the forests under the command of Mamertinius Justus, when the two Aspers were consuls." The two Aspers were consuls in the year 212 AD.

So it is supposed that the castrum was near the place where the Roman soldiers prepared the wood for the transport on the Main, especially because an old branch of the river was only about 40 metres away from the eastern side of the fort. At the time of Conrady the branch already had vanished, but its traces still could be seen on the ground.

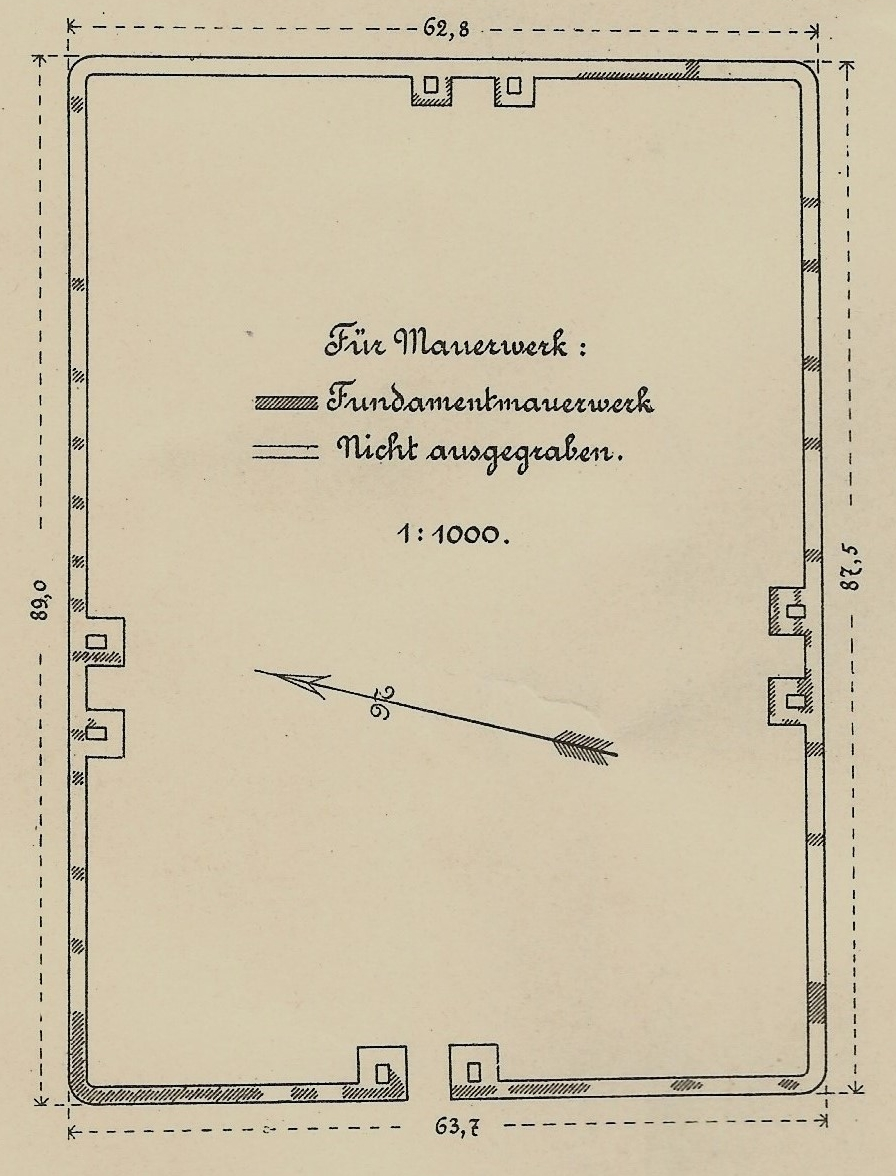
Plan of the Roman fort in Trennfurt

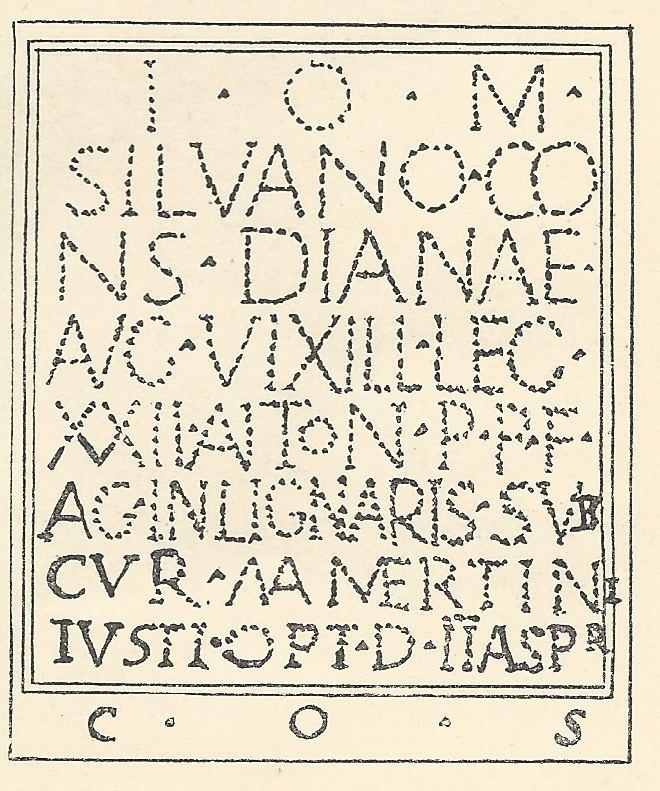
Inscription on the Roman votive stone of Trennfurt

The castrum is protected as an archeological monument by Bavarian law. It has the monument number D-6-6221-0050.
