= Wörth am Main =

- Town
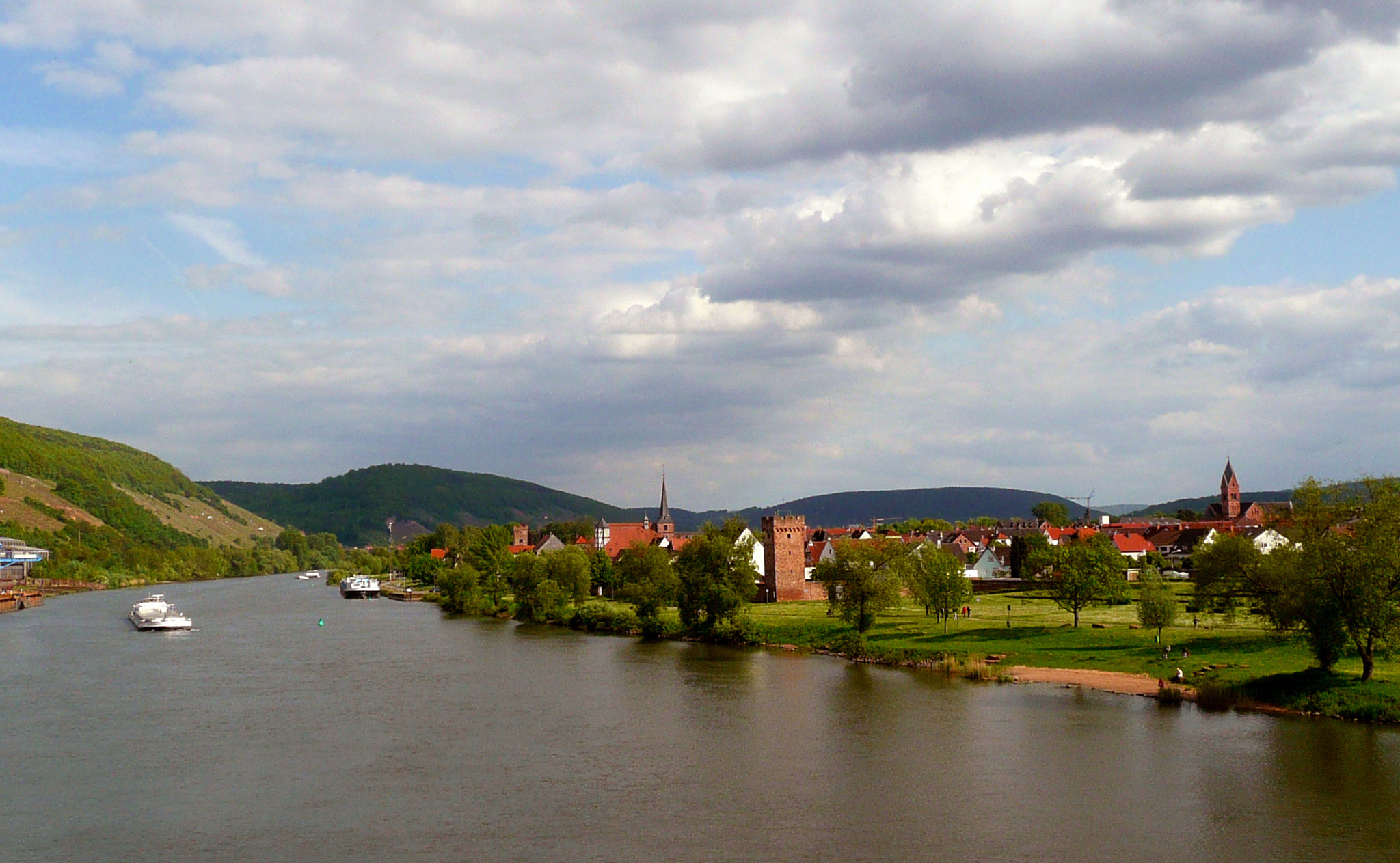
- View from the bridge to Erlenbach

- Flag Coat of arms

- Location of Wörth am Main within Miltenberg district
- Interactive map of Wörth am Main
- Location within Germany Location within Bavaria
- Coordinates: 49°47′47″N 9°9′27″E
- Country: Germany
- State: Bavaria
- Admin. region: Unterfranken
- District: Miltenberg

Government
  - Mayor (2020–26): Andreas Fath (FW)

Area
  - Total: 15.88 km^{2} (6.13 sq mi)
- Elevation: 126 m (413 ft)

Population (2025-12-31)
  - Total: 4,748
  - Density: 299.0/km^{2} (774.4/sq mi)
- Time zone: UTC+01:00 (CET)
  - Summer (DST): UTC+02:00 (CEST)
- Postal codes: 63939
- Dialling codes: 09372
- Vehicle registration: MIL
- Website: www.woerth-am-main.de

Wörth am Main (German pronunciation: [ˈvœʁt ʔam ˈmaɪn], lit. 'Wörth on the Main'; officially Wörth a.Main) is a town in the Miltenberg district in the Regierungsbezirk of Lower Franconia (Unterfranken) in Bavaria, Germany. It has a population of around 4,700.

== Geography ==
=== Location ===
Wörth am Main lies on the left bank of the Main, nestled between the hills of the Odenwald and Spessart, 13 kilometres (8 miles) northwest of Miltenberg, and 19 kilometres (12 miles) south of Aschaffenburg.

Wörth lies in the Bavarian section of the Naturpark Bergstraße-Odenwald.

== History ==
It is believed that Roman soldiers built a simple earthen-wooden castrum in Wörth as early as Roman Emperor Domitian’s time (AD 81–96), and later a massive stone castrum.

In Frankish times, beginning in the 6th century, Wörth was a centre of royal power and with Saint Martin’s Chapel, in today’s graveyard, it was a jumping-off point for Christian missionary work in the Odenwald.

The town was refounded on its current site in the latter half of the 13th century by the Lords of Breuberg under the overlordship of the Archbishops of Mainz. In 1291, it had its first documentary mention as the town of Werde (“Island”). An important political change was the town's cession to the Kingdom of Bavaria in 1816.

Wörth has long been a site of ship and boat building. Inland navigation also was an important source of local income. From 1652 until 1918 up to three ship yards built wooden river boats and ships here. The last remaining yard eventually moved to Erlenbach across the river, where it still operates.

== Arts and culture ==
The old town is characterized by the mediaeval town fortifications and many historic monuments and timber-frame houses. From the former Electoral Mainz castle, the tower with its Renaissance portal is still preserved (today used by businesses).

Wörth lies on the Deutsche Limesstraße ("German Limes Road"). In Wörth is found the archaeological monument that was once a Roman castrum (specifically, a numerus castrum) at a spot where the older border, the Neckar-Odenwald Limes, met the Limes Germanicus following the Main river.

Wörth town forest (1000 ha) offers more than 50 kilometres (31 miles) of signposted hiking trails.

=== Museums ===
There are the Schiffahrts- und Schiffbaumuseum Wörth ("Wörth Shipping and Shipbuilding Museum") in the former St. Wolfgang-Kirche (church) and a small branch office at the community centre with information about the Romans in Wörth.

=== Buildings ===
- Bürgerhaus ("community centre", formerly the town hall) with Renaissance portal from 1600
- Wörth Shipping and Shipbuilding Museum in the former St. Wolfgang-Kirche (15th to 18th century). The mostly Baroque building was used as a church until 1903.
- New town with residential buildings made of bunter in numbers unique in Bavaria, 1883–85
- Town centre with town hall (1885, a former school), parish centre, railway station (1876), vocational college (1790, a former parish hall), Wendelinuskapelle (chapel, 1780) and estate (formerly the new town inn)
- St Nikolaus-Kirche, built in Romanesque Revival style from the year 1898, with a cross altar, Crucifixion group and Passion image
- "Gallows" monument, made out of two 7-metre-tall sandstone pillars, 1754
- St Martin-Kapelle in the graveyard, 14th century, originally established, however, in the time when the Lower Main was Christianized
- Schlossturm ("castle tower", today used by businesses), late 13th century
- Upper gate, 15th century
- Tannenturm (tower), 15th century
- Wörth castrum (1st-2nd century) and castrum bath, lying below the mill, only discernible by low humps in the ground

== Transport ==
- Bundesstraße 469 to the Würzburg-Frankfurt Autobahn A 3
- Deutsche Bahn railway network
- Main Federal Waterway

== Governance ==
=== Town twinning ===
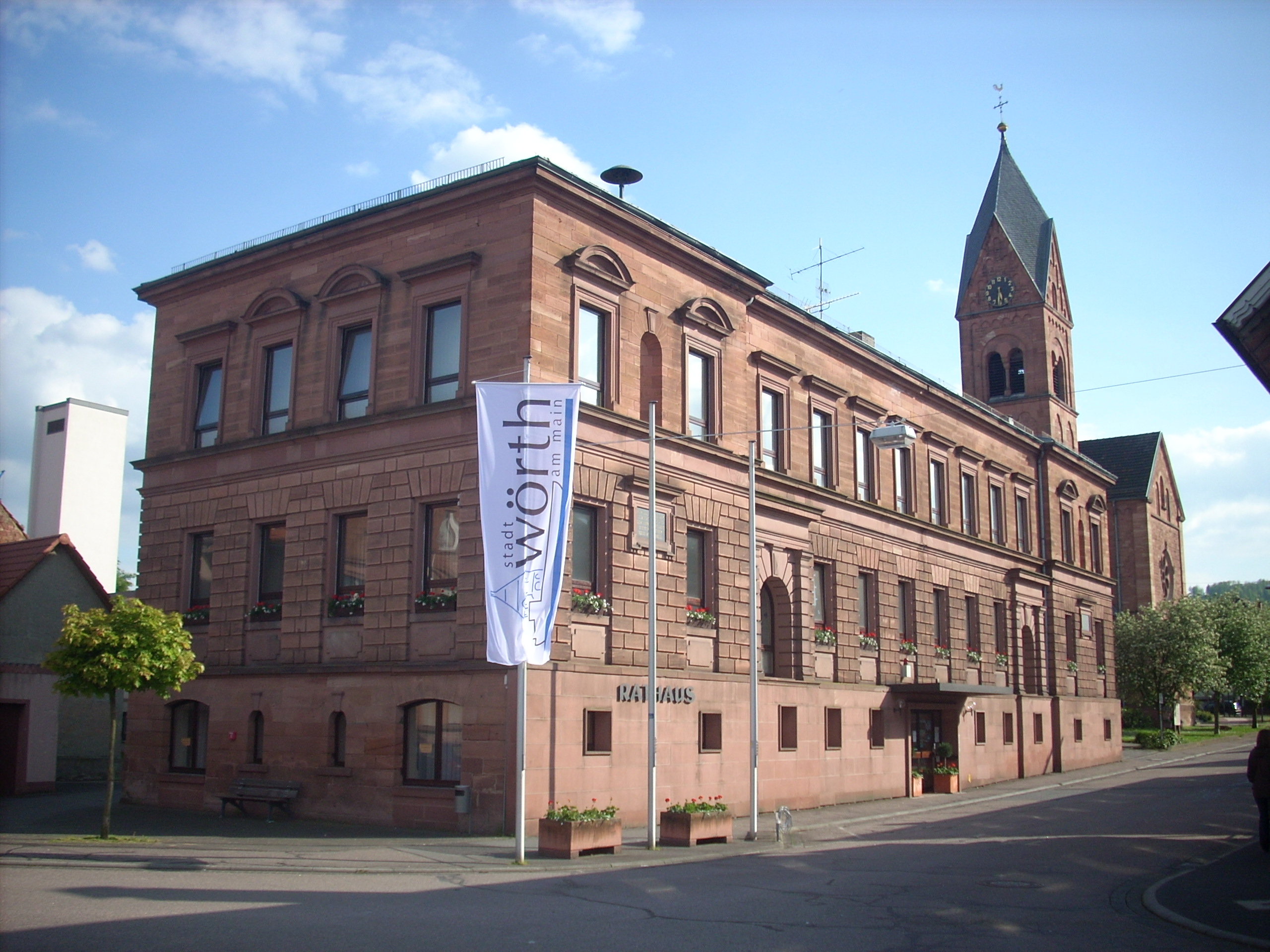
Wörth am Main Town hall

Wörth am Main is twinned with:

- Honfleur, Calvados, France (since 16 June 2006)

=== Mayors ===
In March 2014 Andreas Fath (Freie Wähler - Free voters) was elected the new mayor. He is the successor of Erwin Dotzel (CSU), he was 30 years in office.
