= Neckar-Odenwald Limes =

Early sections of the Upper Germanic-Rhaetian Limes

Map with route of the Odenwald Limes (red line, left) with locations of towers, camps, settlements or well known remains of a villa rustica as well as descriptions of military divisions; right: the line of the so-called Anterior Limes, which replaced the Neckar-Odenwald Limes around 160/165 AD.

The Neckar-Odenwald Limes (German: Neckar-Odenwald-Limes) is a collective term for two, very different early sections of the Upper Germanic-Rhaetian Limes, a Roman defensive frontier line that may have been utilised during slightly different periods in history. The Neckar-Odenwald Limes consists of the northern Odenwald Limes (Odenwaldlimes), a cross-country limes with camps, watchtowers and palisades, which linked the River Main (Latin: Moenus) with the Neckar (Latin: Nicer), and the adjoining southern Neckar Limes (Neckarlimes), which in earlier research was seen as a typical 'riverine limes' (German: Nasser Limes; Latin: limes ripa), whereby the river replaced the function of the palisade as an approach obstacle. More recent research has thrown a different light on this way of viewing things that means may have to be relativized in future. The resulting research is ongoing.

== Route ==
The Odenwald Limes begins in the north on the River Main, either near Obernburg or near Wörth, and runs southwards from there, skilfully using the topographical features of the Odenwald highlands, to the River Neckar, which it probably reached in the area of the present-day county of Heilbronn. The Neckar line forms its extension in a southerly direction as far as Arae Flaviae in the terrain of the present town of Rottweil, where it oriented itself to the course of the river.

== Period ==
The Neckar-Odenwald Limes probably emerged in the area of the Odenwald Limes during the Trajanic period and, in the area of the Neckar line, in the principate of Domitian or early Trajanic period, and, in the area of the old Neckar camps, under Vespasian. It went through several rebuilding phases and did not become obsolete until the construction of the almost perfectly straight Anterior Limes (Vorderer Limes) in the years between 159/161 and 165.

== See also ==
- Hesselbach Roman Fort
- Upper Germanic-Rhaetian Limes

== Literature ==
=== Overviews/General ===
- Egon Schallmayer: Der Odenwaldlimes. Entlang der römischen Grenze zwischen Main und Neckar. Theiss, Stuttgart, 2010, ISBN 978-3-8062-2309-5.
- Dietwulf Baatz: Der Römische Limes. Archäologische Ausflüge zwischen Rhein und Donau. 4th fully revised and expanded edition. Gebr. Mann, Berlin, 2000, ISBN 3-7861-2347-0; esp. pp. 70–73, 179–214 and 343–346.
- Egon Schallmayer: Der Odenwaldlimes. Theiss, Stuttgart, 1984, ISBN 3-8062-0328-8.
- Rainer Türk: Wanderungen am Limes. Brunnengräber, Lorsch, 2008, ISBN 978-3-9811444-1-3.
- Egon Schallmayer: Der Odenwaldlimes. Neueste Forschungsergebnisse, Beiträge zum wissenschaftlichen Kolloquium am 19. März 2010 in Michelstadt, Saalburg-Schriften 8, Römerkastell Saalburg Archäologischer Park, Bad Homburg v. d. H., 2012, ISBN 978-3-931267-07-0

=== Limes sections, individual camps, specialist literature ===
- Géza Alföldy: Caius Popilius Carus Pedo und die Vorverlegung des obergermanischen Limes. In: Fundberichte aus Baden-Württemberg 8. 1983, pp. 55–67,

doi:10.11588/fbbw.1983.0.26572.

- Dietwulf Baatz: Kastell Hesselbach und andere Forschungen am Odenwaldlimes. Gebr. Mann, Berlin, 1973, ISBN 3-7861-1059-X, (= Limesforschungen, 12).
- Dietwulf Baatz, Fritz-Rudolf Herrmann: Die Römer in Hessen. Lizenzausgabe. Nikol, Hamburg, 2002, ISBN 3-933203-58-9.
- Willi Beck, Dieter Planck: Der Limes in Südwestdeutschland. 2nd edn., Theiss, Stuttgart, 1980, ISBN 3-8062-0242-7.
- Stephan Bender: Unser Bild vom Neckarlimes: bald nur noch Geschichte? (pdf; 6.0 MB). In: Archäologie in Deutschland. 3/2011, Theiss, Stuttgart, 2011, ISSN 0176-8522, pp. 38f.
- Stephan Bender: Einem neuen Limes auf der Spur – Forschungen an der Nahtstelle von Odenwald- und Neckarlimes in Bad Friedrichshall. In: Archäologische Ausgrabungen in Baden-Württemberg 2011, pp. 44–49.
- Helmut Castritius, Manfred Clauss, Leo Hefner: Die römischen Steininschriften des Odenwaldes (RSO). In: Winfried Wackerfuß (ed.): Beiträge zur Erforschung des Odenwaldes und seiner Randlandschaften II. Festschrift für Hans H. Weber. Breuberg-Bund, Breuberg-Neustadt, 1977, pp. 237–308.
- Helmut Castritius, Manfred Clauss, Leo Hefner: Die römischen Steininschriften des Odenwaldes und seiner Randlandschaften (RSOR). In: Winfried Wackerfuß (ed.): Beiträge zur Erforschung des Odenwaldes und seiner Randlandschaften III. Breuberg-Bund, Breuberg-Neustadt, 1980, pp. 193–222.
- Philipp Filtzinger (ed.): Die Römer in Baden-Württemberg. 3rd edn., Theiss, Stuttgart, 1986, ISBN 3-8062-0287-7.
- Anita Gaubatz-Sattler: Zur zivilen Besiedlung zwischen den Limites im Neckar-Odenwald-Kreis. In: Andreas Thiel (ed.): Neue Forschungen am Limes. 4. Fachkolloquium der Deutschen Limeskommission 27./28. Februar 2007 in Osterburken. Theiss, Stuttgart, 2008, ISBN 978-3-8062-2251-7, pp. 111–121 (= Beiträge zum Welterbe Limes, 3)
- Claus-Michael Hüssen: Die römische Besiedlung im Umland von Heilbronn. Theiss, Stuttgart, 2000, ISBN 3-8062-1493-X, (= Forschungen und Berichte zur Vor- und Frühgeschichte in Baden-Württemberg, 78).
- Anne Johnson: Römische Kastelle des 1. und 2. Jahrhunderts n. Chr. in Britannien und in den germanischen Provinzen des Römerreiches. Philipp von Zabern, Mainz 1987, ISBN 3-8053-0868-X, (= Kulturgeschichte der antiken Welt, 37).
- Martin Kemkes: Vom Rhein an den Limes und wieder zurück. Die Besetzungsgeschichte Südwestdeutschlands. In: Dieter Planck et al.: Imperium Romanum. Roms Provinzen an Neckar, Rhein und Donau. Theiss, Stuttgart, 2005, ISBN 3-8062-2140-5, S. 44–53.
- Margot Klee: Der römische Limes im Hessen. Geschichte und Schauplätze des UNESCO-Welterbes. Verlag Friedrich Pustet, Regensburg, 2009, ISBN 978-3-7917-2232-0.
- Margot Klee: Der Limes zwischen Rhein und Main. Vom Beginn des obergermanischen Limes bei Rheinbrohl bis zum Main bei Grosskrotzenburg. Theiss, Stuttgart, 1989, ISBN 3-8062-0276-1.
- Klaus Kortüm: Zur Datierung der römischen Militäranlagen im obergermanisch-raetischen Limesgebiet. In: Saalburg-Jahrbuch. 49, 1998. Zabern, Mainz, 1998, pp. 5–65.
- Dieter Planck (ed.): Die Römer in Baden-Württemberg. Theiss, Stuttgart, 2005, ISBN 3-8062-1555-3.
- Dieter Planck: Das römische Walheim. Ausgrabungen 1980−1988. LDA Baden-Württemberg, Stuttgart, 1991, ISBN 3-927714-10-0, (= Archäologische Informationen aus Baden-Württemberg, 18).
- Britta Rabold: Der Odenwaldlimes in neuem Licht. Forschungsstand 2005 zum Kastellvicus von Mudau-Schloßau. In: Gabriele Seitz (ed.): Im Dienste Roms. Festschrift für Hans Ulrich Nuber. Greiner, Remshalden, 2006, ISBN 3-935383-49-5, pp. 279–284.
- Jörg Scheuerbrandt u. a.: Die Römer auf dem Gebiet des Neckar-Odenwald-Kreises. Grenzzone des Imperium Romanum. Herausgegeben vom Kreisarchiv des Neckar-Odenwald-Kreises. verlag regionalkultur, Ubstadt-Weiher 2009, ISBN 978-3-89735-524-8, (Beiträge zur Geschichte des Neckar-Odenwald-Kreises, 3).
- Hans Schönberger: Die römischen Truppenlager der frühen und mittleren Kaiserzeit zwischen Nordsee und Inn. In: Berichte der Römisch-Germanischen Kommission, 66 (1985), pp. 321ff.
- Michael P. Speidel: Die Brittones Elantienses und die Vorverlegung des obergermanisch-raetischen Limes. In: Fundberichte aus Baden-Württemberg, 11 (1986), pp. 309ff, doi:10.11588/fbbw.1986.0.27801.
- Bernd Steidl: Welterbe Limes – Roms Grenze am Main. Begleitband zur Ausstellung in der Archäologischen Staatssammlung München 2008. Logo, Obernburg, 2008, ISBN 978-3-939462-06-4.
- Bruno Trunk: Am Odenwaldlimes. Römerspuren in Schloßau und Umgebung. Buchen, 2007, ISBN 978-3-936866-17-9.
- Christoph Unz: Grinario. Das römische Kastell und Dorf in Köngen. Theiss, Stuttgart 1982, ISBN 3-8062-0302-4, (= Führer zu archäologischen Denkmälern in Baden-Württemberg, 8).

=== Historical excavations ===
- Johann Friedrich Knapp: Römische Denkmale des Odenwaldes, insbesondere der Grafschaft Erbach und Herrschaft Breuberg. (1813, 1814²,1854³)
- Der obergermanisch-raetische Limes des Roemerreiches. Division A, Vol. 5: Section 10 (Der Odenwaldlimes von Wörth am Main bis Wimpfen am Neckar), 1926, 1935; and Section 11 (Die Neckarlinie von Wimpfen bis Rottweil und Hüfingen), 1935.
- Der obergermanisch-raetische Limes des Roemerreiches. Division B, Vol. 5: Kastelle 46 (Friedrich Kofler: Das Kastell Lützelbach, 1904), 46a (Ernst Fabricius: Das Kastell Arnheiter Hof, 1915), 46b (Eduard Anthes: Das Kastell Seckmauern, 1914), 47 (Friedrich Kofler: Das Kastell Hainhaus bei Vielbrunn, 1897), 48 (Friedrich Kofler: Das Kastell Eulbach, 1896), 49 (Friedrich Kofler: Das Kastell Wuerzberg, 1896), 50 (Friedrich Kofler: Das Kastell Hesselbach, 1896), 51 (Karl Schumacher: Das Kastell bei Schlossau, 1900), 52 (Karl Schumacher: Das Kastell Oberscheidenthal, 1897), 53/53.1 (Karl Schumacher: Die Kastelle bei Neckarburken, 1898), 54/55 (Karl Schumacher: Kastell und Vicus bei Wimpfen, 1900), 56 (Heinrich Steimle: Das Kastell Böckingen, 1898), 57 (Adolf Mettler: Kastell Walheim, 1897), 58 (Adolf Mettler: Das Kastell Benningen, 1902), 59 (Ernst Kapf, Walter Barthel: Das Kastell Cannstatt, 1907), 60 (Adolf Mettler: Das Kastell Köngen, 1907), 61 (Oscar Paret: Das Kastell Rottenburg, 1936), 61a (Rudolf Herzog: Das [Kastell Sulz, 1897), 61b (Eugen Nägele: Das Kastell Waldmoessingen, 1897), 62 (Wilhelm Schleiermacher: Das große Lager und die Kastelle von Rottweil, 1936), 62a (Paul Revellio: Das Kastell Hüfingen, 1937).

== Abbreviations ==
- LiH: Margot Klee: Der römische Limes in Hessen. Geschichte und Schauplätze des UNESCO-Welterbes. Pustet, Regensburg, 2009, ISBN 978-3-7917-2232-0.
- ORL: Ernst Fabricius, Felix Hettner and Oscar von Sarwey (eds.): Der obergermanisch-raetische Limes des Roemerreiches. Petters, Heidelberg, Berlin und Leipzig, 1894-1937
- RiBW: Dieter Planck (ed.): Die Römer in Baden-Württemberg. Theiss, Stuttgart, 2005, ISBN 3-8062-1555-3.
- RiH: Dietwulf Baatz und Fritz-Rudolf Herrmann: Die Römer in Hessen. Lizenzausgabe. Nikol, Hamburg, 2002, ISBN 3-933203-58-9.
