= Limesfall =

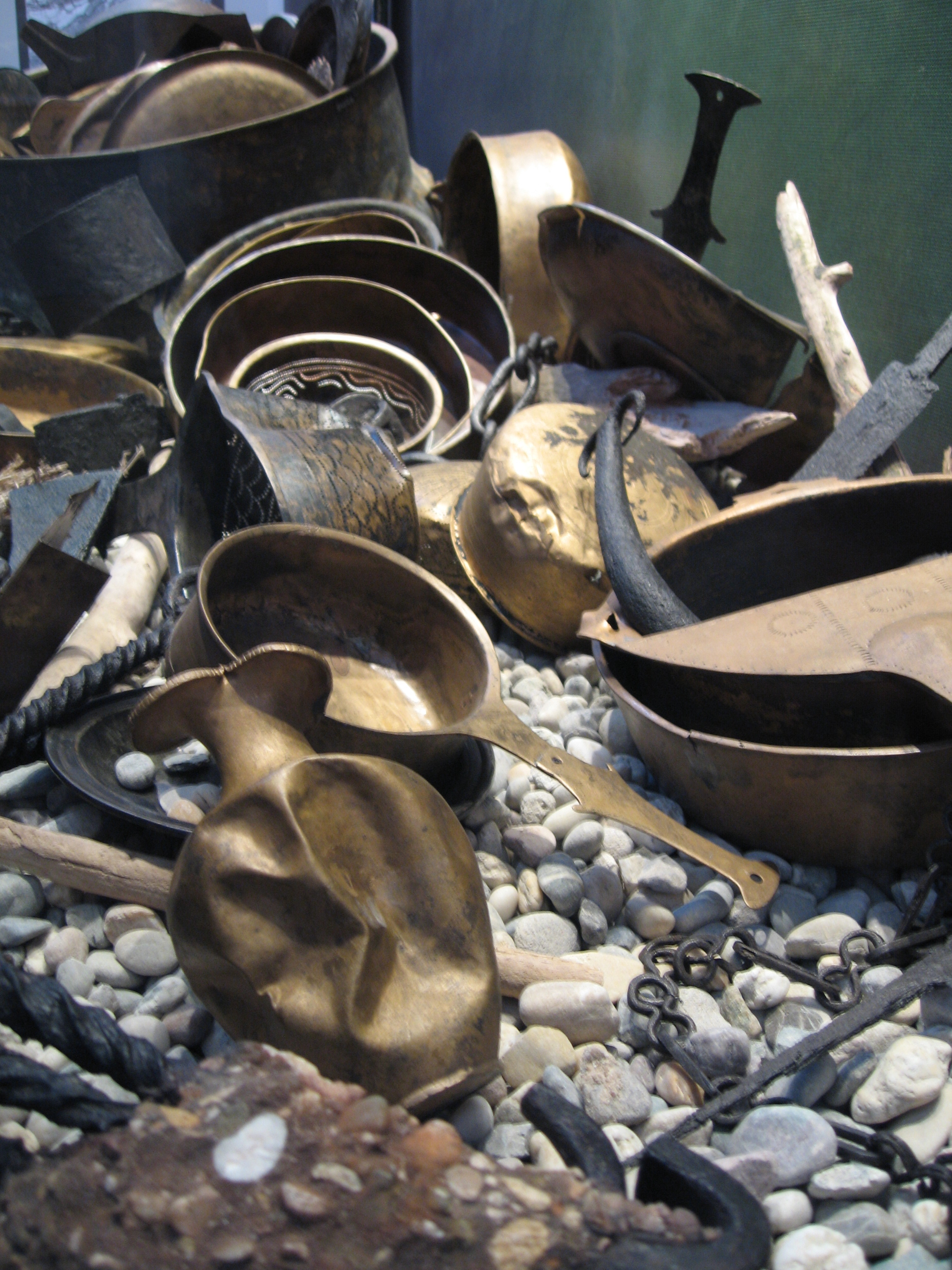
The hoard of Neupotz is directly linked to the plundering that took place after the Limesfall; hence it was also called the "Alemannian booty" (Alamannenbeute).

time table

The Limesfall is the name given to the abandonment of the Upper Germanic-Rhaetian Limes (built in 1st century) in the mid-3rd century AD by the Romans and the withdrawal of imperial troops from the provinces on the far side of the rivers Rhine and Danube to the line of those rivers. It is sometimes called the fall of the limes.

As a result of a series of informative archaeological finds and the re-evaluation of literary sources, the Limesfall no longer appears to have been a simple historical event, but a multi-layered, complex phenomenon whose historical linkages have not yet been fully understood. Because written sources are largely absent or of dubious reliability, research often relies on archaeological findings, which can be interpreted differently.

In the past, the monocausal assumption was that the Romans had been forced by armed events and external aggressors in the context of the so-called Alamannic Storm to withdraw from the area east of the Rhine and north of the Danube. Archaeological finds, however, suggest that this process was the result of years of development during the so-called Crisis of the 3rd century with a decline of the border provinces; and even civil wars within the Empire seem to have played a role. All this finally led in 259/260 to the de facto abandonment of the so-called Agri Decumates territory and the withdrawal of the Roman military border to the Rhine and the Danube.

== Literature ==
- Gerhard Fingerlin: Von den Römern zu den Alamannen. Neue Herren im Land. In: Archäologisches Landesmuseum Baden-Württemberg (publ.): Imperium Romanum. Roms Provinzen an Neckar, Rhein und Donau. Theiss et al., Stuttgart etc., 2005, ISBN 3-8062-1945-1, pp. 452–462.
- Klaus-Peter Johne, Thomas Gerhardt, Udo Hartmann (eds.): Deleto paene imperio Romano. Transformationsprozesse des Römischen Reiches im 3. Jahrhundert und ihre Rezeption in der Neuzeit. Steiner, Stuttgart, 2006, ISBN 3-515-08941-1.
- Martin Kemkes, Jörg Scheuerbrandt, Nina Willburger: Am Rande des Imperiums. Der Limes – Grenze Roms zu den Barbaren (= Württembergisches Landesmuseum. Archäologische Sammlungen: Führer und Bestandskataloge. Vol. 7). Published by the Württemberg State Museum, Stuttgart. Thorbecke, Stuttgart, 2002, ISBN 3-7995-3400-8, pp. 237–260, esp. pp. 249–253.
- Hans-Peter Kuhnen (ed.): Gestürmt – Geräumt – Vergessen? Der Limesfall und das Ende der Römerherrschaft in Südwestdeutschland. (= Württembergisches Landesmuseum. Archäologische Sammlungen: Führer und Bestandskataloge. Vol. 2). Accompanying volume to the special exhibition from 28 May to 1 November 1992 in the Limes Museum, Aalen, branch of the Württemberg State Museum, Stuttgart. Theiss, Stuttgart, 1992, ISBN 3-8062-1056-X.
- Hans Ulrich Nuber: Staatskrise im 3. Jahrhundert. Die Aufgabe der rechtsrheinischen Gebiete. In: Archäologisches Landesmuseum Baden-Württemberg (Hrsg.): Imperium Romanum. Roms Provinzen an Neckar, Rhein und Donau. Theiss et al., Stuttgart etc., 2005, ISBN 3-8062-1945-1, pp. 442–451.
- Hans Ulrich Nuber: Zeitenwende rechts des Rheins. Rom und die Alamannen. In: Karlheinz Fuchs, Martin Kempa, Rainer Redies (Red.): Die Alamannen. 4. Auflage. Theiss, Stuttgart, 2001, ISBN 3-8062-1535-9, pp. 59–68 (exhibition catalogue).
- Hans Ulrich Nuber: Das Ende des Obergermanisch-Raetischen Limes – eine Forschungsaufgabe. In: Archäologie und Geschichte des ersten Jahrtausends in Südwestdeutschland (Archäologie und Geschichte. Vol. 1). Thorbecke, Sigmaringen, 1990, ISBN 3-7995-7352-6, pp. 51–68.
- Marcus Reuter: Das Ende des raetischen Limes im Jahr 254 n. Chr. In: Bayerische Vorgeschichtsblätter. Vol. 72, 2007, pp. 77–149 (ditto pp. 78–86: Der „Limesfall“ – ein Überblick über die Forschungsgeschichte.).
- Marcus Reuter: Das Ende des obergermanischen Limes. Forschungsperspektiven und offene Fragen. In: Thomas Fischer (ed.): Die Krise des 3. Jahrhunderts n. Chr. und das Gallische Sonderreich. Akten des Interdisziplinären Kolloquiums Xanten 26 to 28 February 2009. Reichert, Wiesbaden, 2012, ISBN 978-3-89500-889-4 (Schriften des Lehr- und Forschungszentrums für die antiken Kulturen des Mittelmeerraumes – Centre for Mediterranean Cultures [ZAKMIRA] 8), pp. 307–323.
- Egon Schallmayer (ed.): Der Augsburger Siegesaltar. Zeugnis einer unruhigen Zeit (Saalburg-Schriften. Vol. 2). Bad Saalburg Museum, Homburg v. d. H. 1995, ISBN 3-931267-01-6.
- Egon Schallmayer (ed.): Niederbieber, Postumus und der Limesfall. Stationen eines politischen Prozesses (Saalburg-Schriften. Bd. 3). Bericht des ersten Saalburgkolloquiums. Saalburgmuseum, Bad Homburg v. d. H. 1996, ISBN 3-931267-02-4.
- Bernd Steidl: Der Verlust der obergermanisch-raetischen Limesgebiete. In: Ludwig Wamser, Christof Flügel und Bernward Ziegaus (eds.): Die Römer zwischen Alpen und Nordmeer. Zivilisatorisches Erbe einer europäischen Militärmacht. Catalogue handbook for the State Exhibition of the Free State of Bavaria, Rosenheim, 2000. von Zabern, Mainz, 2000, ISBN 3-8053-2615-7, pp. 75–80.
- Christian Witschel: Krise – Rezession – Stagnation? Der Westen des römischen Reiches im 3. Jahrhundert n. Chr. (= Frankfurter althistorische Beiträge. Vol. 4). Clauss, Frankfurt am Main, 1999, ISBN 3-934040-01-2, esp. pp. 210–233 (also: Frankfurt am Main, University, dissertation, 1998).
