= Odenwald (electoral district) =

Federal electoral district of Germany

Coordinates: 49°46′54″N 8°56′48″E

186 Odenwald
- Electoral district for the Bundestag
- Odenwald in 2025
- State: Hesse
- Population: 323,500 (2019)
- Electorate: 233,901 (2021)
- Major settlements: Rodgau; Rödermark; Seligenstadt
- Area: 1,115.1 km^{2}

Current electoral district
- Created: 1949
- Party: CDU
- Member: Patricia Lips
- Elected: 2025

Odenwald is an electoral constituency (German: Wahlkreis) represented in the Bundestag. It elects one member via first-past-the-post voting. Under the current constituency numbering system, it is designated as constituency 186. It is located in southern Hesse, comprising the district of Odenwaldkreis and eastern parts of the districts of Darmstadt-Dieburg and Landkreis Offenbach.

Odenwald was created for the inaugural 1949 federal election. From 2021 to 2025, it was represented by Jens Zimmermann of the Social Democratic Party (SPD). Since 2025 it has been represented by Patricia Lips of the CDU.

== Geography ==
Odenwald is located in southern Hesse. As of the 2021 federal election, it comprises the entirety of the Odenwaldkreis district as well as the municipalities of Babenhausen, Dieburg, Fischbachtal, Groß-Bieberau, Groß-Umstadt, Groß-Zimmern, Otzberg, Reinheim, and Schaafheim from the Darmstadt-Dieburg district and the municipalities of Hainburg, Mainhausen, Rodgau, Rödermark, and Seligenstadt from the Landkreis Offenbach district.

== History ==
Odenwald was created in 1949, then known as Dieburg. It acquired its current name in the 1980 election. In the 1949 election, it was Hesse constituency 21 in the numbering system. From 1953 through 1976, it was number 146. From 1980 through 1998, it was number 144. In the 2002 and 2005 elections, it was number 188. In the 2009 through 2021 elections, it was number 187. From the 2025 election, it has been number 186.

Originally, the constituency comprised the districts of Dieburg and Erbach. In the 1965 through 1972 elections, it comprised the districts of Dieburg and Erbach as well as the municipalities of Dietzenbach, Dreieichenhain, Dudenhofen, Froschhausen, Götzenhain, Hainhausen, Hainstadt, Jügesheim, Klein-Auheim, Klein-Krotzenburg, Klein-Welzheim, Mainflingen, Offenthal, Rembrücken, Seligenstadt, Steinheim am Main, Weiskirchen, and Zellhausen from the Landkreis Offenbach district. In the 1976 through 1994 elections, it acquired a configuration very similar to its current borders, but including the municipalities of Dietzenbach from the Landkreis Offenbach district and Eppertshausen and Münster (Hessen) from the Darmstadt-Dieburg district. In the 1994 election, it lost the municipality of Dietzenbach. In the 2002 election, it lost the municipalities of Eppertshausen and Münster (Hessen).

Election	No.	Name	Borders
1949	21	Dieburg	Dieburg district; Erbach district
1953	146	Dieburg	Dieburg district; Erbach district
1957	146	Dieburg	Dieburg district; Erbach district
1961	146	Dieburg	Dieburg district; Erbach district
1965	146	Dieburg	Dieburg district; Erbach district; Landkreis Offenbach district (only Dietzenbach, Dreieichenhain, Dudenhofen, Froschhausen, Götzenhain, Hainhausen, Hainstadt, Jügesheim, Klein-Auheim, Klein-Krotzenburg, Klein-Welzheim, Mainflingen, Offenthal, Rembrücken, Seligenstadt, Steinheim am Main, Weiskirchen, and Zellhausen municipalities)
1969	146	Dieburg	Dieburg district; Erbach district; Landkreis Offenbach district (only Dietzenbach, Dreieichenhain, Dudenhofen, Froschhausen, Götzenhain, Hainhausen, Hainstadt, Jügesheim, Klein-Auheim, Klein-Krotzenburg, Klein-Welzheim, Mainflingen, Offenthal, Rembrücken, Seligenstadt, Steinheim am Main, Weiskirchen, and Zellhausen municipalities)
1972	146	Dieburg	Dieburg district; Erbach district; Landkreis Offenbach district (only Dietzenbach, Dreieichenhain, Dudenhofen, Froschhausen, Götzenhain, Hainhausen, Hainstadt, Jügesheim, Klein-Auheim, Klein-Krotzenburg, Klein-Welzheim, Mainflingen, Offenthal, Rembrücken, Seligenstadt, Steinheim am Main, Weiskirchen, and Zellhausen municipalities)
1976	146	Dieburg	Odenwaldkreis district; Darmstadt-Dieburg district (only Babenhausen, Dieburg, Eppertshausen, Fischbachtal, Groß-Bieberau, Groß-Umstadt, Groß-Zimmern, Münster (Hessen), Otzberg, Reinheim, and Schaafheim municipalities); Landkreis Offenbach district (only Dietzenbach, Hainburg, Mainhausen, Rodgau, Rödermark, and Seligenstadt municipalities)
1980	144	Odenwald	Odenwaldkreis district; Darmstadt-Dieburg district (only Babenhausen, Dieburg, Eppertshausen, Fischbachtal, Groß-Bieberau, Groß-Umstadt, Groß-Zimmern, Münster (Hessen), Otzberg, Reinheim, and Schaafheim municipalities); Landkreis Offenbach district (only Dietzenbach, Hainburg, Mainhausen, Rodgau, Rödermark, and Seligenstadt municipalities)
1983	144	Odenwald	Odenwaldkreis district; Darmstadt-Dieburg district (only Babenhausen, Dieburg, Eppertshausen, Fischbachtal, Groß-Bieberau, Groß-Umstadt, Groß-Zimmern, Münster (Hessen), Otzberg, Reinheim, and Schaafheim municipalities); Landkreis Offenbach district (only Dietzenbach, Hainburg, Mainhausen, Rodgau, Rödermark, and Seligenstadt municipalities)
1987	144	Odenwald	Odenwaldkreis district; Darmstadt-Dieburg district (only Babenhausen, Dieburg, Eppertshausen, Fischbachtal, Groß-Bieberau, Groß-Umstadt, Groß-Zimmern, Münster (Hessen), Otzberg, Reinheim, and Schaafheim municipalities); Landkreis Offenbach district (only Dietzenbach, Hainburg, Mainhausen, Rodgau, Rödermark, and Seligenstadt municipalities)
1990	144	Odenwald	Odenwaldkreis district; Darmstadt-Dieburg district (only Babenhausen, Dieburg, Eppertshausen, Fischbachtal, Groß-Bieberau, Groß-Umstadt, Groß-Zimmern, Münster (Hessen), Otzberg, Reinheim, and Schaafheim municipalities); Landkreis Offenbach district (only Dietzenbach, Hainburg, Mainhausen, Rodgau, Rödermark, and Seligenstadt municipalities)
1994	144	Odenwald	Odenwaldkreis district; Darmstadt-Dieburg district (only Babenhausen, Dieburg, Eppertshausen, Fischbachtal, Groß-Bieberau, Groß-Umstadt, Groß-Zimmern, Münster (Hessen), Otzberg, Reinheim, and Schaafheim municipalities); Landkreis Offenbach district (only Hainburg, Mainhausen, Rodgau, Rödermark, and Seligenstadt municipalities)
1998	144	Odenwald	Odenwaldkreis district; Darmstadt-Dieburg district (only Babenhausen, Dieburg, Eppertshausen, Fischbachtal, Groß-Bieberau, Groß-Umstadt, Groß-Zimmern, Münster (Hessen), Otzberg, Reinheim, and Schaafheim municipalities); Landkreis Offenbach district (only Hainburg, Mainhausen, Rodgau, Rödermark, and Seligenstadt municipalities)
2002	188	Odenwald	Odenwaldkreis district; Darmstadt-Dieburg district (only Babenhausen, Dieburg, Fischbachtal, Groß-Bieberau, Groß-Umstadt, Groß-Zimmern, Otzberg, Reinheim, and Schaafheim municipalities); Landkreis Offenbach district (only Hainburg, Mainhausen, Rodgau, Rödermark, and Seligenstadt municipalities)
2005	188	Odenwald	Odenwaldkreis district; Darmstadt-Dieburg district (only Babenhausen, Dieburg, Fischbachtal, Groß-Bieberau, Groß-Umstadt, Groß-Zimmern, Otzberg, Reinheim, and Schaafheim municipalities); Landkreis Offenbach district (only Hainburg, Mainhausen, Rodgau, Rödermark, and Seligenstadt municipalities)
2009	187	Odenwald	Odenwaldkreis district; Darmstadt-Dieburg district (only Babenhausen, Dieburg, Fischbachtal, Groß-Bieberau, Groß-Umstadt, Groß-Zimmern, Otzberg, Reinheim, and Schaafheim municipalities); Landkreis Offenbach district (only Hainburg, Mainhausen, Rodgau, Rödermark, and Seligenstadt municipalities)
2013	187	Odenwald	Odenwaldkreis district; Darmstadt-Dieburg district (only Babenhausen, Dieburg, Fischbachtal, Groß-Bieberau, Groß-Umstadt, Groß-Zimmern, Otzberg, Reinheim, and Schaafheim municipalities); Landkreis Offenbach district (only Hainburg, Mainhausen, Rodgau, Rödermark, and Seligenstadt municipalities)
2017	187	Odenwald	Odenwaldkreis district; Darmstadt-Dieburg district (only Babenhausen, Dieburg, Fischbachtal, Groß-Bieberau, Groß-Umstadt, Groß-Zimmern, Otzberg, Reinheim, and Schaafheim municipalities); Landkreis Offenbach district (only Hainburg, Mainhausen, Rodgau, Rödermark, and Seligenstadt municipalities)
2021	187	Odenwald	Odenwaldkreis district; Darmstadt-Dieburg district (only Babenhausen, Dieburg, Fischbachtal, Groß-Bieberau, Groß-Umstadt, Groß-Zimmern, Otzberg, Reinheim, and Schaafheim municipalities); Landkreis Offenbach district (only Hainburg, Mainhausen, Rodgau, Rödermark, and Seligenstadt municipalities)
2025	186	Odenwald	Odenwaldkreis district; Darmstadt-Dieburg district (only Babenhausen, Dieburg, Fischbachtal, Groß-Bieberau, Groß-Umstadt, Groß-Zimmern, Otzberg, Reinheim, and Schaafheim municipalities); Landkreis Offenbach district (only Hainburg, Mainhausen, Rodgau, Rödermark, and Seligenstadt municipalities)

== Members ==
The constituency was first represented by Heinrich Ritzel of the Social Democratic Party (SPD) from 1949 to 1965. He was succeeded by fellow SPD member Willi Bäuerle from 1965 to 1976. Heinrich Klein of the SPD then served two terms as representative before Alexander Warrikoff of the Christian Democratic Union (CDU) won the constituency in 1983. He served until 1994, and was succeeded by Wolfgang Steiger for a single term. Adelheid D. Tröscher was elected for the SPD in 1998 and served until 2002, followed by fellow SPD member Erika Ober until 2005. Patricia Lips was elected in 2005, and re-elected in 2009, 2013, and 2017. Jens Zimmermann won the constituency for the SPD in 2021.

Election	Member	Party	%
1949	Heinrich Ritzel	SPD	36.6
1953	Heinrich Ritzel	SPD	39.9
1957	Heinrich Ritzel	SPD	45.3
1961	Heinrich Ritzel	SPD	47.2
1965	Willi Bäuerle	SPD	47.5
1969	Willi Bäuerle	SPD	50.5
1972	Willi Bäuerle	SPD	53.0
1976	Heinrich Klein	SPD	46.9
1980	Heinrich Klein	SPD	49.3
1983	Alexander Warrikoff	CDU	49.4
1987	Alexander Warrikoff	CDU	45.7
1990	Alexander Warrikoff	CDU	44.7
1994	Wolfgang Steiger	CDU	45.5
1998	Adelheid D. Tröscher	SPD	44.9
2002	Erika Ober	SPD	45.6
2005	Patricia Lips	CDU	42.0
2009	Patricia Lips	CDU	40.4
2013	Patricia Lips	CDU	46.9
2017	Patricia Lips	CDU	36.1
2021	Jens Zimmermann	SPD	32.3
2025	Patricia Lips	CDU	34.0

== Election results ==
=== 2025 election ===
Federal election (2025): Odenwald
Notes:	Blue background denotes the winner of the electorate vote. Pink background denotes a candidate elected from their party list. Yellow background denotes an electorate win by a list member, or other incumbent. A ✓ or ✗ denotes status of any incumbent, win or lose respectively.						
Party	Candidate	Votes	%	±%	Party votes	%	±%
CDU	Patricia Lips	65,469	34.0	▲6.1	59,337	30.7	▲6.5
SPD	✗ Jens Zimmermann	47,730	24.8	▼7.6	35,037	18.1	▼9.8
AfD	Helmut Klezl	35,565	18.5	▲10.0	36,239	18.8	▲9.7
Greens	Boris Wilfert	17,328	9.0	▼3.2	21,757	11.3	▼2.7
Left	Christian Wallerer	11,705	6.1	▲2.7	13,739	7.1	▲3.5
FDP	Mathias Zeuner	6,825	3.5	▼6.1	9,539	4.9	▼7.7
BSW					8,679	4.4	New
Tierschutzpartei					2,982	1.5	▼0.3
FW	Laura Schulz	5,264	2.7	▼0.1	2,736	1.4	▼0.5
Volt	Thomas Ponier-Kröhl	2,746	1.4	▲0.5	1,738	0.9	▲0.4
PARTEI					1,022	0.5	▼0.3
BD					302	0.2	New
Humanists					143	0.1	0.0
MLPD					66	<0.1	0.0
Informal votes		2,196			1,612		
Total valid votes		162,632			163,216		
Turnout		194,828	84.5	▲7.6			
CDU gain from SPD	Majority	17,739	9.2	N/A			

=== 2021 election ===
Federal election (2021): Odenwald
Notes:	Blue background denotes the winner of the electorate vote. Pink background denotes a candidate elected from their party list. Yellow background denotes an electorate win by a list member, or other incumbent. A ✓ or ✗ denotes status of any incumbent, win or lose respectively.						
Party	Candidate	Votes	%	±%	Party votes	%	±%
SPD	Jens Zimmermann	57,172	32.3	▲3.3	49,518	28.0	▲4.6
CDU	✗ Patricia Lips	49,367	27.9	▼8.2	42,857	24.2	▼8.5
Greens	Philip Krämer	21,630	12.2	▲4.4	24,694	13.9	▲5.1
FDP	Mathias Zeuner	17,110	9.7	▲2.5	22,433	12.7	▲1.7
AfD	Rüdiger Hashagen	14,963	8.5	▼3.3	15,983	9.0	▼3.2
Left	Marlene Wenzl	5,991	3.4	▼2.7	6,333	3.6	▼3.8
FW	Laura Schulz	5,003	2.8	▲1.4	3,322	1.9	▲1.0
Tierschutzpartei					3,213	1.8	▲0.7
dieBasis	Werner Krebs	3,699	2.1		3,171	1.8	
PARTEI					1,545	0.9	0.0
Volt	Kim Pfaff	1,602	0.9		948	0.5	
Team Todenhöfer					846	0.5	
Pirates					727	0.4	0.0
Gesundheitsforschung					289	0.2	
Independent	Dieter Stein	273	0.2				
ÖDP					202	0.1	▼0.1
NPD					198	0.1	▼0.2
Bündnis C					196	0.1	
V-Partei3					187	0.1	▼0.1
Humanists					155	0.1	
DKP					131	0.1	0.0
Bündnis 21					65	0.0	
MLPD					57	0.0	0.0
LKR					56	0.0	
Informal votes		3,020			2,704		
Total valid votes		176,810			177,126		
Turnout		179,830	76.9	▼2.0			
SPD gain from CDU	Majority	7,805	4.4				

=== 2017 election ===
Federal election (2017): Odenwald
Notes:	Blue background denotes the winner of the electorate vote. Pink background denotes a candidate elected from their party list. Yellow background denotes an electorate win by a list member, or other incumbent. A ✓ or ✗ denotes status of any incumbent, win or lose respectively.						
Party	Candidate	Votes	%	±%	Party votes	%	±%
CDU	✓ Patricia Lips	65,654	36.1	▼10.8	59,635	32.7	▼8.1
SPD	Jens Zimmermann	52,761	29.0	▼4.6	42,516	23.3	▼4.7
AfD	Robert Rankl	21,347	11.7		22,258	12.2	▲6.5
Greens	Frank Diefenbach	14,181	7.8	▲0.9	16,084	8.8	▼0.2
FDP	Milena Scinardo	13,139	7.2	▲4.6	19,948	10.9	▲5.7
Left	Kristin Hügelschäfer	11,138	6.1	▲1.1	13,433	7.4	▲1.9
Tierschutzpartei					2,091	1.1	
PARTEI					1,587	0.9	▲0.4
FW	Heinz Schumacher	2,651	1.5		1,514	0.8	▲0.1
Independent	Harald Frenzel	960	0.5				
Pirates					833	0.5	▼1.9
NPD					624	0.3	▼0.8
DM					409	0.2	
ÖDP					379	0.2	
V-Partei³					343	0.2	
BGE					293	0.2	
DKP					135	0.1	
MLPD					117	0.1	0.0
BüSo					30	0.0	0.0
Informal votes		3,143			2,745		
Total valid votes		181,831			182,229		
Turnout		184,974	78.9	▲3.3			
CDU hold	Majority	12,893	7.1	▼6.2			

=== 2013 election ===
Federal election (2013): Odenwald
Notes:	Blue background denotes the winner of the electorate vote. Pink background denotes a candidate elected from their party list. Yellow background denotes an electorate win by a list member, or other incumbent. A ✓ or ✗ denotes status of any incumbent, win or lose respectively.						
Party	Candidate	Votes	%	±%	Party votes	%	±%
CDU	✓ Patricia Lips	80,323	46.9	▲6.5	70,211	40.9	▲7.9
SPD	Jens Zimmermann	57,586	33.6	▲4.0	48,252	28.1	▲3.2
Greens	Felix Möller	11,854	6.9	▼2.5	15,560	9.1	▼2.2
AfD					9,864	5.7	
Left	Martin Deistler	8,621	5.0	▼1.7	9,459	5.5	▼2.3
Pirates	Michael Breukel	5,279	3.1		4,034	2.3	0.0
FDP	Heinrich Leonhard Kolb	4,581	2.7	▼8.1	8,964	5.2	▼12.1
NPD	Manfred Hönig	3,006	1.8	▲0.5	2,035	1.2	▲0.1
FW					1,307	0.8	
PARTEI					833	0.5	
REP					764	0.4	▼0.6
PRO					289	0.2	
BüSo					101	0.1	▼0.1
SGP					83	0.0	
MLPD					76	0.0	0.0
Informal votes		6,023			5,441		
Total valid votes		171,250			171,832		
Turnout		177,273	75.6	▲0.4			
CDU hold	Majority	22,737	13.3	▲2.5			

=== 2009 election ===
Federal election (2009): Odenwald
Notes:	Blue background denotes the winner of the electorate vote. Pink background denotes a candidate elected from their party list. Yellow background denotes an electorate win by a list member, or other incumbent. A ✓ or ✗ denotes status of any incumbent, win or lose respectively.						
Party	Candidate	Votes	%	±%	Party votes	%	±%
CDU	✓ Patricia Lips	69,191	40.4	▼1.6	56,677	33.0	▼2.6
SPD	Detlev Blitz	50,797	29.6	▼12.3	42,756	24.9	▼9.7
FDP	Heinrich Leonhard Kolb	18,409	10.7	▲5.6	29,697	17.3	▲5.6
Greens	Thomas Rehahn	16,215	9.5	▲4.6	19,379	11.3	▲1.8
Left	Sabine Leidig	11,574	6.8	▲2.8	13,403	7.8	▲3.0
Pirates					4,098	2.4	
NPD	Georg Hartmann	2,183	1.3	▼0.3	1,907	1.1	▼0.1
Tierschutzpartei					1,765	1.0	▲0.1
REP	Frederik Poetsch	1,772	1.0		1,723	1.0	0.0
Independent	Heinz Schumacher	822	0.5				
Independent	Michael Merkel	459	0.4				
BüSo					228	0.1	0.0
DVU					137	0.1	
MLPD					79	0.1	▼0.1
Informal votes		5,386			4,959		
Total valid votes		171,422			171,849		
Turnout		176,808	75.3	▼4.9			
CDU hold	Majority	18,394	10.8	▲10.7			

=== 2005 election ===
Federal election (2005):Odenwald
Notes:	Blue background denotes the winner of the electorate vote. Pink background denotes a candidate elected from their party list. Yellow background denotes an electorate win by a list member, or other incumbent. A ✓ or ✗ denotes status of any incumbent, win or lose respectively.						
Party	Candidate	Votes	%	±%	Party votes	%	±%
CDU	Patricia Lips	76,696	42.0	▲0.7	65,039	35.5	▼3.2
SPD	✗ Erika Ober	76,617	41.9	▼3.7	63,338	34.6	▼5.1
FDP	Heinirch Kolb	9,421	5.2	▼1.0	21,458	11.7	▲3.7
Greens	Claire Labigne	8,882	4.9	▼0.2	17,382	9.5	▼0.1
Left	Berthold Pfeiffer	7,275	4.0	▲2.7	8,810	4.8	▲3.7
NPD	Alfred Solf	2,912	1.6		2,176	1.2	▲0.9
REP					1,867	1.0	▲0.2
Tierschutzpartei					1,668	0.9	▲0.3
Christian Centre	Josef Happel	1,011	0.6	Steady			
GRAUEN					851	0.5	▲0.3
SGP					193	0.1	
BüSo					160	0.1	0.0
MLPD					80	0.0	
Informal votes		4,950			4,742		
Total valid votes		182,814			183,022		
Turnout		187,764	80.2	▼1.8			
CDU gain from SPD	Majority	79	0.1				
