= Brensbach =

- Municipality
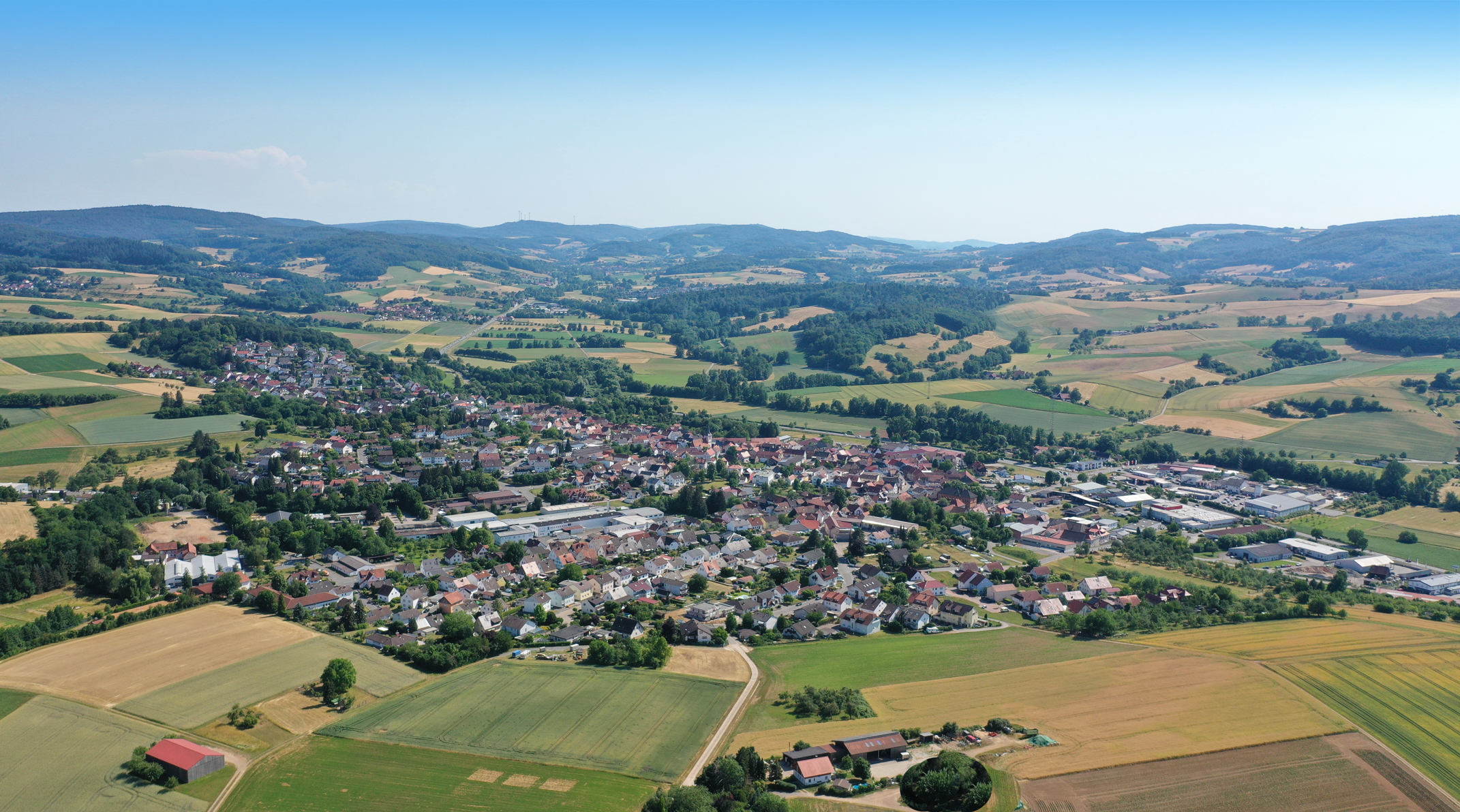
- Aerial view of Brensbach

- Flag Coat of arms

- Location of Brensbach within Odenwaldkreis district
- Interactive map of Brensbach
- Location within Germany Location within Hesse
- Coordinates: 49°46′N 08°53′E
- Country: Germany
- State: Hesse
- Admin. region: Darmstadt
- District: Odenwaldkreis

Government
  - Mayor (2020–26): Rainer Müller (SPD)

Area
  - Total: 23.18 km^{2} (8.95 sq mi)
- Elevation: 180–280 m (590–920 ft)

Population (2025-12-31)
  - Total: 4,787
  - Density: 206.5/km^{2} (534.9/sq mi)
- Time zone: UTC+01:00 (CET)
  - Summer (DST): UTC+02:00 (CEST)
- Postal codes: 64391–64395
- Dialling codes: 06161
- Vehicle registration: ERB
- Website: www.brensbach.de

Brensbach is a municipality in the Odenwaldkreis (district) in Hesse, Germany.

== Geography ==
=== Location ===
Brensbach lies in the northern Odenwald in the Gersprenz valley.

=== Neighbouring communities ===
Brensbach borders in the north on the towns of Groß-Bieberau and Reinheim (although this boundary is quite short) and the community of Otzberg (all in Darmstadt-Dieburg), in the east on the community of Höchst and the town of Bad König, in the south on the communities of Brombachtal and Reichelsheim and in the west on the communities of Fränkisch-Crumbach (all in the Odenwaldkreis) and Fischbachtal (Darmstadt-Dieburg).

=== Constituent communities ===
Brensbach’s Ortsteile are Affhöllerbach, Bierbach, Brensbach, Hippelsbach, Höllerbach, Kilsbach, Mummenroth, Nieder-Kainsbach, Stierbach, Wallbach and Wersau.

== Politics ==
The municipal election held on 26 March 2006 yielded the following results:

Parties and voter communities		% 2006	Seats; 2006	% 2001	Seats; 2001
CDU	Christian Democratic Union of Germany	42.9	11	37.0	11
SPD	Social Democratic Party of Germany	57.1	14	63.0	20
Total		100.0	25	100.0	31
Voter turnout in %		51.6		57.1	

=== Coat of arms ===
The community’s arms bear three charges on a white (silver) background: in the foot of the escutcheon are some blue waves, above which is a red fire, over which is an arc of five six-pointed stars. The arms are canting, suggesting the community’s name: the verb brennen means “burn” in German, and Bach means “brook”. According to legend, the namesake brook, when seen under starlight, looked as though it might be burning. Likelier, though, it looked so at sunset rather than at night, since stars would not be bright enough to produce such an effect.

=== Town partnerships ===
(France) The community of Brensbach has maintained a partnership arrangement since 1978 with the French community of Ézy-sur-Eure in the Eure department in Normandy.
