= Modautal =

- Municipality
- Coat of arms

- Location of Modautal within Darmstadt-Dieburg district
- Interactive map of Modautal
- Location within Germany Location within Hesse
- Coordinates: 49°46′N 08°43′E
- Country: Germany
- State: Hesse
- Admin. region: Darmstadt
- District: Darmstadt-Dieburg

Government
  - Mayor (2019–25): Jörg Lautenschläger

Area
  - Total: 31.79 km^{2} (12.27 sq mi)
- Elevation: 240–519 m (787–1,703 ft)

Population (2025-12-31)
  - Total: 5,099
  - Density: 160.4/km^{2} (415.4/sq mi)
- Time zone: UTC+01:00 (CET)
  - Summer (DST): UTC+02:00 (CEST)
- Postal codes: 64396–64397
- Dialling codes: 06167, 06254
- Vehicle registration: DA
- Website: www.modautal.de

Modautal (German pronunciation: [ˈmoːdaʊˌtaːl], lit. 'Modau Valley') is a municipality in the Darmstadt-Dieburg district, in Hesse, Germany. Approximately 5,050 inhabitants live in 11 districts on an area of 31 km^{2} with about 38.7% wood. The first historical chronicles date back to the 13th century.

== History ==
The municipality was formed in 1977 by putting together eleven districts during the so-called Gebietsreform. During the time of the Celts the area must have already been inhabited since the so-called "Heuneburg" on a hill in Fischbachtal was a Celtic castle where the people and their animals from the region could flee (Fluchtburg). To construct such a building, a lot of helping hands must have been living nearby.

In the Middle Ages, the eleven villages of Modautal belonged to different knight's families: The family of Rodenstein, the family from Frankenstein, the one from Mosbach, the family of Wallbrunn as well as Stumpf von Asbach and Kalb von Reinheim just to name a few. The oldest available documents date back to 1651 and are the so-called "Haingerichtsbücher" (written rules of the peasants in Brandau).

During the revolution in 1848 and due to failure of crops, huge parts of the inhabitants of the villages emigrated to North America.

== Town districts ==
| Name | COA | Description |
|---|---|---|
| Allertshofen and Hoxhohl | | Both villages are really close to each other. In a quiet valley of the small river Modau, they are located at 280 to 290 meters above sea level. |
| Asbach | | The village lies at 225 m above sea level in a valley next to the one with the Modau. There is a rehabilitation center there. |
| Brandau | | The biggest district of Modautal can easily be recognized from the hills surrounding it by the Cemetery of Honor with a little bell-tower with a metallic roof right at the border of the village. |
| Ernsthofen | | The sights of the village are an old water mill, the castle and the small Protestant church. An important institution is the primary school Modautalschule. |
| Herchenrode | | |
| Klein-Bieberau | | There is only one small road, which comes from Klein-Bieberau, to this village, so it literally lies at the end of the road. During summer, the water reservoir of the fire brigade serves as a swimming pool for the kids. |
| Lützelbach | | This little village lies at 420 meters above sea level. Its fire brigade has existed since 1655. Nowadays, it is famous among tourists for its restaurants. |
| Neunkirchen | | The books of the Protestant church in Neunkirchen date back to the times of the Thirty Years' War in the 17th century. Back then, most of the villages belonged to this parish. It is 520 meters above sea level at the top of a hill. The turning radar station can be seen from afar. |
| Neutsch | | Long before it became fashionable, three wind turbines were erected in the fields above the village. |
| Webern | | |
