= Aloys Rink =

German politician (1881–1971)

- Born: Aloys Georg Rink; 4 March 1881; Urberach, Hesse-Nassau, Prussia, Germany (Note: Several sources give the place of his birth, instead, as Vienna, Austria.)
- Died: 21 June 1971 (aged 90); Groß-Umstadt, Darmstadt-Dieburg, Hesse, West Germany
- Other name: Ludwig Wiener
- Occupations: Metal worker, politician
- Political party: SPD; USPD; KPD
- Spouse: Regina Groh (1884–)
- Children: 4
- Parent(s): Georg Rink; Karolina Langen

Aloys Georg Rink (4 March 1881 – 21 June 1971) was a German politician (KPD, SPD). He served as a member of the Landtag (state parliament) in the so-called People's State of Hesse ("Volksstaat Hessen") between 1921 and 1922 and again between 1931 and 1933. After 1945, with Hesse now a part of the US occupation zone until May 1949, and thereafter a constituent element of the Federal Republic of Germany (West Germany), Rink served as a member of the Landtag (state parliament) of Hesse between December 1946 and November 1950.

== Life ==
Aloys Georg "Ludwig Wiener" Rink was born into a working-class family in Vienna. or Urberach (near Darmstadt). Sources differ. Georg Rink, his father, worked as a "rabbit/hare fur cutter"("Hasenhaareschneider") and was a member of the "Clothing Workers' [Trades] Union" ("Bekleidungsarbeitverband "). After leaving school Aloys Rink trained as an industrial metal worker.

Supporting himself as a skilled metal worker and living in Urberach, he joined the Social Democratic Party (SPD) in 1896. The government had allowed Bismarck's "Anti-Socialist Laws" to lapse in 1890, meaning the party was no longer outlawed, but at the time when Rink joined it the SPD was still regarded by most commentators as something from outside the political mainstream. He would resign from the party in 1919, but rejoined in 1922. As a young man, hungry for education, he attended the Trades Union Academy in Berlin as well as the Party and Commercial Academy in Frankfurt am Main. Sources mention but do not identify other colleges where he attended courses. Rink also became a noted autodidact, informing himself in particular depth about Politics and Economics. On 26 June 1905 Aloys Rink married Regina Groh at Urberach. The marriage produced four recorded children.

During the war years Rink had connections with the anti-war Spartacus League. In 1917 the SPD finally broke apart as internal tensions over the party leadership's parliamentary support for the war became unsustainable: Aloys Rink was part of the break-away faction that became the Independent Social Democratic Party of Germany ("Unabhängige Sozialdemokratische Partei Deutschlands" / USPD). In November 1919 he attended the USPD party congress in Leipzig as a delegate. At the end of 1918 the USPD itself splintered: by or during the early part of 1919 Rink, like most USPD activists, had switched his political allegiance to the newly formed Communist Party. Shortly afterwards he accepted a position as a party secretary for the municipality of Urberach.

Between 1919 and 1933 Aloys Rink served as a member of the Urberach town council. On 27 November 1921 he was elected as one of just two Communist members of the 70 seat Hesse state parliament. However, during the aftermath of the so-called March Action he backed the former party leader Paul Levi, whose political differences with the newly powerful hardliner faction continued to intensify. Levi was then, in the context of a further party split, expelled from the mainstream communist party. Rink's own position as a Communist Landtag member became untenable and he resigned his seat on 19 July 1922. His seat was taken by Katharina Roth. Aloys Rink resumed his membership of the SPD and returned to his work as a skilled metal worker, while still continuing to serve on the town council.

As German politics became increasingly polarised, and following an unsuccessful Reichstag candidacy in 1930, Rink returned to the Landtag at the election of 15 November 1931, but now as one of 15 SPD members. The total number of seats was, as before, 70. The 1931 election was the first in which the National Socialists won the largest number of seats in the Hesse Landtag. The only other party to increase its vote share was the Communist Party. The vote shares of all the conventionally democratic parties had fallen since 1927. However, following a successful court case brought by the so-called Economic Party the 1931 state election in Hesse of was declared invalid by the State Court on 9 May 1932. A new election was therefore held on 19 June 1932. The vote share of the National Socialists again increased, so that now they held 32 seats rather than 27. However, the SPD also staged a small recovery (at the expense of the Communists), the number of their seats increasing to 17. Aloys "Ludwig" Rink retained his seat. After the National Socialists took power nationally, the country was rapidly transformed into a one-party dictatorship during the first part of 1933. The new government was keen to bring Germany more closely into line with the Anglo-French government model by imposing a powerfully centralised government structure: under the terms of legislation enacted art the end of March 1933 ("Vorläufiges Gesetz zur Gleichschaltung der Länder") state level parliaments were abolished, formally with effect from 7 July 1933. Aloys Rink's parliamentary career came to an end for the duration of the Hitler period, along with his role as a town councillor.

Between 1933 and 1945 Aloys Rink survived several periods in state detention. In October 1933 he was taken into the concentration camp at Osthofen (near Worms). Later on he was held at the prison in Darmstadt for slightly under half a year, starting in December 1939. Later he was detained at Dachau for several months during 1944.

With the fall of the National Socialists in 1945, non-Nazi party membership ceased to be illegal, and Aloys Rink, by now aged 64, resumed his SPD membership, becoming a co-refounder of the party in Hesse. While resuming his long-standing former role as a town councillor in Urberach, he took a senior post with the welfare department for Dieburg District.

Under the post-war military occupation the state of Hesse was relaunched, and a new 90 seat democratically elected Landtag (state parliament) was inaugurated in December 1946. The SPD, with 38 seats, became the largest single party in the assembly, although it fell far short of an overall majority, and the first post-war state government was accordingly a SPD/CDU "grand coalition". Aloys Rink served as an SPD member of the assembly, representing Electoral District 2 ("Wahlkreis II" - Offenbach & Dieburg) between December 1946 and November 1950.

Aloys Rink died at Groß-Umstadt (in the Darmstadt-Dieburg region) on 21 June 1971. Sources asserting that he died in nearby Urberach are incorrect. Interviewed forty years later, Klaus-Joachim Rink described his grandfather as "a very balanced man, with a great sense of justice" ("...ein ausgeglichener Mann mit großem Gerechtigkeitsempfinden."). A memory which the grandson particularly treasured was the time that Aloys Rink had given him a bicycle, which in the context of the post-war austerity had been an exceptionally generous present.
