= Jens Zimmermann (politician) =

German politician (born 1981)

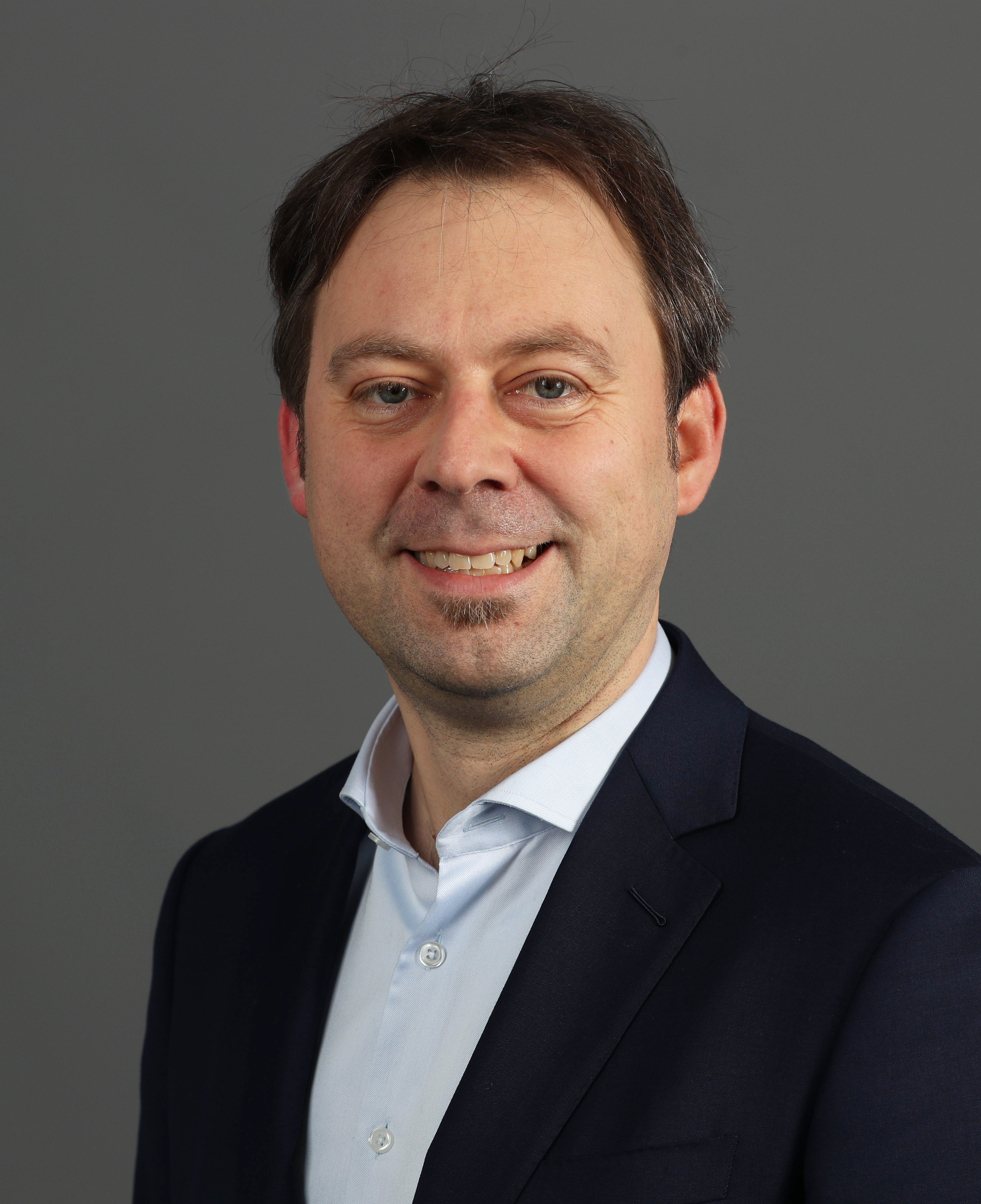
- Zimmermann in 2020

Member of the Bundestag; from Hesse
- In office 22 October 2013 – 25 March 2025
- Preceded by: Multi-member district
- Succeeded by: Patricia Lips
- Constituency: State list (2013–2021); Odenwald (2021–2025)

Personal details
- Born: 9 September 1981 (age 45) Groß-Umstadt, West Germany
- Party: Social Democratic
- Education: Catholic University of Eichstätt-Ingolstadt; Regent's University London

Jens Zimmermann (born 9 September 1981) is a German politician of the Social Democratic Party (SPD) who has been serving as a member of the Bundestag from the state of Hesse since 2013.

== Political career ==
Zimmermann first became a member of the Bundestag in the 2013 German federal election. He is a member of the Finance Committee and the Committee on the Digital Agenda. In this capacity, he is his parliamentary group's rapporteur on measures against money laundering and terrorist financing.

In addition to his committee assignments, Zimmermann is part of the German-British Parliamentary Friendship Group.

In the negotiations to form a coalition government under the leadership of Chancellor Angela Merkel following the 2017 federal elections, Zimmermann was part of the working group on digital policy, led Helge Braun, Dorothee Bär and Lars Klingbeil. In similar negotiations to form a so-called traffic light coalition of the SPD, the Green Party and the FDP following the 2021 federal elections, he led his party's delegation in the working group on digital policy; his co-chairs from the other parties were Malte Spitz and Andreas Pinkwart.

In February 2025, Zimmermann lost his seat in Bundestag for district Odenwald against Patricia Lips.

== Other activities ==
- Federal Financial Supervisory Authority (BaFin), Member of the Administrative Council
- Business Forum of the Social Democratic Party of Germany, Member of the Political Advisory Board (since 2018)
- IG BAU, Member
- German Alpine Club, Member
