= Katharina Roth =

German politician

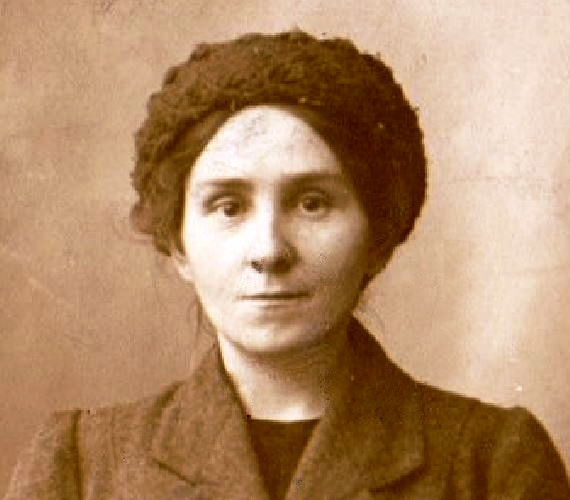
Katharina Roth, c. 1915

Katharina Roth (born Katharina Sehnert; 26 June 1882 – 3 June 1967) was a German politician and member of the Communist Party of Germany.

== Life ==
=== Family provenance ===
Anna Katharina Sehnert was born in Schaafheim, at that time a small village in the hills to the east of Darmstadt. Nikolaus Sehnert, her father, was a building worker. Her mother was Anna Katharina Sehnert, born Anna Katharina Kreh. Katharina Sehnert married Jakob Roth (1881–1944), from nearby Groß-Zimmern.

=== Life and politics ===
Before her marriage she worked in domestic service. As it became legally possible for women to participate in politics (though not, yet, to vote), in 1907, she joined the Social Democratic Party. In 1914 the decision of the party leadership to agree to what amounted to a parliamentary truce for the duration of the war created acute and growing tensions within the party which led to a formal split in 1916. Roth was one of those who broke away to form the anti-war Independent Social Democratic Party ("Unabhängige Sozialdemokratische Partei Deutschlands" / USPD). Within the USPD she belonged on the leftwing, and when, after the revolution, the USPD itself split apart, at the end of 1920, she was part of the majority faction that joined up with the newly emerging Communist Party of Germany.

In the Communist Party she was seen as a member of the left-wing faction around Ruth Fischer and Arkadi Maslow. She is also described as a "women's leader". In 1922 she became a member of the Regional Parliament ("Landtag") for Hesse, taking the seat vacated through the resignation of her party comrade Aloys Rink when he resigned from the fractious Communist Party and returned to the Social Democrats. She was re-elected to the Landtag in 1924. After the short-lived leadership of Fischer and Maslow were deposed dur9ng the Autumn of 1925, Roth found herself a member of the internal party opposition to the new pro-Stalin leadership team around Ernst Thälmann. In May 1927 she was expelled from the party. She nevertheless continued to be a member of the Landtag till the end of the parliamentary term, in November 1927.

During the first part of 1928 she joined the newly formed Lenin League ("Leninbund"). Subsequently, however, she ceased to be politically active. During her final decades she lived in Langen, a small town between Frankfurt (to its north) and Darmstadt (to its south). It was there that Jakob Roth died in 1944. Katharina Roth died in Langen on 3 June 1967.
