= Beerbach =

Beerbach may refer to:

- Beerbach (Mergbach), a river of Hesse, Germany, tributary of the Mergbach
- Beerbach (Modau), a river of Hesse, Germany, tributary of the Modau
- Ober-Beerbach, a village of Seeheim-Jugenheim in Hesse, Germany
- Beerbach (Abenberg), a district of Abenberg in Bavaria, Germany
