= Beerbach (Modau) =

River in Germany

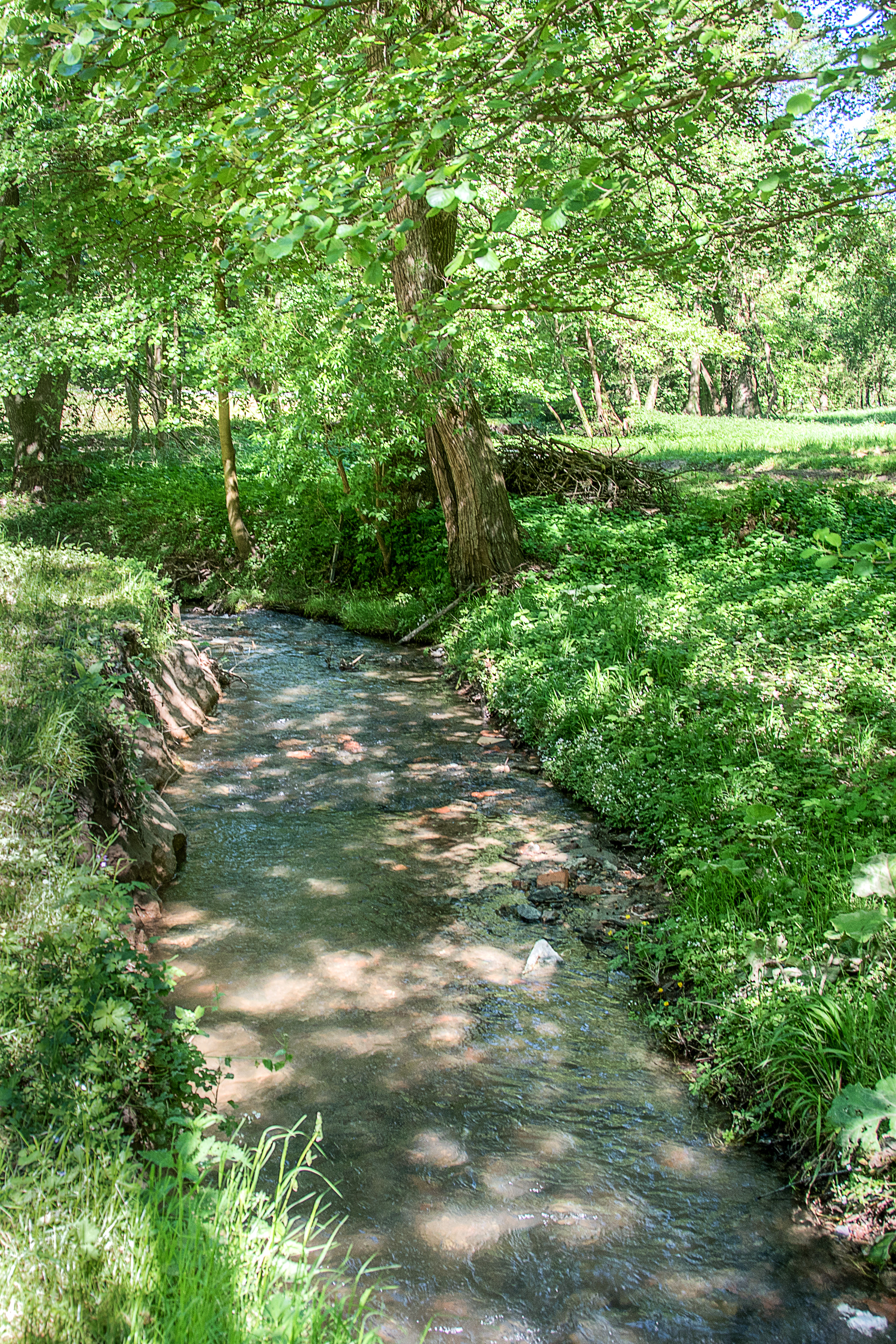
- The Beerbach between Haus Burgwald and Frankenberg Mill in Mühltal

Location
- Country: Germany
- State: Hesse

Physical characteristics
- Mouth
  - location: Modau
  - coordinates: 49.8149°N 8.6698°E

The Beerbach is a small river of Hesse, Germany and tributary of the Modau. It joins the Modau on the right bank at Darmstadt.

== See also ==
- List of rivers of Hesse
