= Matzbach =

Matzbach may refer to:

- Matzbach (Hollerbach), a river of Hesse, Germany, tributary of the Hollerbach
- Matzbach (Geislbach), a river of Bavaria, Germany, tributary of the Geislbach
