= Billings, Hesse =

Coordinates: 49°45′25″N 8°47′39″E

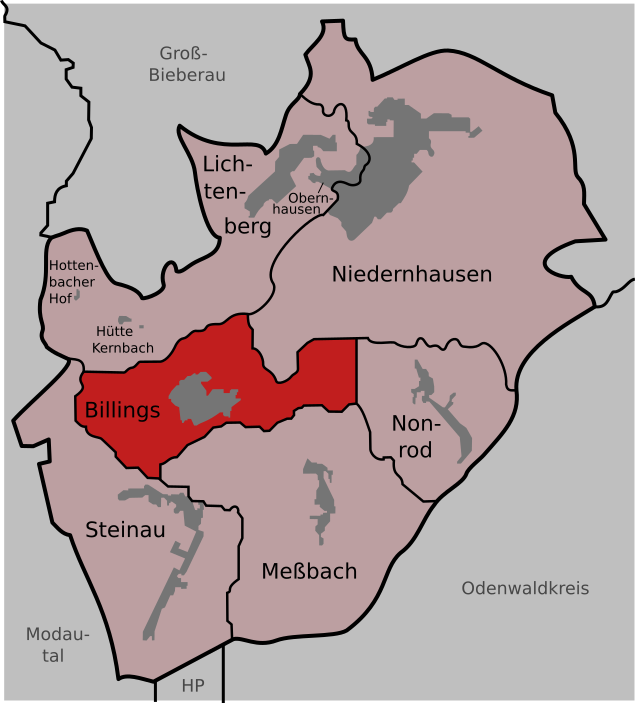
Map of the municipality of Fischbachtal with Billings highlighted

Billings (German pronunciation: [ˈbɪlɪŋs]) is a village located south of Frankfurt am Main in the southern part of the German state of Hessen. It has been incorporated into the municipality of Fischbachtal in the district of Darmstadt-Dieburg.

== Sister cities ==
- Billings, Montana, United States
