= Philip Krämer =

German politician (born 1992)

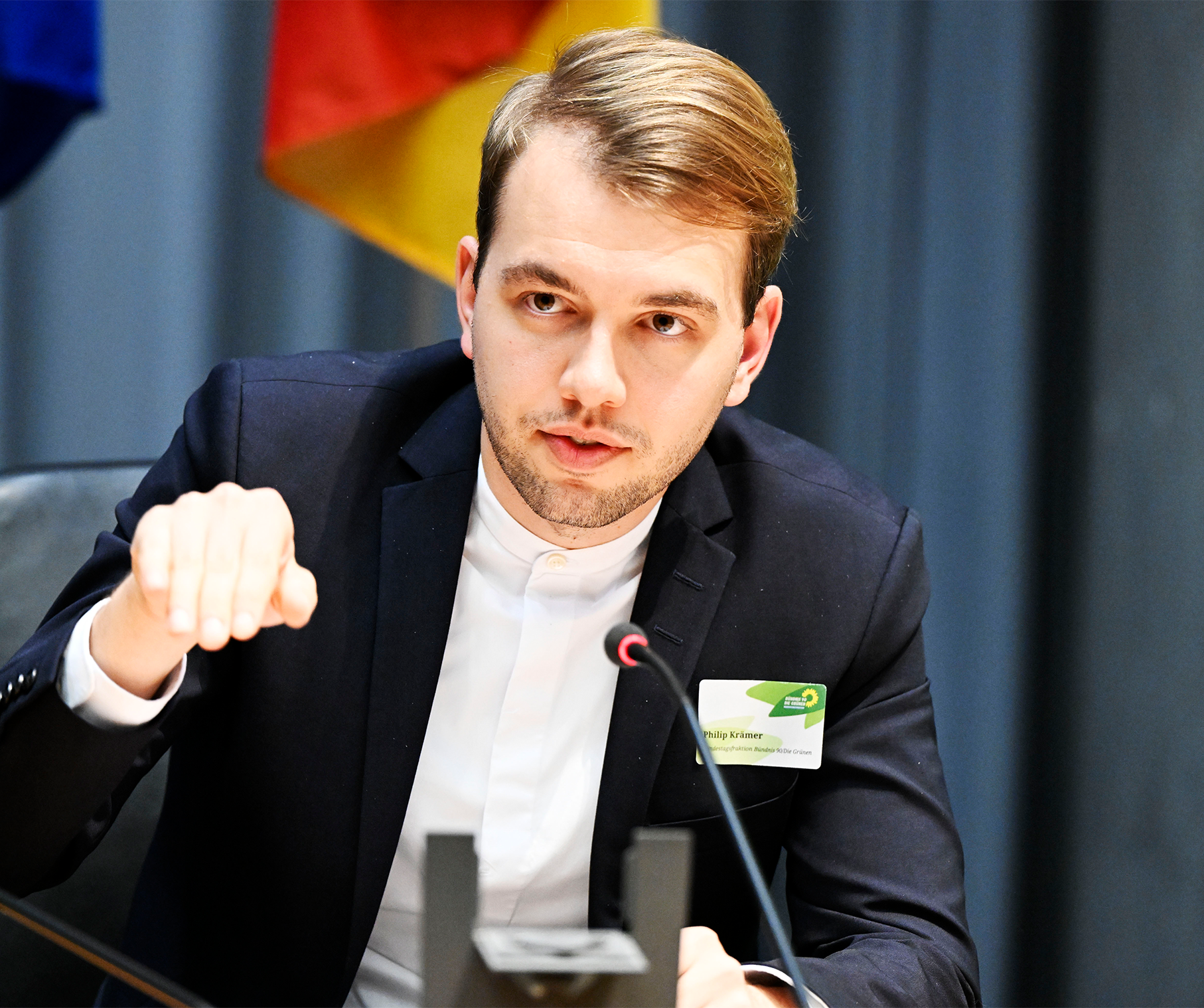

Member of the Bundestag
- Incumbent
- Assumed office 26 October 2021

Personal details
- Born: 29 February 1992 (age 34) Frankfurt am Main, Germany
- Party: Alliance 90/The Greens

Philip Krämer (born 29 February 1992) is a German politician of Alliance 90/The Greens who has been serving as a member of the Bundestag from 2021 to 2025 since the 2021 German federal election.

== Political career ==
=== Career in state politics ===
Krämer led the Green Youth in Hesse from 2017 to 2018. From 2019 to 2021, he served as co-chair of the Green Party in Hesse, alongside Sigrid Erfurth.

=== Member of the German Parliament, 2021–2025 ===
Krämer became a member of the Bundestag in 2021, representing the Odenwald district. In parliament, he has since been serving on the Defence Committee and the Sports Committee. He also joined a study commission set up to investigate the entire period of German involvement in Afghanistan from 2001 to 2021 and to draw lessons for foreign and security policy in future.

== Other activities ==
- German Poland Institute (DPI), Member of the Board of Trustees (since 2022)
- German Red Cross (DRK), Member
- SV Darmstadt 98, Member
