= Hollerbach =

Hollerbach (or Höllerbach) is a Germanic surname, and a place name. It may refer to:

== People ==
- Benedict Hollerbach (born 2001), German footballer
- Bernd Hollerbach (born 1969), German football player and coach
- John M. Hollerbach, American professor of computer science
- Kit Hollerbach, American comedian

== Rivers ==
both in Hesse, Germany

- Höllerbach (Hollerbach), tributary of the Hollerbach
- Hollerbach (Brensbach), tributary of the Brensbach

== Other ==
- Hollerbach, a city area of Buchen, a town in Baden-Württemberg, Germany
