= Brombachtal =

- Municipality
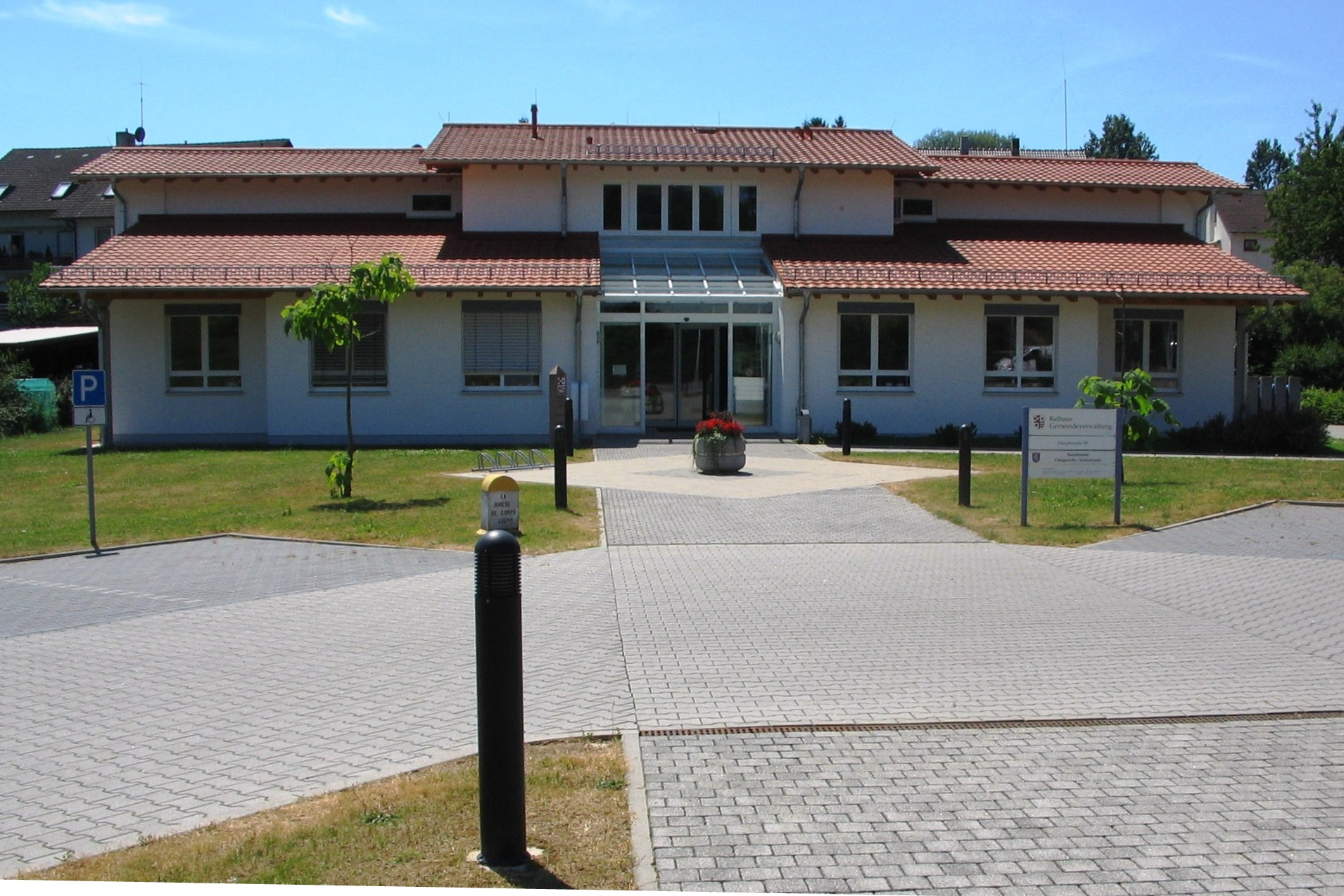
- Town hall

- Coat of arms

- Location of Brombachtal within Odenwaldkreis district
- Interactive map of Brombachtal
- Location within Germany Location within Hesse
- Coordinates: 49°44′N 08°58′E
- Country: Germany
- State: Hesse
- Admin. region: Darmstadt
- District: Odenwaldkreis

Government
  - Mayor (2022–28): Andreas Koch (CDU)

Area
  - Total: 20.44 km^{2} (7.89 sq mi)
- Elevation: 250–420 m (820–1,380 ft)

Population (2025-12-31)
  - Total: 3,452
  - Density: 168.9/km^{2} (437.4/sq mi)
- Time zone: UTC+01:00 (CET)
  - Summer (DST): UTC+02:00 (CEST)
- Postal codes: 64753
- Dialling codes: 06063
- Vehicle registration: ERB
- Website: www.brombachtal.de

Brombachtal is a municipality in the Odenwaldkreis (district) in Hesse, Germany.

== Geography ==
=== Location ===
The community lies in the centre of the Odenwald near Bad König.

=== Neighbouring communities ===
Brombachtal borders in the north and east on the town of Bad König, in the south on the town of Michelstadt and in the west on the communities of Reichelsheim and Brensbach.

=== Constituent communities ===
Brombachtal’s five Ortsteile are Birkert, Böllstein, Hembach, Kirchbrombach (the community’s administrative seat) and Langenbrombach.

== Politics ==
The municipal election held on 26 March 2006 yielded the following results:

Parties and voter communities		% 2006	Seats; 2006	% 2001	Seats; 2001
CDU	Christian Democratic Union of Germany	36.6	7	35.3	8
SPD	Social Democratic Party of Germany	46.6	9	52.0	12
GREENS	Bündnis 90/Die Grünen	9.4	2	10.2	2
FDP	Free Democratic Party	7.4	1	2.6	1
Total		100.0	19	100.0	23
Voter turnout in %		51.5		60.7	

=== Mayor ===
At the runoff election on 11 June 2004, Willi Kredel (SPD) was elected Mayor of Brombachtal with 66.9% of the vote.

== Culture and sightseeing ==
=== Buildings ===
In the centre of Kirchbrombach stands the Evangelical church built in the mid 15th century with its polyptych, or “winged”, altar, built in 1518 and dedicated to Saint Alban. The church belonged until the Reformation to Saint Alban’s Abbey in Mainz.

== Economy and infrastructure ==
=== Transport ===
The community is linked to the long-distance road network by Bundesstraßen 45 (Hanau - Eberbach) and 47 (Walldürn - Worms).
