= Hollerbach (Brensbach) =

River in Germany

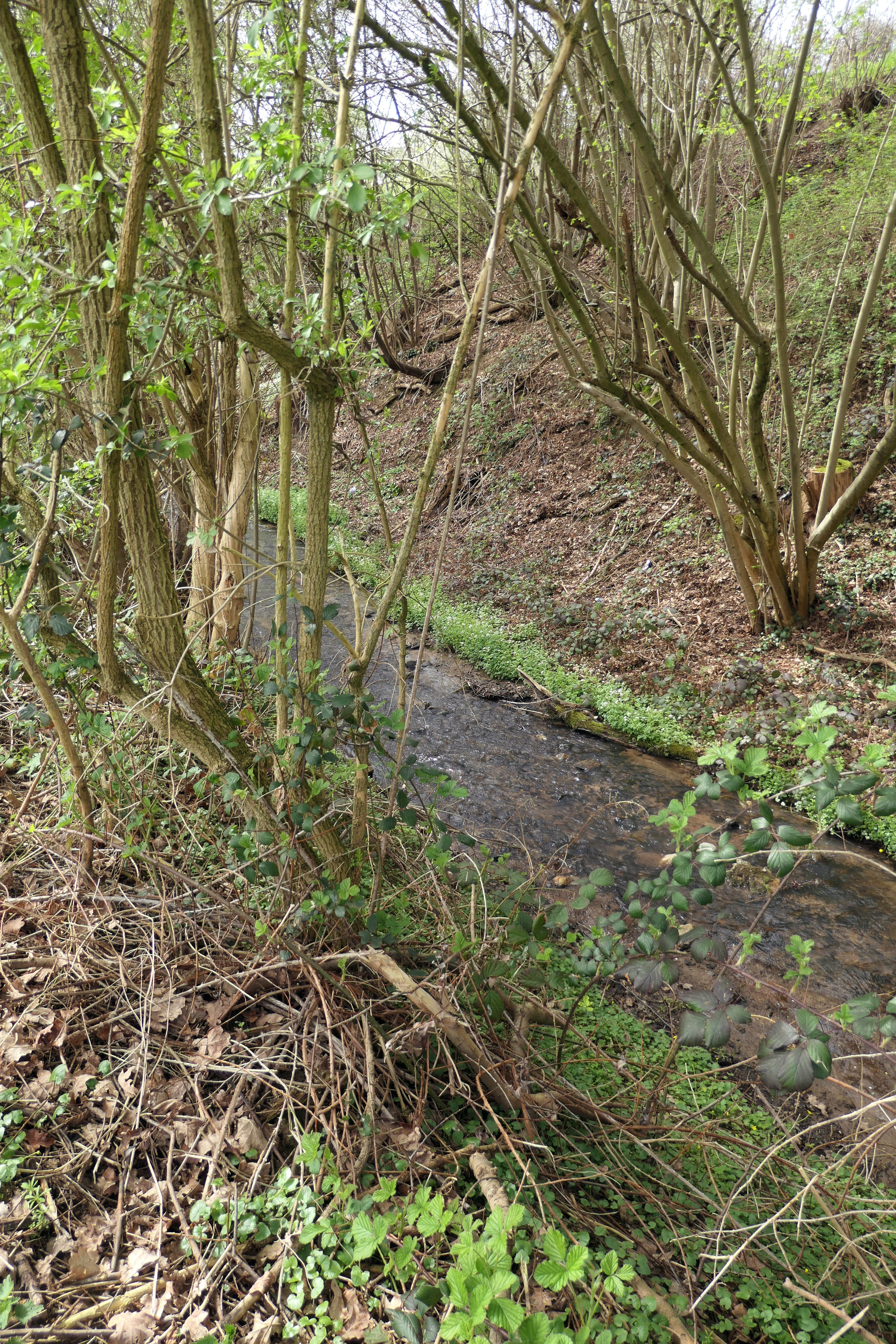
- The Hollerbach southwest of Höllerbach (a district of Brensbach)

Location
- Country: Germany
- States: Hesse

Physical characteristics
- Mouth
  - location: Brensbach
  - coordinates: 49.7729°N 8.8895°E

Basin features
- Progression: Brensbach→ Gersprenz→ Main→ Rhine→ North Sea
- Tributaries
  - left: Höllerbach, Bach von den Rehwiesen, Matzbach

The Hollerbach is a small river of Hesse, Germany. It is an approximately two-kilometer-long tributary of the Brensbach, flowing into it on the right bank near the village Brensbach.

== Course ==
The Hollerbach stream springs in the Odenwald mountain range at an elevation of approximately 328 metres (1,076 ft) in a mixed forest northeast of Höllerbach, a district of Brensbach, on the southwest slope of the Hermesberg mountain. It initially flows southwest for about 300 metres (980 ft) through wooded terrain, which then gives way to a strip of meadow. There, the Hollerbach is joined on its left bank by the Höllerbach stream, which flows in from the southeast. After just under a kilometer, the Hollerbach reaches the village of Höllerbach, where it is joined by the stream from the Rehwiesen meadows, also flowing from the southeast. The Hollerbach then runs along the southern edge of the village and continues southwest through fields and meadows, accompanied by the L 3106 road. Shortly before reaching Brensbach, it receives the Matzbach stream on its left bank and finally flows into the Brensbach stream at an elevation of approximately 158 metres (518 ft), east of Brensbach.

== See also ==
- List of rivers of Hesse
