= Adelheid Tröscher =

German educator and politician (born 1939)

Member of the Bundestag; from Hesse
- In office 10 November 1994 – 17 October 2002
- Preceded by: Multi-member district
- Succeeded by: Erika Ober
- Constituency: State list (1994–1998); Odenwald (1998–2002)

Personal details
- Born: 16 February 1939 (age 87) Berlin, Germany
- Party: Social Democratic
- Parent: Tassilo Tröscher (father)

Adelheid D. Tröscher (born 16 February 1939) is a German educator and politician (SPD). She was a member of the German Bundestag from 1994 to 2002.

== Early life and education ==
Tröscher was born in Berlin. She attended grammar school and high school in Ithaca, New York, United States, graduating in 1959. She then studied education, history and English language and literature in Marburg, Jugenheim an der Bergstraße and Frankfurt am Main and passed her first and second state examinations to become a teacher at secondary schools. In 1962 she was accepted into the teaching profession and from 1975 to 1976 she worked in the school department of the Regierungspräsidium Darmstadt. From 1986 to 1992, she was head of the Paul Hindemith Comprehensive School in Frankfurt am Main.

== Political career ==
Tröscher joined the SPD in 1966. From 1972 to 1977, from 1981 to 1989 and in 1991 she was a city councillor of the city of Frankfurt am Main, and from 1992 to 1993 a full-time district councillor of the Kreis Offenbach.

From November 1994 to October 2002, Tröscher was a member of the German Bundestag for two terms. In the 1994 Bundestag election, she entered parliament via the SPD state list, and in the 1998 Bundestag election she won the direct mandate in the constituency 144 (Odenwald). From 1994 to 2002, she was a member of the Committee on Economic Cooperation and Development and from 1996 to 2002, she was the SPD parliamentary group's spokesperson on development policy.

== Post-political career ==
After leaving the parliamentary group in the Bundestag of her own accord, she became involved in the SPD on a voluntary basis, particularly in the Forum One World, which deals with development policy issues. She also heads the Rhine-Main regional group of Transparency International. She is also involved as chairwoman of the Citoyen Foundation, which supports civic engagement and is particularly concerned with the artistic and aesthetic education of children and young people.

== Other activities ==
Tröscher is a member of GEW, AWO, Kinderschutzbund, Pro Familia and medico international. In 1999 she became a member of the board of trustees and the administrative committee of Deutsche Stiftung für internationale Entwicklung (DSE) and a member of German Foundation for International Development. (DSE) and a member of German Agro Action.

== Personal life ==
Tröscher is the daughter of Tassilo Tröscher.

== Literature ==
- Rudolf Vierhaus, Ludolf Herbst (ed.), Bruno Jahn (co-ed.): Biographisches Handbuch der Mitglieder des Deutschen Bundestages. 1949–2002. Vol. 2: N-Z. Appendix. K. G. Saur, Munich 2002, ISBN 3-598-23782-0, p. 885.
