= Patricia Lips =

German politician (born 1963)

Patricia Lips MdB
- Lips in 2020

Member of the Bundestag; from Hesse
- Incumbent
- Assumed office 17 October 2002
- Constituency: State list (2002–2005); Odenwald (2005–2021); State list (2021–2025); Odenwald (2025–present)

Personal details
- Born: 21 December 1963 (age 62) Milan, Italy
- Party: Christian Democratic Union

Patricia Lips (born 21 December 1963) is a German politician of the Christian Democratic Union (CDU) who has been serving as a member of the Bundestag for Odenwald in the state of Hesse since 2002.

== Political career ==
Lips first became a member of the Bundestag in the 2002 German federal election. She served on the Finance Committee from 2004 until 2013 and later chaired the Committee for Education, Research and Technology Assessment from 2014 until 2017.

Following the 2018 elections, Lips became a member of the Budget Committee – where she was her parliamentary group's rapporteur on the annual budget of the Federal Government Commissioner for Culture and Media – and of its so-called Confidential Committee (Vertrauensgremium), which provides budgetary supervision for Germany's three intelligence services, BND, BfV and MAD.

From March 2020 to January 2021, Lips managed the campaign of Friedrich Merz in the 2021 CDU leadership election.

Since 2021, Lips has been serving as one her parliamentary group's deputy chairs, under the leadership of successive chairs Ralph Brinkhaus (2021–2022), Friedrich Merz (2022–2025) and Jens Spahn (since 2025). In this capacity, she oversees the group's legislative activities on European affairs and human rights. In addition, she has been a member of the German delegation to the Franco-German Parliamentary Assembly since 2022.

In the negotiations to form a Grand Coalition under the leadership of Merz's Christian Democrats (CDU together with the Bavarian CSU) and the Social Democrats (SPD) following the 2025 German elections, Lips led the CDU delegation in the working group on European affairs; her counterparts from the other parties were Alexander Radwan and Katarina Barley.

== Other activities ==
- Leibniz Association, Member of the Senate (since 2021)

== Political positions ==
In June 2017, Lips voted against Germany's introduction of same-sex marriage.
