= Mühltal =

- Municipality
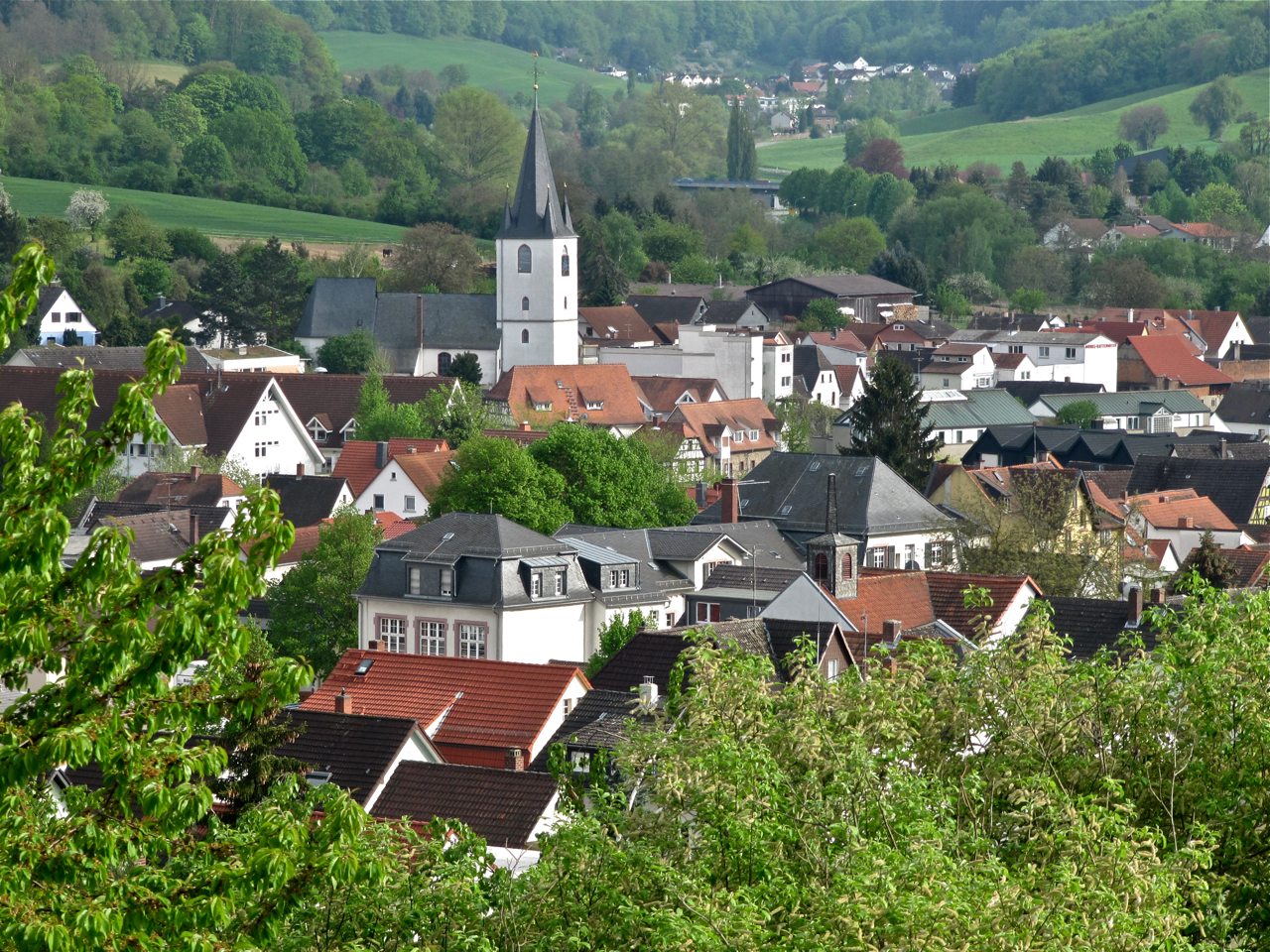
- Nieder-Ramstadt

- Coat of arms

- Location of Mühltal within Darmstadt-Dieburg district
- Interactive map of Mühltal
- Location within Germany Location within Hesse
- Coordinates: 49°48′N 08°42′E
- Country: Germany
- State: Hesse
- Admin. region: Darmstadt
- District: Darmstadt-Dieburg
- Subdivisions: 7 Ortsteile

Government
  - Mayor (2024–30): Niels Starke (CDU)

Area
  - Total: 25.34 km^{2} (9.78 sq mi)
- Elevation: 100–400 m (330–1,310 ft)

Population (2025-12-31)
  - Total: 13,839
  - Density: 546.1/km^{2} (1,414/sq mi)
- Time zone: UTC+01:00 (CET)
  - Summer (DST): UTC+02:00 (CEST)
- Postal codes: 64355–64367
- Dialling codes: 06151, 06154 und 06167
- Vehicle registration: DA
- Website: www.muehltal.de

Mühltal (German pronunciation: [ˈmyːltaːl]) is a municipality in the district of Darmstadt-Dieburg, which is located in Hesse, Germany. It is situated southeast of Darmstadt from which it is separated by the Stadtwald (City Forest).

Historically, there have been many watermills on Modau river and its tributaries. This gave rise to the name Mühltal ("Mill Valley, Mill Dale"), a district through which the river flows.

== Notable people ==
- Karl Ferdinand Abt (1903–1945) - Nazi politician
- Johann Konrad Dippel (1673–1734) - theologian and alchemist
- Klaus Johannes Sprockamp (1959-2001) - chief financial officer of LION Bioscience AG, victim of the September 11 attacks
