= Münster, Hesse =

Münster
- Municipality
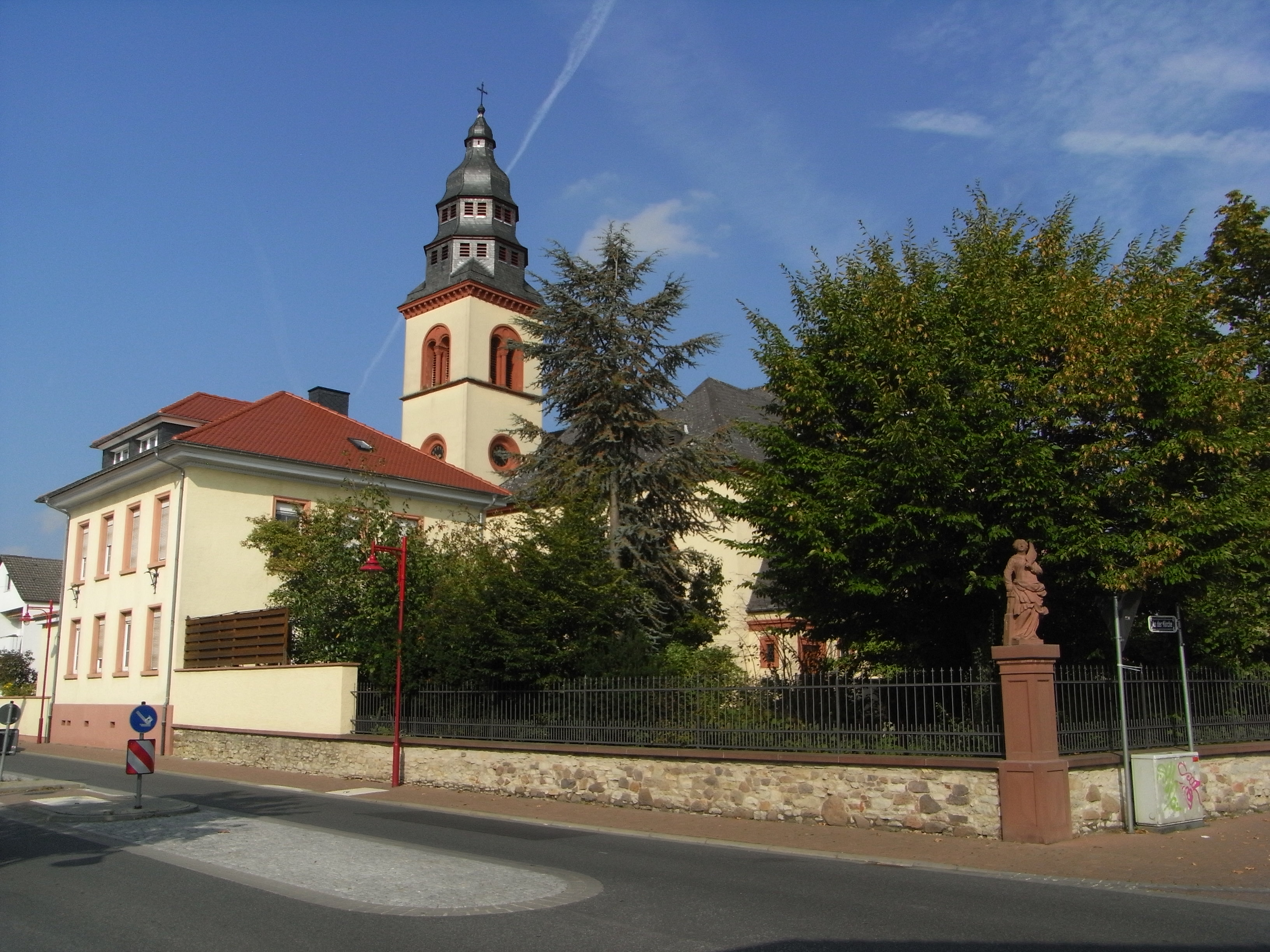
- Saint Michael Church

- Coat of arms

- Location of Münster within Darmstadt-Dieburg district
- Interactive map of Münster
- Location within Germany Location within Hesse
- Coordinates: 49°55′N 08°52′E
- Country: Germany
- State: Hesse
- Admin. region: Darmstadt
- District: Darmstadt-Dieburg

Government
  - Mayor (2020–26): Joachim Schledt (CDU)

Area
  - Total: 20.78 km^{2} (8.02 sq mi)
- Elevation: 137 m (449 ft)

Population (2025-12-31)
  - Total: 14,657
  - Density: 705.3/km^{2} (1,827/sq mi)
- Time zone: UTC+01:00 (CET)
  - Summer (DST): UTC+02:00 (CEST)
- Postal codes: 64839
- Dialling codes: 06071
- Vehicle registration: DA
- Website: www.muenster-hessen.de

Münster (German pronunciation: [ˈmʏnstɐ]) is a municipality in the district of Darmstadt-Dieburg, Hessen, Germany. It has a population of 14,610 (as of 2016). It is situated 3 km north of Dieburg, and 24 km southeast of Frankfurt. The town was first mentioned in documents over 750 years ago. In 1971 the adjacent town of Altheim agreed to become part of Münster.
