= Groß-Umstadt =

- Town
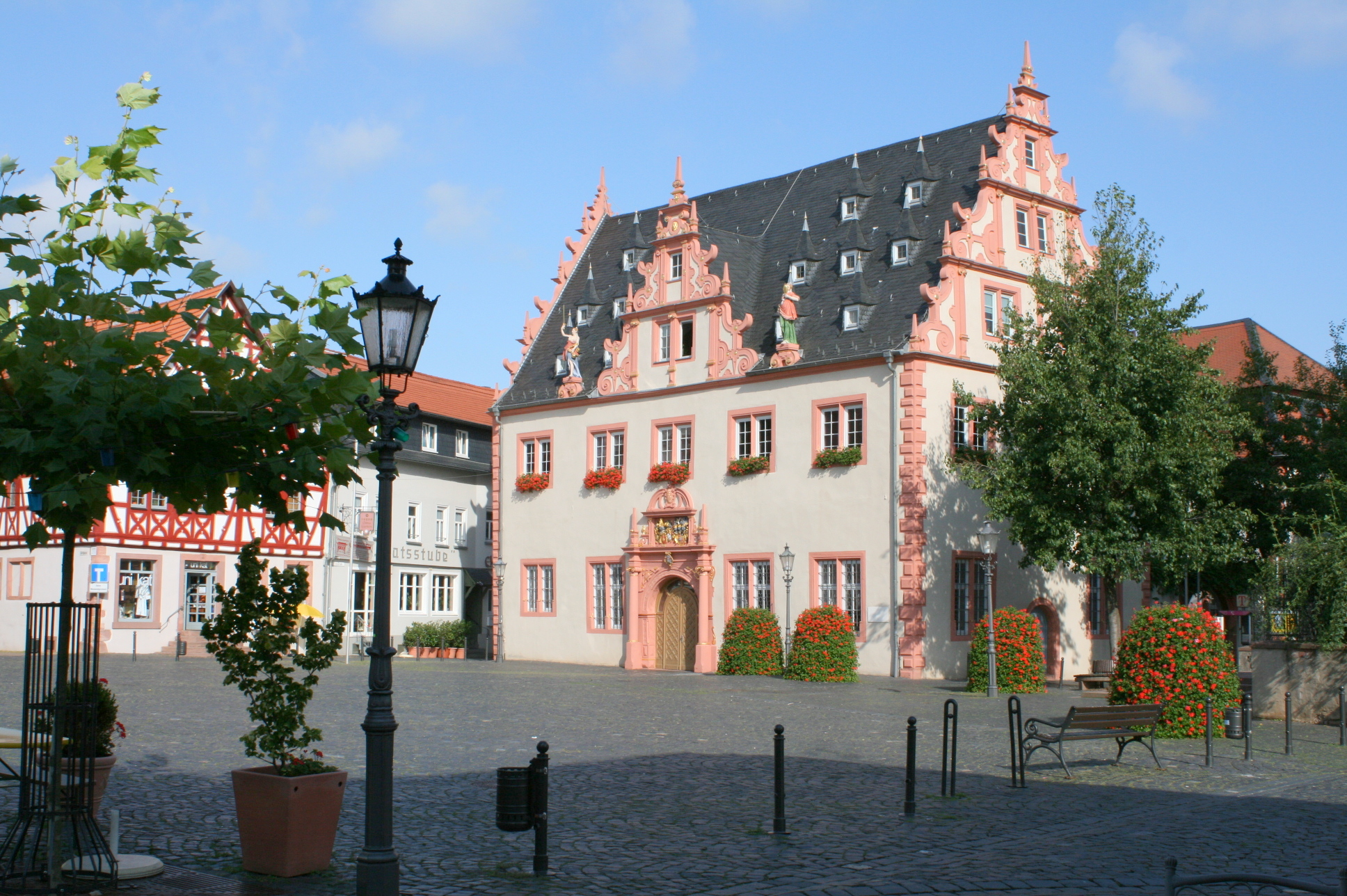
- Town hall

- Coat of arms

- Location of Groß-Umstadt within Darmstadt-Dieburg district
- Interactive map of Groß-Umstadt
- Location within Germany Location within Hesse
- Coordinates: 49°52′N 08°56′E
- Country: Germany
- State: Hesse
- Admin. region: Darmstadt
- District: Darmstadt-Dieburg

Government
  - Mayor (2022–28): René Kirch

Area
  - Total: 86.84 km^{2} (33.53 sq mi)
- Elevation: 170–224 m (558–735 ft)

Population (2025-12-31)
  - Total: 21,171
  - Density: 243.8/km^{2} (631.4/sq mi)
- Time zone: UTC+01:00 (CET)
  - Summer (DST): UTC+02:00 (CEST)
- Postal codes: 64823
- Dialling codes: 06078
- Vehicle registration: DA, DI
- Website: www.gross-umstadt.de

Groß-Umstadt (German pronunciation: [ɡʁoːs ˈʔʊmʃtat], lit. 'Great Umstadt', in contrast to "Little Umstadt") is a town in the district of Darmstadt-Dieburg in the Bundesland (federal state) of Hesse in Germany. It is near Darmstadt and Frankfurt, in the southeastern part of the Rhine-Main Metropolitan Region, just north of the Odenwald mountain range.

The population is about 21,000. Half of them live in Groß-Umstadt itself, the remainder in eight other districts which were incorporated by the Hesse State Municipal Reform Act in the 1970s:

- Dorndiel
- Heubach
- Kleestadt
- Klein-Umstadt
- Raibach
- Richen
- Semd
- Wiebelsbach (also includes village Frau-Nauses).

== History ==
Traces of palaeolithic habitation have been identified outside the town.

The settlement of Civitas Auderiensium was founded at Dieburg in AD 125 in the context of the Roman occupation of the section of the province of Germania Superior on the right bank of the Rhine. The foundation was followed by an orderly settlement and Romanisation of the district, and a market for agricultural produce was established. The main building of a Roman villa rustica has been excavated under the current town church. This villa remained until the collapse of the Alemanni around AD 300. The town's history over the following 450 years until the first documentary evidence of the town is unclear. Alemannic and later Frankish tombs point to a settlement in the area of the town. The siting of the church in the core area of the former villa indicates an uninterrupted settlement, or at least to awareness of the previous settlement.

=== Early mediaeval period ===
After the conquest of Alemannic territory by the Franks, they established royal fortifications in order to secure control of the area. One such was undoubtedly established in Umstadt, the center of government of the Umstaedter Mark, which included the current municipalities of Otzberg, Höchst im Odenwald, Breuberg and Schaafheim as well as Umstadt itself. At that time Umstadt had the status of a market town as well as a church and the seat of a Count. The first documentary evidence of the district was in 743 under the name of "Autmundisstat", which signified "Autmund's town" (possibly Edmund's). Another possible origin of the name is "ad montes" (near the mountains). In 766 Princely Abbey of Fulda acquired the ownership of the Umstaedter Mark, and by 985 it owned three churches, mills and vineyards here.

=== Late mediaeval period ===
By 1263 or earlier, Umstadt had obtained town privileges as well as a town wall.

Konrad IV of Hanau incurred substantial debts in connection with his election as Prince Abbot of Fulda in 1373. He attempted to recoup these debts from the Princely abbey of Fulda after he came to power. Thus in 1374 he mortgaged the Otzberg Castle, the town of Hering and parts of Umstadt to his nephew Ulrich IV for 23,875 guilders (florins). Other parts were taken over by Electoral Palatinate, resulting in a condominium. There is physical evidence for this in two palaces: the Hanau Palace (German: Hanauer Schloss) which originated from the first moated palace at the town's NE corner, and the Palatinate Palace (German: Pfälzer Schloss) at the opposite corner. Between these were the mansions of the burghers of the town, including the seat of the Wambolts of Umstadt, which soon eclipsed the palaces of both lords of the town.

=== Early modern period ===
In 1504 the town was conquered by Landgrave Wilhelm II of Hesse, who occupied it until the ownership of the town was clarified by the Diet of Worms in 1521. This resulted in another condominium, this time between Hesse and the Palatinate. As compensation Hanau received 12,000 guilders and several nearby villages, viz. Harpertshausen, Kleestadt, Langstadt and Schlierbach.

Under this common ownership the town developed until shortly before the Thirty Years' War; the still extant town hall was built from 1596.

During the war the town was protected by its strong fortifications, preventing major destruction, but nevertheless there was great suffering, not least during the plague in 1634–36.

The town was briefly occupied and laid waste by a force of 600 dragoons under the Marquis of Barbistere in December 1688 during the War of the Palatine Succession.

=== 19th and 20th centuries ===
In 1802 the Landgraviate of Hesse-Darmstadt took over the joint dominion of the town, which was the 2nd most important town of the district of Dieburg which was founded at that time. From 1857 the town adopted the name of Gross-Umstadt to distinguish it from Klein-Umstadt and Wenigumstadt. Many factories were established in the town after it obtained a railway connection.

In the election of 1933, 60% of the inhabitants voted for the Nazis, and in 1938 the town's synagogue was desecrated. After WW2 the town's population grew to about 22,500 following several expansions to its boundaries. There is now a substantial Portuguese community.

== Population Growth ==
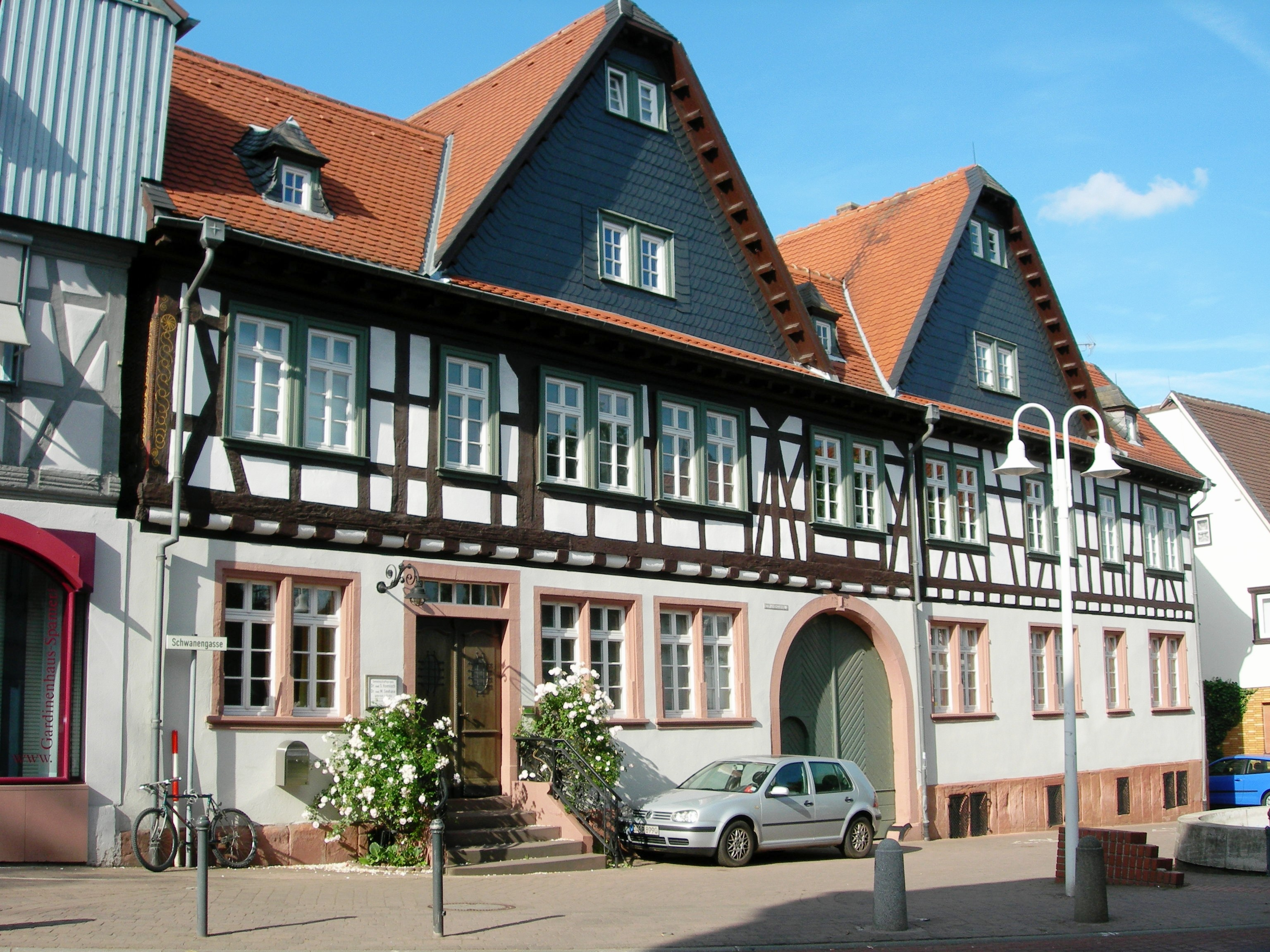
Wooden framed homes on Schwanengasse

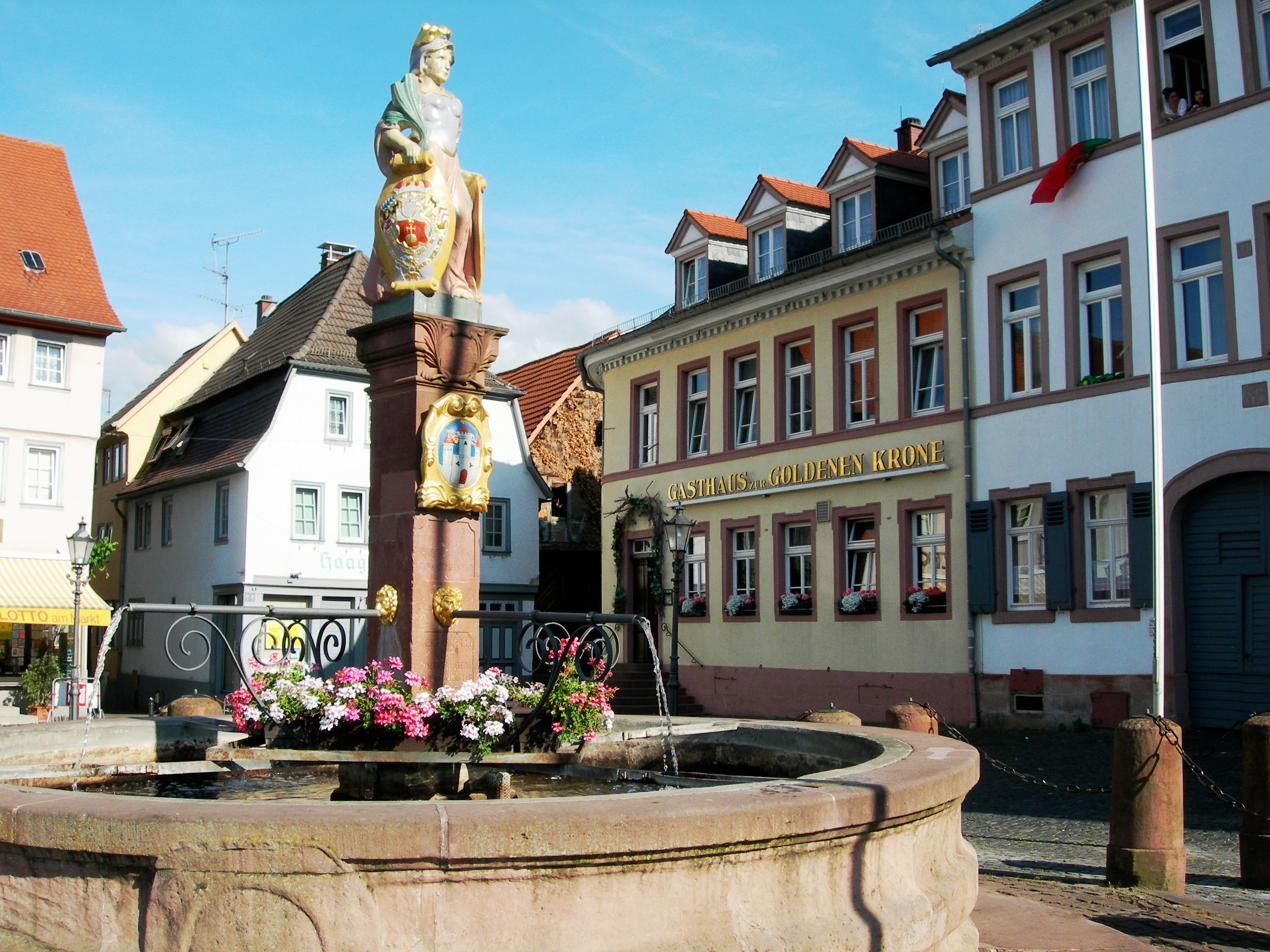
Marketplace

=== Groß-Umstadt (excluding the 8 other districts) ===
- 800 - 100
- 985 - 200
- 1604 - 1,000
- 1636 - 424
- 1816 - 2,780
- 1905 - 3,580
- 1945 - 4,500
- 1990 - 9,087

=== After their inclusion ===
(December 31)

- 1998 - 21,175
- 1999 - 21,338
- 2000 - 21,403
- 2001 - 21,571
- 2002 - 21,620
- 2003 - 21,685
- 2004 - 21,724
- 2005 - 22,600
- 2025 + 2

== Mayors ==
- 1945–1954: Peter Hartmann (SPD) (1888–1969)
- 1954–1965: Ludwig Wedel (SPD) (1909–1993)
- 1969–1988: Hugo Seibert (independent) (1925–2011)
- 1988–2005: Wilfried Köbler (SPD)
- 2006-2021: Joachim Ruppert (SPD) (1962–2021)
- 2022–2028: René Kirch (independent)

== Culture ==
Each year on the second weekend of September there is a "Winzerfest" (a wine festival) which attracts tens of thousands of people.

== Infrastructure ==
Groß-Umstadt has schools for students of all ages and a general hospital.

The city is connected to the Odenwald Railway and has three train stations: Groß-Umstadt Wiebelsbach, Groß-Umstadt Mitte and Groß-Umstadt Klein-Umstadt. Trains running between Frankfurt/Hanau and Eberbach stop at these stations, while trains running between Darmstadt and Eberbach only stop at Groß-Umstadt Wiebelsbach.

== Partner cities ==
- Saint-Péray (France; since 1966)
- Santo Tirso (Portugal; since 1988)
- Dicomano (Italy; since 2010)

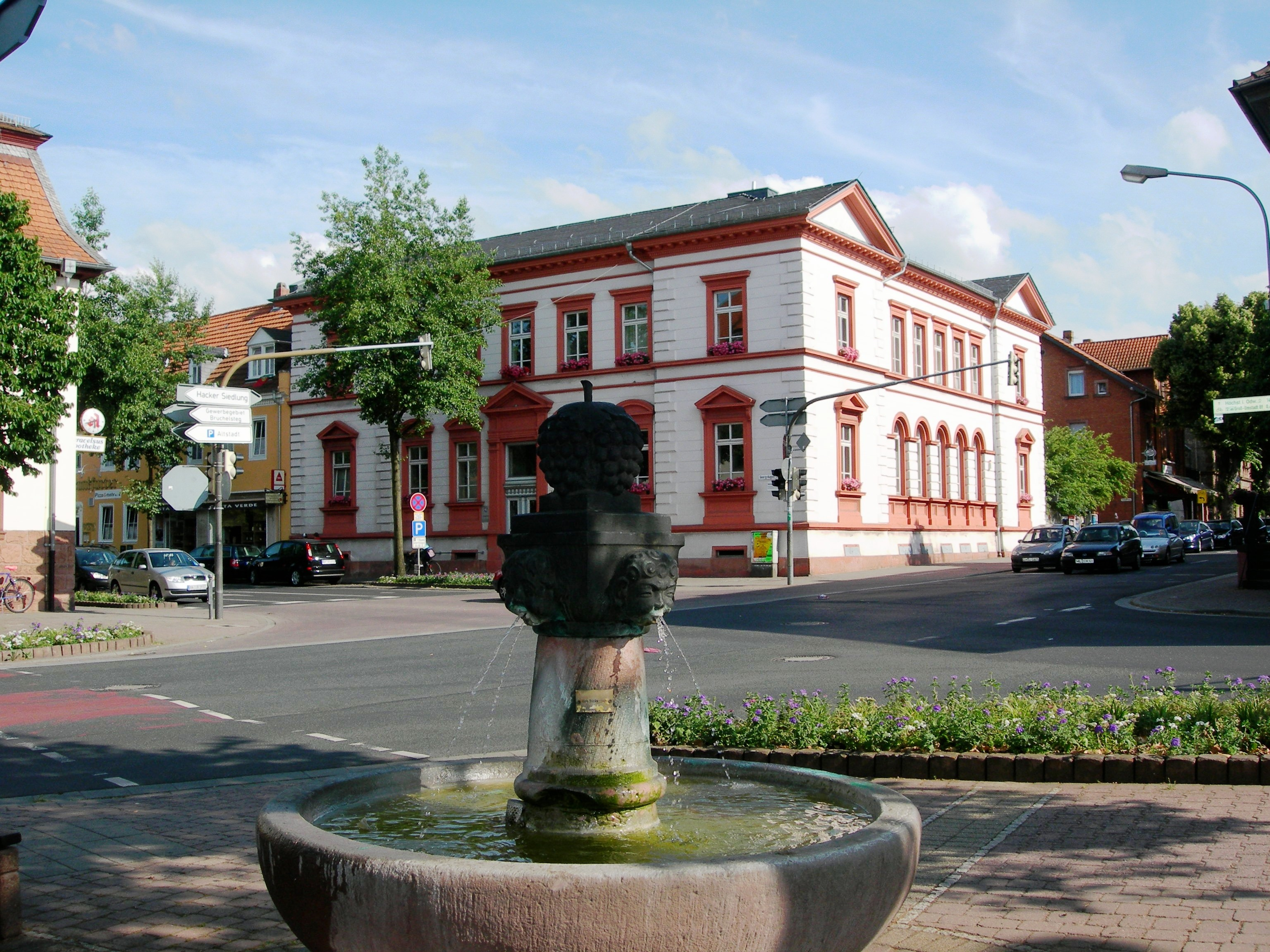
County Court

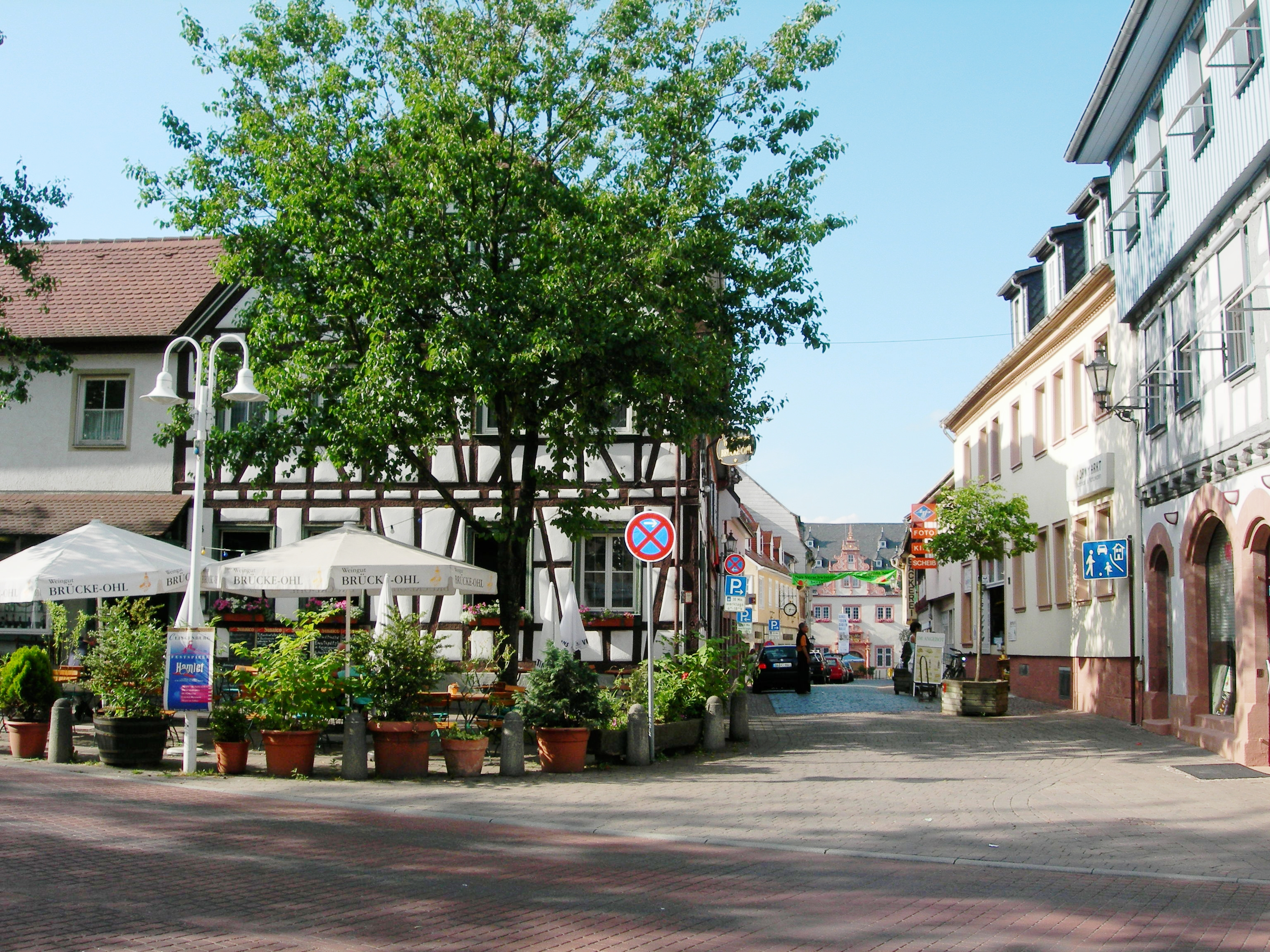
The historic winebar Brücke-Ohl.

== Notable people ==
- Otto Frank (physiologist) (1865–1944), physiologist
- Hans Trippel (1908–2001), German autoconstructor ("father of the amphibious vehicles"), entangled crimes of national socialism
