= Reinheim =

- Town
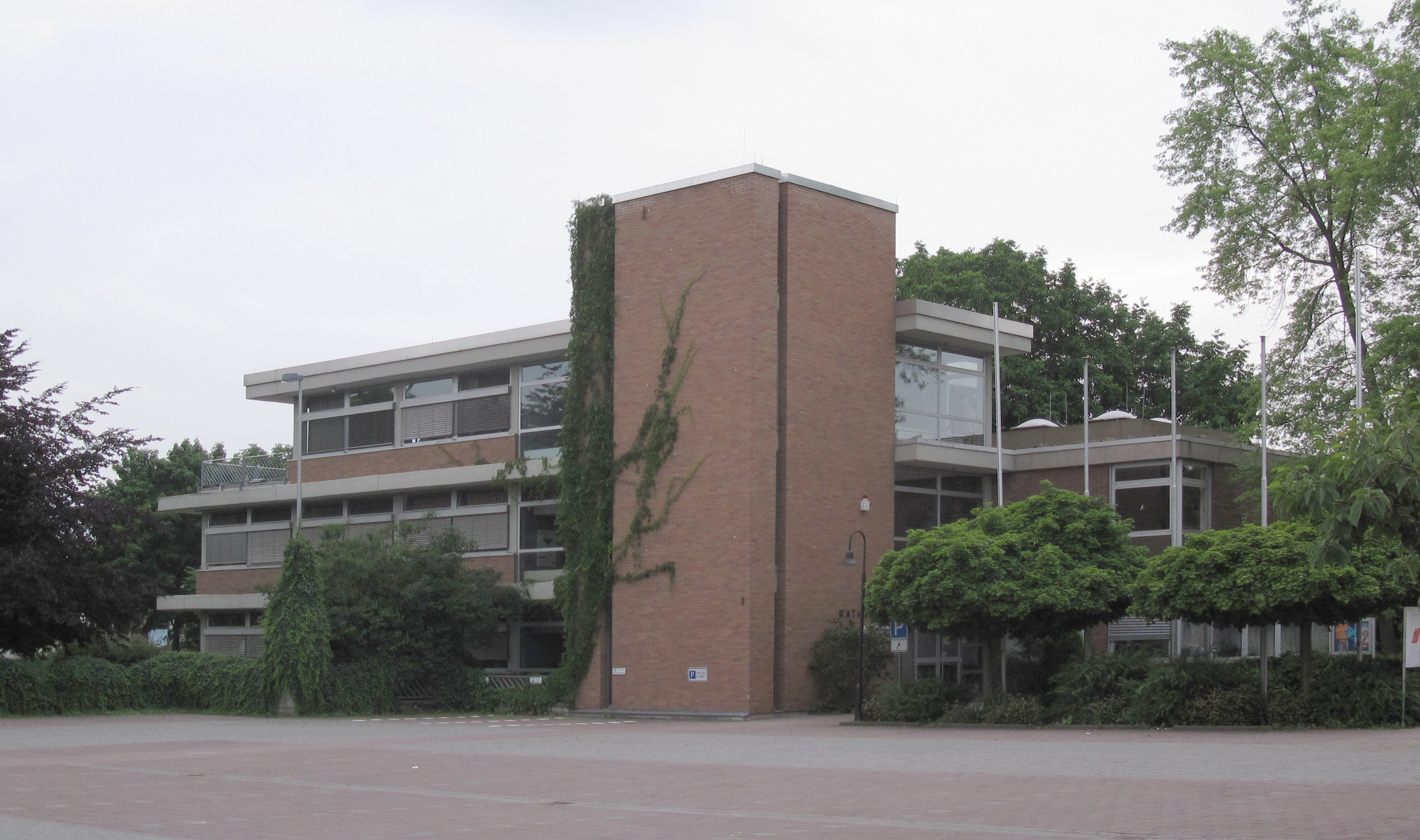
- Town hall

- Coat of arms

- Location of Reinheim within Darmstadt-Dieburg district
- Interactive map of Reinheim
- Location within Germany Location within Hesse
- Coordinates: 49°49′37″N 8°49′51″E
- Country: Germany
- State: Hesse
- Admin. region: Darmstadt
- District: Darmstadt-Dieburg

Government
  - Mayor (2019–25): Manuel Feick (SPD)

Area
  - Total: 27.7 km^{2} (10.7 sq mi)
- Elevation: 165 m (541 ft)

Population (2025-12-31)
  - Total: 16,372
  - Density: 591/km^{2} (1,530/sq mi)
- Time zone: UTC+01:00 (CET)
  - Summer (DST): UTC+02:00 (CEST)
- Postal codes: 64348–64354
- Dialling codes: 06162
- Vehicle registration: DA
- Website: www.reinheim.de

Reinheim (German pronunciation: [ˈʁaɪnˌhaɪm]) is a town in the Darmstadt-Dieburg district, in Hesse, Germany. It is situated 14 kilometres (9 miles) southeast of Darmstadt.

== International relations ==
=== Twin towns - Sister cities ===
Reinheim is twinned with:

- Licata, Italy (since 29.6.2001)
- Cestas, France (since 1982)
- Fürstenwalde (Spree), Germany (since 1989)
- Sanok, Poland (since 1991)

== Districts ==
Reinheim consist of Reinheim, Spachbrücken, Ueberau, Georgenhausen and Zeilhard, there are three small housing areas called Hundertmorgen, Dilshofen and Orscheläcker. Orscheläcker is a part of Spachbrücken, Hundertmorgen and Dilshofen are not a part of Reinheim, but they affiliate magistrate Reinheim.

== Transport ==
Reinheim has had a railway station since 1871 and bus.

== Personalities ==
- Julius Scriba (1848-1905), physician and botanist
- Julius Scriba (1866-1937), pharmacist
- Wilhelm von Willich von Pöllnitz (1807-1887), administrative officer and deputy of the 1st and 2nd chamber of the provinces of the Grand Duchy of Hesse
