= Modau =

River in Darmstadt, Germany

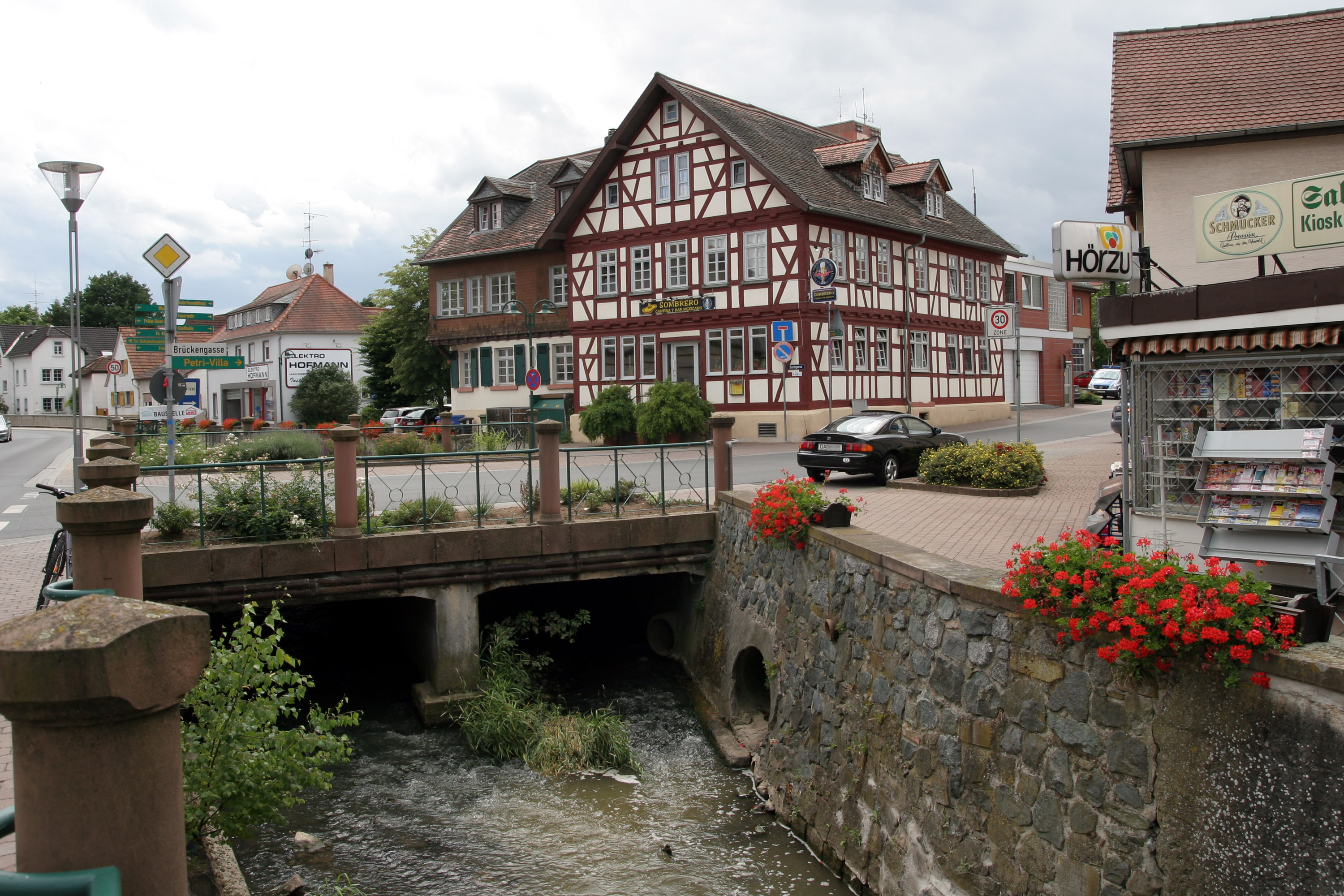
- The Modau running through the town of Darmstadt and Ober-Ramstadt

Location
- Country: Germany
- State: Hesse

Physical characteristics
- Source
  - coordinates: 49°43′56.7″N 8°46′12.4″E
  - elevation: 491 m (1,611 ft)
- Mouth
  - coordinates: 49°48′50″N 8°27′52″E
  - elevation: 84 m (276 ft)
- Length: 44.1 km (27.4 mi)
- Basin size: 205 km^{2} (79 sq mi)

Basin features
- Progression: Rhine→ North Sea

The Modau (German pronunciation: [ˈmoːdaʊ]) is a 44-kilometre-long (27 mi) right tributary of the river Rhine running through the German state of Hesse. Historically, there have been many watermills on the river and its tributaries, giving rise to the name Mühltal ("Mill Valley"), a district through which the river flows. It passes through Darmstadt-Eberstadt, and Ober-Ramstadt, and Pfungstadt, and flows into a branch of the Rhine in Stockstadt am Rhein.

== Erosion ==
Due to erosion of the river, it was needed to place various stones into the channel bed of the river to prevent abrasion, hydraulic action and early attrition

== See also ==
- List of rivers of Hesse
