= Groß-Bieberau =

- Town
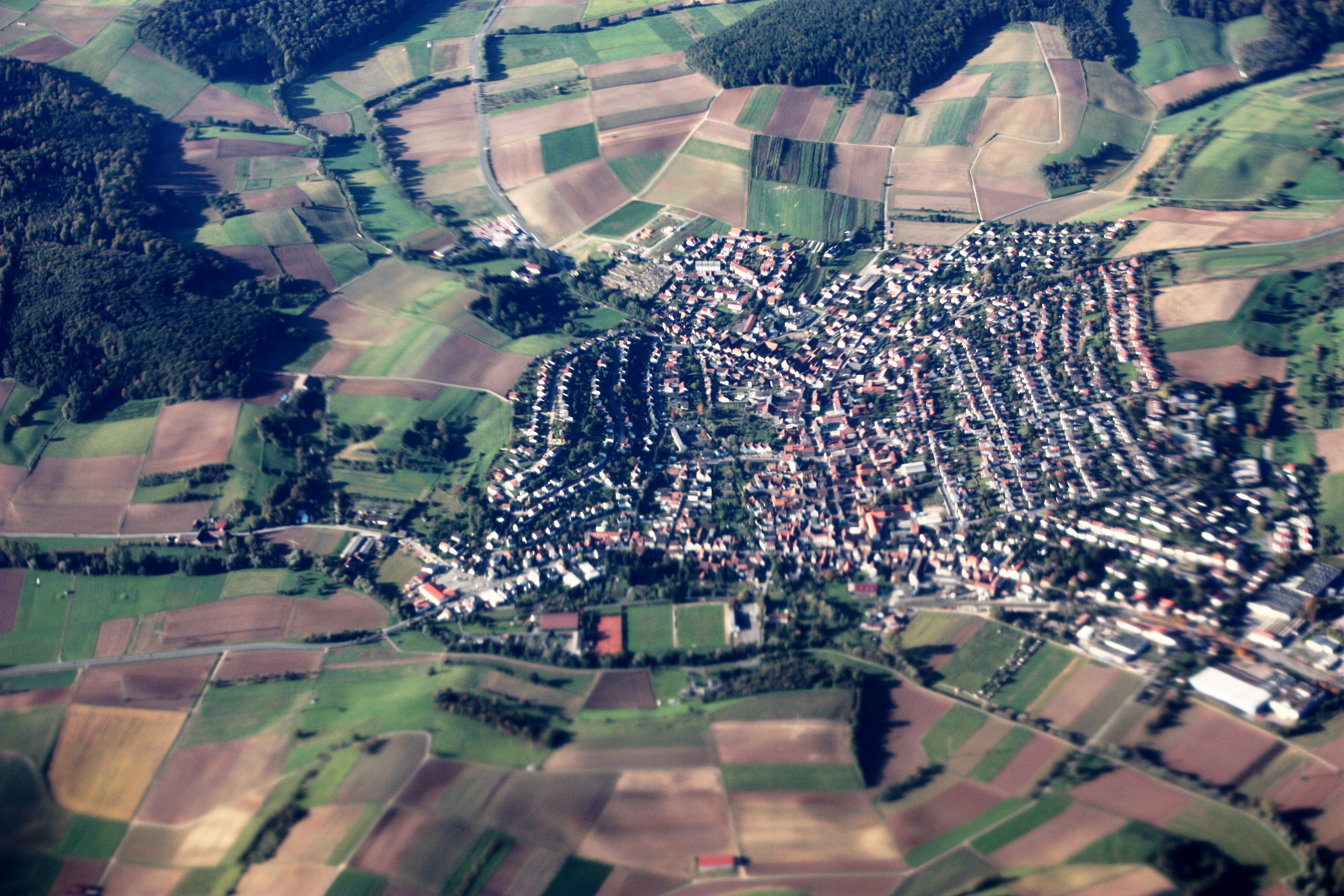
- Aerial view

- Coat of arms

- Location of Groß-Bieberau within Darmstadt-Dieburg district
- Interactive map of Groß-Bieberau
- Location within Germany Location within Hesse
- Coordinates: 49°48′N 08°50′E
- Country: Germany
- State: Hesse
- Admin. region: Darmstadt
- District: Darmstadt-Dieburg

Government
  - Mayor (2020–26): Anja Dorothea Vogt (FW)

Area
  - Total: 18.27 km^{2} (7.05 sq mi)
- Elevation: 182 m (597 ft)

Population (2025-12-31)
  - Total: 4,486
  - Density: 245.5/km^{2} (635.9/sq mi)
- Time zone: UTC+01:00 (CET)
  - Summer (DST): UTC+02:00 (CEST)
- Postal codes: 64398–64401
- Dialling codes: 06162
- Vehicle registration: DA
- Website: www.gross-bieberau.de

Groß-Bieberau (German pronunciation: [ɡʁoːs ˈbiːbəʁaʊ], lit. 'Big Bieberau', in contrast to "Little Bieberau") is a town in the Darmstadt-Dieburg district, in Hesse, Germany. It is situated 15 km southeast of Darmstadt. It has several sister cities.
