= Groß-Zimmern =

Municipality in Hesse, Germany

- Municipality
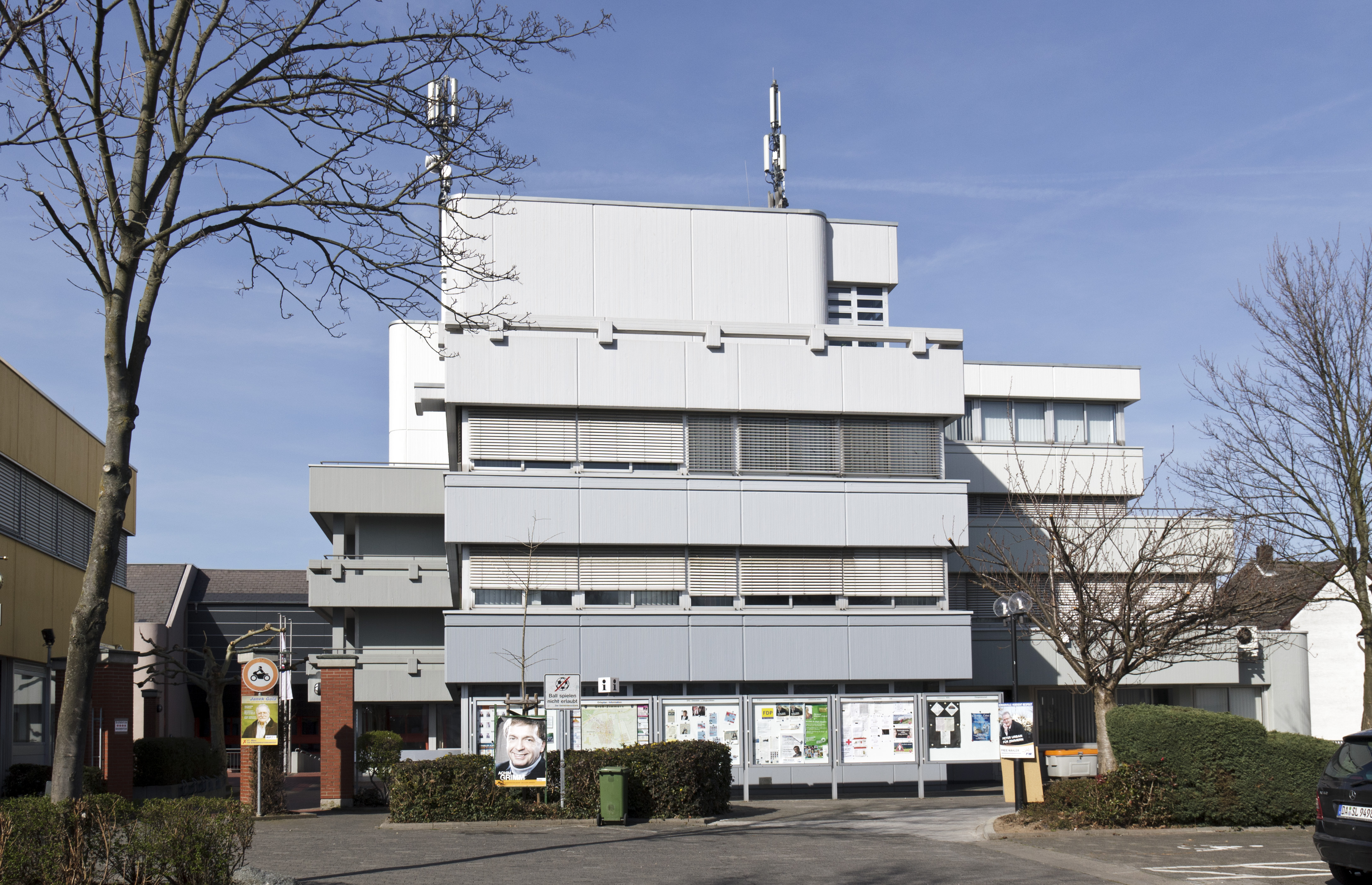
- Town hall

- Coat of arms

- Location of Groß-Zimmern within Darmstadt-Dieburg district
- Interactive map of Groß-Zimmern
- Location within Germany Location within Hesse
- Coordinates: 49°53′N 08°50′E
- Country: Germany
- State: Hesse
- Admin. region: Darmstadt
- District: Darmstadt-Dieburg

Government
  - Mayor (2023–29): Mark Pullmann (CDU)

Area
  - Total: 21.26 km^{2} (8.21 sq mi)
- Elevation: 150 m (490 ft)

Population (2025-12-31)
  - Total: 14,652
  - Density: 689.2/km^{2} (1,785/sq mi)
- Time zone: UTC+01:00 (CET)
  - Summer (DST): UTC+02:00 (CEST)
- Postal codes: 64846
- Dialling codes: 06071
- Vehicle registration: DA
- Website: www.gross-zimmern.de

Groß-Zimmern (German pronunciation: [ɡʁoːs ˈtsɪmɐn], lit. 'Big Zimmern', in contrast to "Little Zimmern") is a municipality in the district of Darmstadt-Dieburg, in Hessen, Germany. It is situated 10 kilometres (6.2 mi) east of Darmstadt and right next to Dieburg.

In 1846, over 700 town residents emigrated in the Great Migration to New York City. The town paid for the passage of 674 passengers and about 100 more paid their own way. The emigrants sailed on at least five ships – the Atlas (46%), the Sardinia (37%), the Manchester (6%), the Montezuma (7%), and the Pontiac (6%). 425 of the emigrants had no funds or food when they landed in New York city and entered the Bellevue Almshouse which overloaded the capacity of the Almshouse. New York City petitioned the US Congress to pass laws that would prevent the arrival of paupers on overcrowded ships to the United States.
