= Schaafheim =

- Municipality
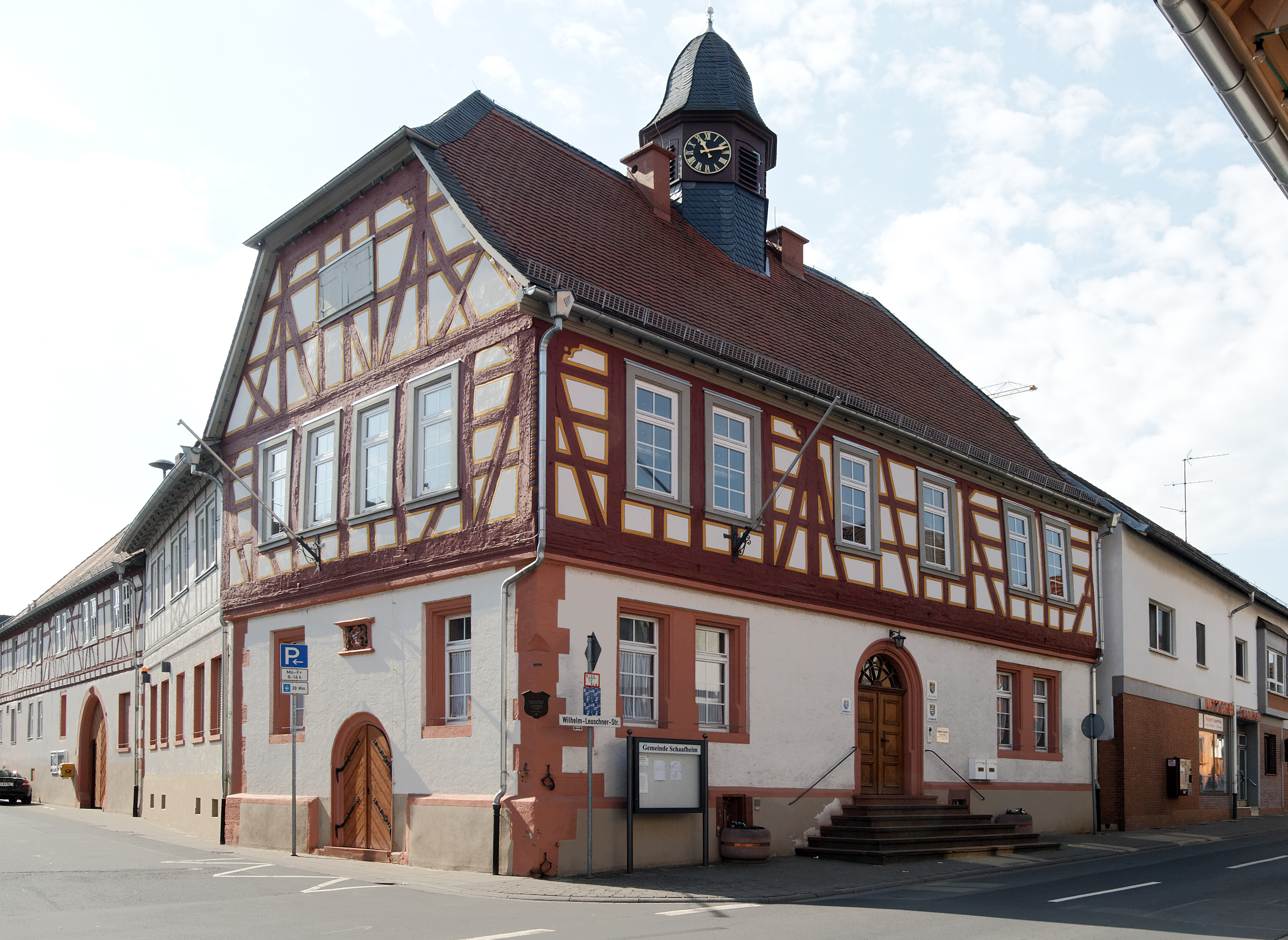
- Town hall

- Coat of arms

- Location of Schaafheim within Darmstadt-Dieburg district
- Interactive map of Schaafheim
- Location within Germany Location within Hesse
- Coordinates: 49°55′N 09°01′E
- Country: Germany
- State: Hesse
- Admin. region: Darmstadt
- District: Darmstadt-Dieburg

Government
  - Mayor (2020–26): Daniel Rauschenberger (CDU)

Area
  - Total: 32.16 km^{2} (12.42 sq mi)
- Elevation: 160 m (520 ft)

Population (2025-12-31)
  - Total: 9,079
  - Density: 282.3/km^{2} (731.2/sq mi)
- Time zone: UTC+01:00 (CET)
  - Summer (DST): UTC+02:00 (CEST)
- Postal codes: 64850
- Dialling codes: 06073
- Vehicle registration: DA, DI
- Website: www.schaafheim.de

Schaafheim is a municipality in the Darmstadt-Dieburg district, in Hesse, Germany.
