= Fischbachtal =

- Municipality
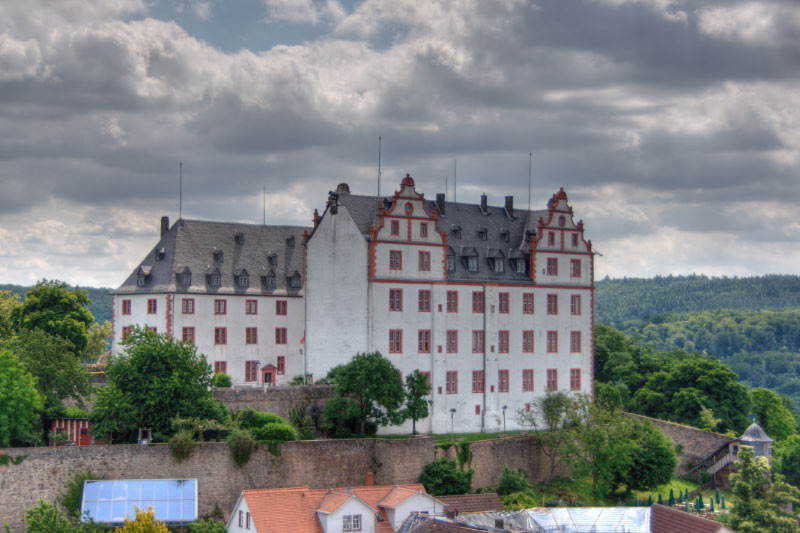
- Lichtenberg Castle

- Coat of arms

- Location of Fischbachtal within Darmstadt-Dieburg district
- Interactive map of Fischbachtal
- Location within Germany Location within Hesse
- Coordinates: 49°46′N 08°47′E
- Country: Germany
- State: Hesse
- Admin. region: Darmstadt
- District: Darmstadt-Dieburg

Government
  - Mayor (2017–23): Philipp Thoma (SPD)

Area
  - Total: 13.27 km^{2} (5.12 sq mi)
- Elevation: 190–348 m (623–1,142 ft)

Population (2025-12-31)
  - Total: 2,692
  - Density: 202.9/km^{2} (525.4/sq mi)
- Time zone: UTC+01:00 (CET)
  - Summer (DST): UTC+02:00 (CEST)
- Postal codes: 64405
- Dialling codes: 06166
- Vehicle registration: DA
- Website: www.fischbachtal.de

Fischbachtal (German pronunciation: [ˈfɪʃbaxˌtaːl], lit. 'Fischbach Valley') is a municipality in southern Hesse (Germany) in the district Darmstadt-Dieburg. The municipality has a total population of 2,686 inhabitants. The current mayor is Philipp Thoma, elected in 2017.

== Geography ==
=== Constituent communities ===
Fischbachtal consists of 6 villages: Billings, Lichtenberg, Meßbach, Niedernhausen (seat of municipal administration), Nonrod und Steinau.
