= Otzberg =

- Municipality
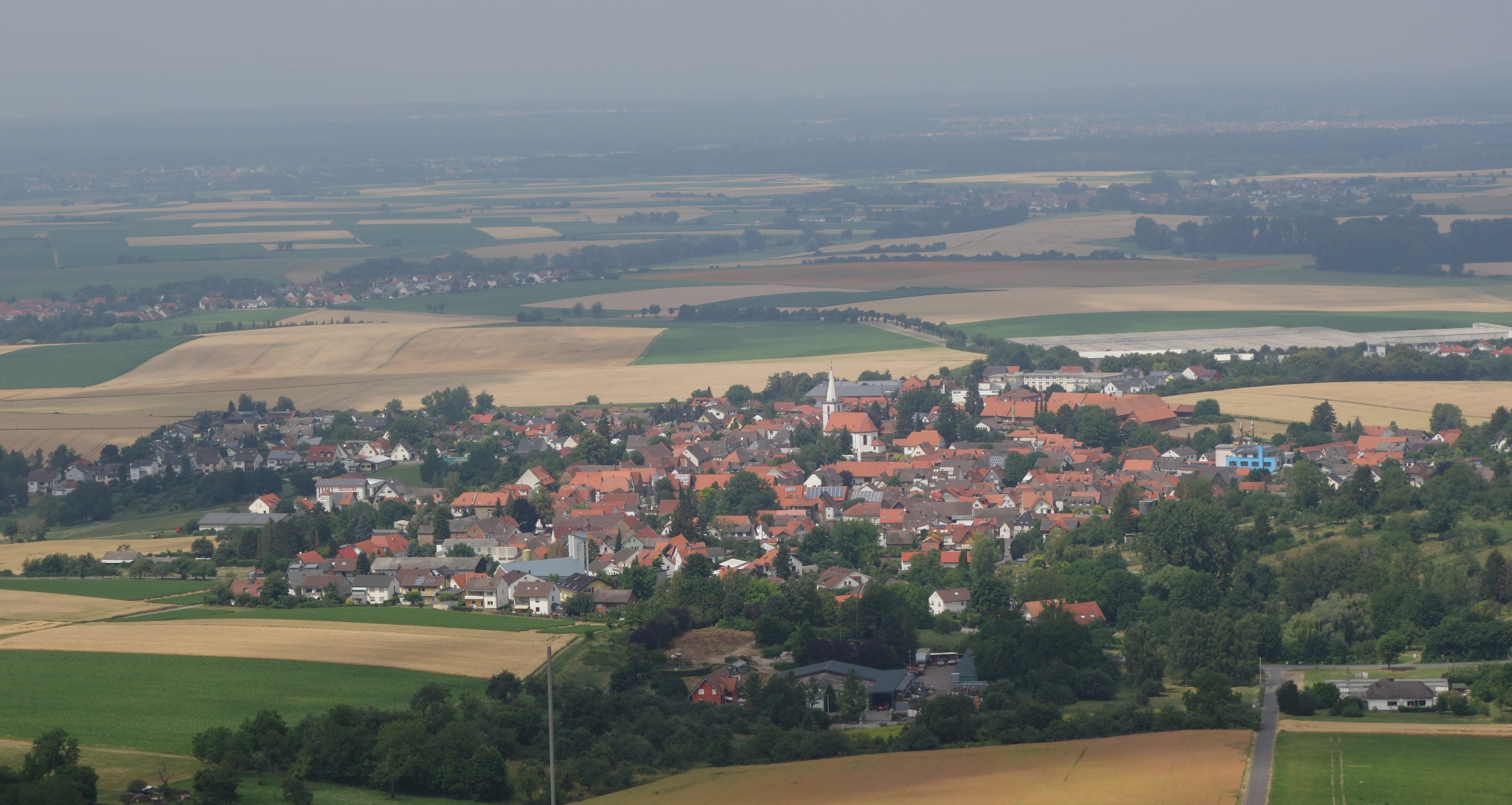
- Lengfeld, seat of the municipal administration, as seen from Otzberg Castle

- Coat of arms

- Location of Otzberg within Darmstadt-Dieburg district
- Interactive map of Otzberg
- Location within Germany Location within Hesse
- Coordinates: 49°50′N 08°55′E
- Country: Germany
- State: Hesse
- Admin. region: Darmstadt
- District: Darmstadt-Dieburg
- Subdivisions: 6 Ortsteile

Government
  - Mayor (2018–24): Matthias Weber

Area
  - Total: 41.95 km^{2} (16.20 sq mi)
- Elevation: 170–367 m (558–1,204 ft)

Population (2025-12-31)
  - Total: 6,291
  - Density: 150.0/km^{2} (388.4/sq mi)
- Time zone: UTC+01:00 (CET)
  - Summer (DST): UTC+02:00 (CEST)
- Postal codes: 64853
- Dialling codes: 06162, 06163
- Vehicle registration: DA
- Website: www.otzberg.de

Otzberg is a municipality in the district of Darmstadt-Dieburg, located in the Odenwald forest region of Germany. It was founded in 1972 by the merger of six former independent municipalities.

Otzberg consists of seven villages: Habitzheim, Hering, Lengfeld with Zipfen, Nieder-Klingen, Ober-Klingen and Ober-Nauses, and Schloss-Nauses. Lengfeld is seat of the municipal administration.

One place of interest in Otzberg is its eponymous castle, a medieval fortress that was first mentioned in 1231. It is widely known for its white tower. The castle itself has been slowly reconstructed to resemble its medieval appearance.

== Partners ==
- Lencloître, Département Vienne, France, since 1983
- Langenweißbach, Landkreis Zwickauer Land, Germany, since 1990

== Geography ==
=== Location ===
The town is located in the northern Odenwald in southern Hesse. The Otzberg, an extinct volcano, rises above the village, reaching a height of 367 m above sea level. In clear conditions one can see from here to Frankfurt am Main and the Taunus.

=== Geology ===
The Otzberg is an extinct volcano made of Böllstein gneiss, formed on an old fault zone (the Otzberg column), which continues to the south and separates the eastern Böllsteiner, which is about 50 million years younger than western Bergsträßer Odw.

The Böllstein gneiss and basalt Otzberg caused by large movements of the Earth's crust in two different geological eras:

In the Palaeozoic (Paleozoic) walked the continental drift a southern continent to continent on a north. This collided intervening dwarf-continent and in the Devonian and Carboniferous period (about 380-320 million years ago), the Variscan Mountains to the Odw counts delayed. was already in the history of Böllsteiner gneiss. He emerged from granitic rocks, which have penetrated about 410 million years ago as molten rock from below into older sedimentary rocks. These were common - sunk into deeper areas of the Earth's crust and converted there, at a high temperature pressure to schists and gneisses - a result of the co-thrusts. At the Otzberg column is welded these rocks - in the course of plate collision - with those of the Bergstrasse Odws.

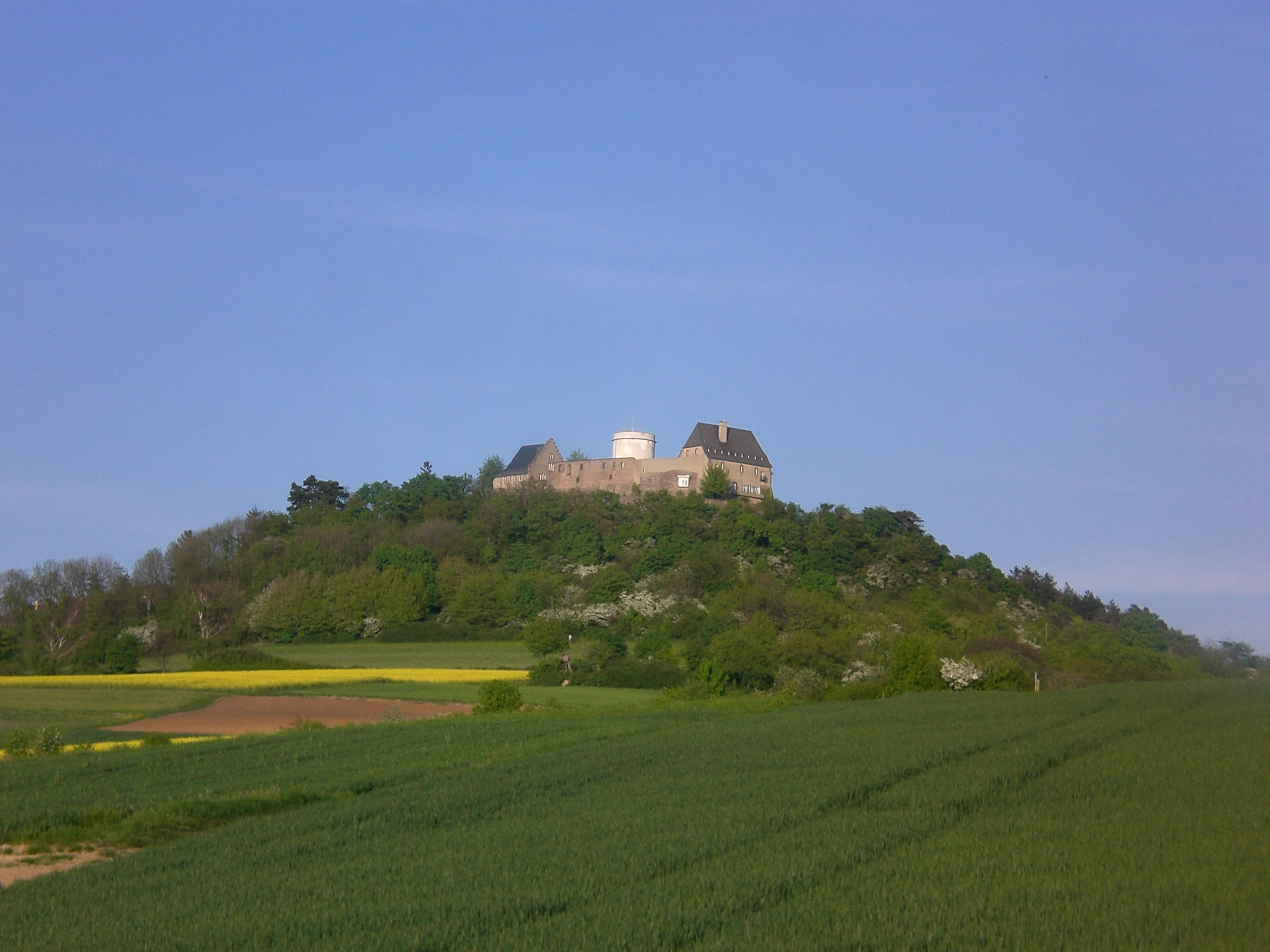
Extinct volcano Otzberg and the old fort Veste Otzberg with the white tower

Many millions of years later, the mountain was already removed down to his torso and powerful Buntsandstein, Muschelkalk, Keuper and law - deposits had altered the landscape, it came in Central Europe back to strong movements in the crust: In connection with a rift zone from the Mediterranean to the North Sea broke - in the Tertiary about 45 million years - the Upper Rhine Graben - and hence the Erbacher-Michelstädter ditch. To the subsidence in the Rhine-Main area also includes the Tire Bay. As a result, many cross dissected and transverse fractures in the area now Odenwald mountain blocks and ditches, so that magma could penetrate to the surface. Were formed in the central and northern Odw approximately 35-20 million years ago volcanoes such as the Otzberg. Some columns were filled with ore-bearing quartz and Schwerspatlösungen.

The Vulcan blankets are now - have been removed by erosion - as well as the Buntsandstein, Muschelkalk, Keuper and Jurassic - deposits. What is left is the basalt columns at Castle Hill - as remnants of the crater fill. The crystalline rock body was exposed again, Rivers cut a valley and then formed the present landscape.

Evidence of its geological past are relics of quarries and mines:

- Basalt quarry on the stone pavement was collected on Otzberg (see basalt columns)
- Feldspar for the porcelain production: in Herring (1880)
- Schwerspatabbau (barite), east of Herring (1870)
- Iron ore mining is documented since 1472: reduction in Schwerspatgang for Zipf and Wiebelsbach (1850) and in quartz-iron-glance south corridors herring.

=== See also ===
→ Odenwald#Geology
