= Darmstadt-Dieburg =

Coordinates: 49°53′55″N 8°40′32″E

- District
- Flag Coat of arms
- Country: Germany
- State: Hesse
- Adm. region: Darmstadt
- Capital: Darmstadt

Government
  - District admin.: Klaus Peter Schellhaas (SPD)

Area
  - Total: 658.51 km^{2} (254.25 sq mi)

Population (31 December 2022)
  - Total: 300,658
  - Density: 460/km^{2} (1,200/sq mi)
- Time zone: UTC+01:00 (CET)
  - Summer (DST): UTC+02:00 (CEST)
- Vehicle registration: DA, DI
- Website: http://www.ladadi.de

Darmstadt-Dieburg is a Kreis (district) in the south of Hesse, Germany. Neighboring districts are Offenbach, Aschaffenburg, Miltenberg, Odenwaldkreis, Bergstraße, Groß-Gerau, and the district-free city of Darmstadt, which it surrounds.

== History ==
The district was created in 1975 by merging the previous districts of Darmstadt and Dieburg. In 1963 the district was twinned with the district of North East Derbyshire, England, in 1990 with the district Zwickauer Land in Saxony, Germany, and in 1995 with the Mladá Boleslav region in the Czech Republic.

== Geography ==
The district is located in the Odenwald mountains. Most famous in the district is the Messel Pit, where many fossils in the oil shale of a Tertiary lake were found. The site is listed in the UNESCO world heritage list since 1995.

== Coat of arms ==
The coat of arms show a lion in the top part, taken from the coat of arms of the counts of Katzenelnbogen. The lion holds a Wheel of Mainz, the symbol of state of Mainz. Both owned big parts of the districts area in the past. The 23 stars in the bottom represent the municipalities of the county.

== Towns and municipalities ==
Clickable map of towns and municipalities in the district

Towns
1. Babenhausen
2. Dieburg
3. Griesheim
4. Groß-Bieberau
5. Groß-Umstadt
6. Ober-Ramstadt
7. Pfungstadt
8. Reinheim
9. Weiterstadt
Municipalities
1. Alsbach-Hähnlein
2. Bickenbach
3. Eppertshausen
4. Erzhausen
5. Fischbachtal
6. Groß-Zimmern
7. Messel

8. Modautal
9. Mühltal
10. Münster
11. Otzberg
12. Roßdorf
13. Schaafheim
14. Seeheim-Jugenheim
