= Bubák =

Bubák is a surname. Notable people with the surname include:

- Alois Bubák (1824–1870), Czech illustrator and landscape painter
- František Bubák (1866–1925), Czech mycologist and phytopathologist

== See also ==
- Sangi Dari Bubak, Iranian village
