= Auer (Odenwald) =

River in Germany

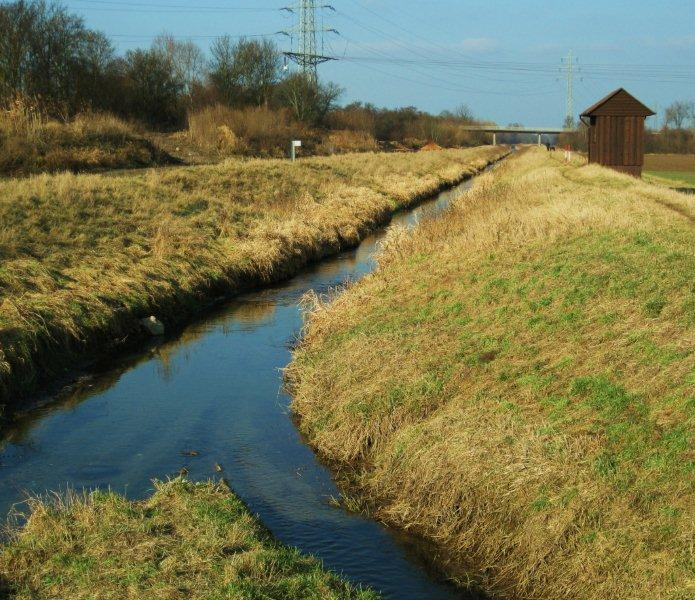
- Mouth of the Auer

- Location of mouth in Hesse

Location
- Country: Germany
- Region: Odenwald
- State: Hesse

Physical characteristics
- Mouth
  - location: Lauter
  - coordinates: 49°42′08″N 8°36′06″E
- Length: 6.7 km (4.2 mi)

Basin features
- Progression: Lauter→ Rhine→ North Sea
- River system: Rhine

The Auer (German pronunciation: [ˈaʊɐ]; also called Mühlbach or Ziegelbach) is a river in Hesse, Germany which springs from the western edge of the Felsberg in the Hessian Odenwald between Balkhausen and Bensheim-Hochstädten. It measures 6.7 kilometers in length and is part of the Rhine river system.

== Mühlbach ==
The Auer has ten tributaries and flows through the Bensheim district of Hochstädten, past the marble factory and the Goethebrunnen (Bensheim) through the valley Mühltal towards Bensheim-Auerbach. In the past, there were seven mills in the Mühltal powered by the Auer's water. Therefore here the brook's vernacular name is Mühlbach (mill brook). The mill in the village's center is nowadays a wine restaurant, another mill is a nursing home, and another mill is the studio and residential house of an Auerbach-based artist. The other four mills (Kadelsmühle, Wiemersmühle, Mößingersmühle and Jungmühle) are used as residential houses.

The Mühltal is bordered to the north by the Auerberg hill along with Auerbach Castle, an old castle ruin, and to the south by the federal park Fürstenlager.

== Auerbach ==
In the district of Bensheim-Auerbach, the Auer is split into two parts, one above ground and the other being a subterranean channel. Because of the recurring floods in the street Bachgasse, the largest part of the Auer was channeled in the 1980s. Like at the antetype Freiburg Bächle, an ever constant part of the Auer flows openly through the Bachgasse, through the old village of Auerbach passing numerous half-timbered buildings towards the Bundesstraße 3 (Darmstädter Straße).

== Ziegelbach ==
After the two streams united again, the Auer crosses the Bundesstraße underground and flows towards the Auerbach railway station. Since around 1850 there was a brick and porcelain factory; there the Auer is also called Ziegelbach (brick brook).

After crossing the railway line Darmstadt-Heidelberg, the Auer reaches after approximately 1 km its mouth. It flows into the Winkelbach coming from Bensheim, which is called upstream of the Auer's mouth Lauter. The Winkelbach flows at Gernsheim into the Rhine.

The total length of the Auer from the source to the mouth is 6.7 km.

== See also ==
- List of rivers of Hesse
