= Lautertal (Odenwald) =

- Municipality
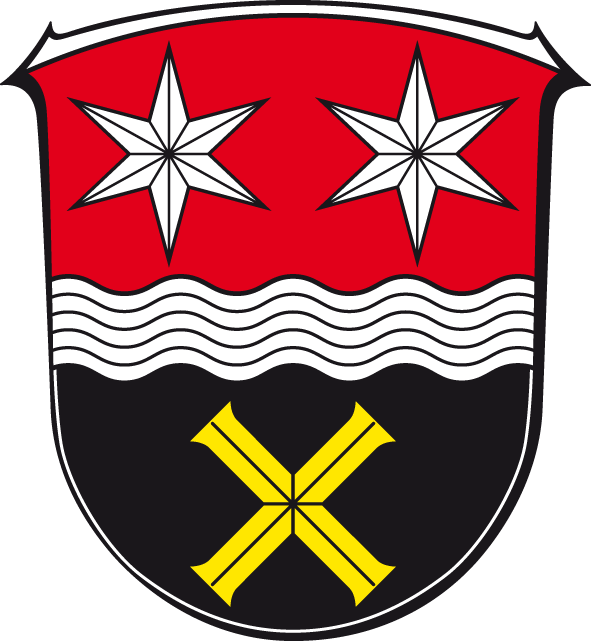
- Coat of arms

- Location of Lautertal within Bergstraße district
- Interactive map of Lautertal
- Location within Germany Location within Hesse
- Coordinates: 49°44′N 8°42′E
- Country: Germany
- State: Hesse
- Admin. region: Darmstadt
- District: Bergstraße

Government
  - Mayor (2017–23): Andreas Heun

Area
  - Total: 30.75 km^{2} (11.87 sq mi)
- Elevation: 200 m (660 ft)

Population (2025-12-31)
  - Total: 7,006
  - Density: 227.8/km^{2} (590.1/sq mi)
- Time zone: UTC+01:00 (CET)
  - Summer (DST): UTC+02:00 (CEST)
- Postal codes: 64686
- Dialling codes: 06254, 06251 (Elmshausen)
- Vehicle registration: HP
- Website: www.lautertal.de

Lautertal (Odenwald) (German pronunciation: [ˈlaʊtɐtaːl], lit. 'Lauter Valley') is a municipality in the Bergstraße district in the Hessian Odenwald in Germany that came into being with the merger of several former communities.

== Geography ==
=== Location ===
The Lauter valley (also called the Lautertal in German) begins near the source of the brook called the Lauter, which is found on the Neunkircher Höhe (“Neunkirchen Heights”). The brook then runs first along a broad streambed, but then gets quite narrow and steep as it approaches the Bergstraße, where the brook's name becomes the Winkelbach once it reaches Bensheim. Furthermore, the valley includes several peaks on both sides.

=== Neighbouring communities ===
Lautertal borders in the north on the communities of Seeheim-Jugenheim and Modautal (Darmstadt-Dieburg), in the east on the town of Lindenfels, in the south on the community of Fürth and the town of Heppenheim and in the west on the town of Bensheim.

== History ==
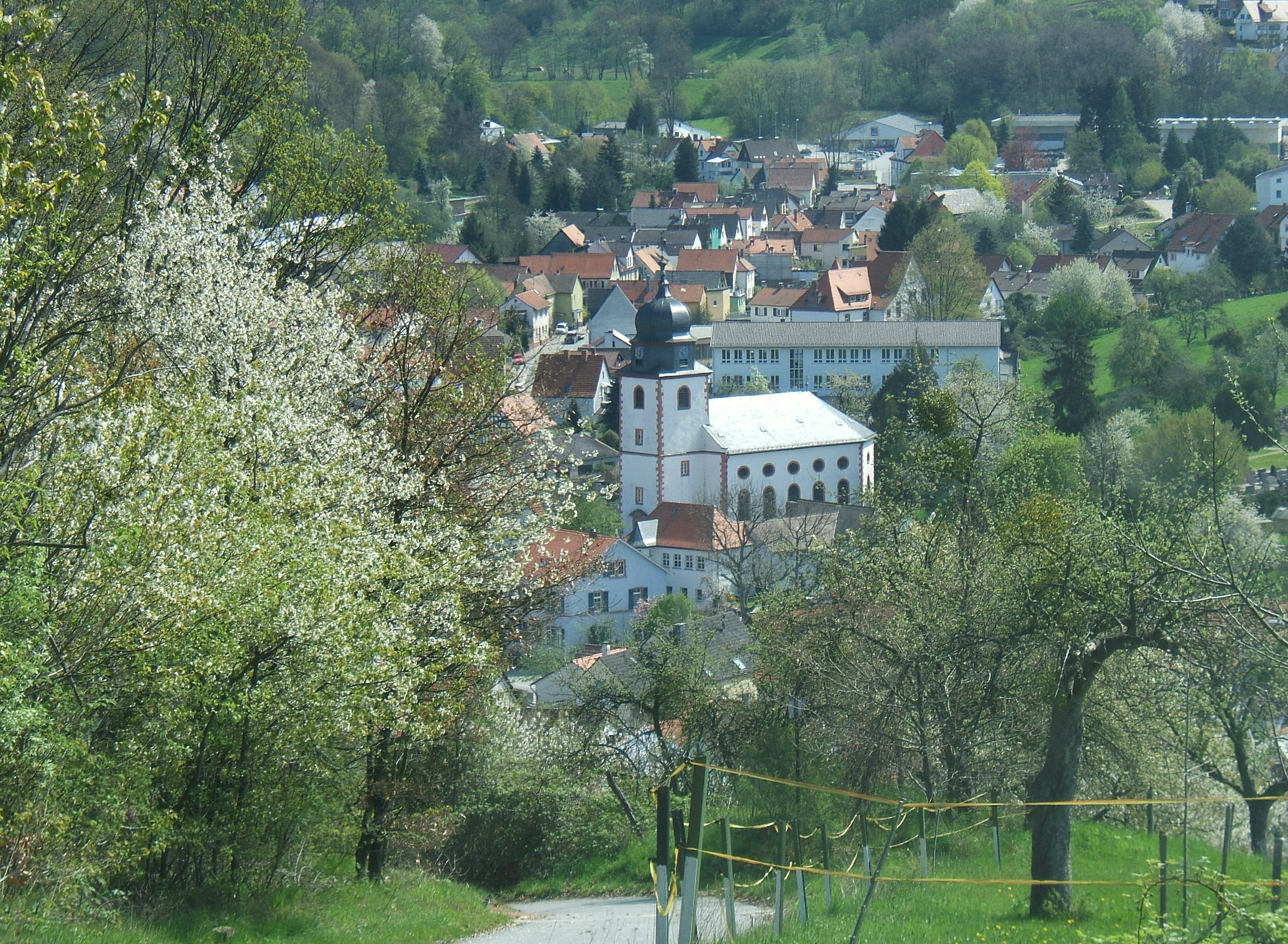
Constituent community of Reichenbach with Evangelical church – behind are the Felsenmeerschule and at upper right a dimension stone factory

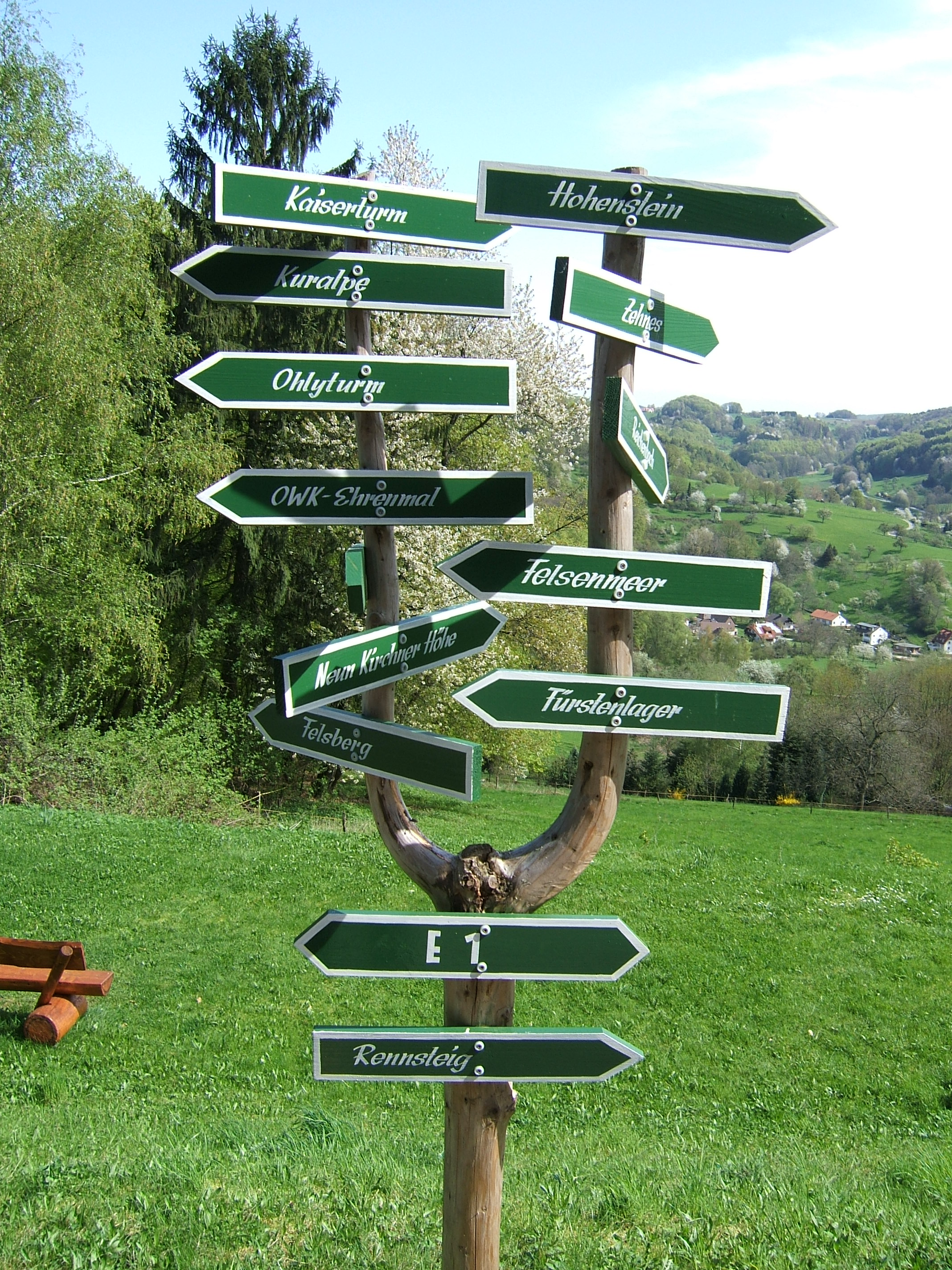
A signpost at the Naturfreundehaus Borstein points to all tourist destinations: Kaiser Tower (Kaiserturm), Kuralpe, Ohlyturm, Odenwaldklub memorial, Borstein, Neunkirchen Heights, Felsberg, Hohenstein, Zehnes, Reichenbach, Felsenmeer, Fürstenlager (park), E1

The community of Lautertal came into being through municipal reform on 1 January 1972. The formerly self-governing communities of Beedenkirchen, Elmshausen, Gadernheim, Lautern, Raidelbach, Reichenbach, Staffel and Wurzelbach merged voluntarily, but later the same year, the communities of Knoden and Schannenbach were forcibly merged with Lautertal, and so was Schmal-Beerbach in 1978.

Some of the individual constituent communities had their beginnings in Roman times and the Middle Ages (of a castle that supposedly once stood near Gadernheim, there is no trace today).

== Politics ==
=== Community council ===
The municipal election held on 26 March 2006 yielded the following results:

Parties and voter communities		% 2006	Seats; 2006	% 2001	Seats; 2001
CDU	Christian Democratic Union of Germany	33.7	10	30.8	10
SPD	Social Democratic Party of Germany	50.6	16	51.8	16
FDP	Free Democratic Party	2.2	1	–	–
FWGL	Freie Wählergemeinschaft Lautertal	7.0	2	10.3	3
GLL	Grüne Liste Lautertal	6.4	2	7.1	2
Total		100.0	31	100.0	31
Voter turnout in %		54.3		59.2	

=== Mayor ===
Andreas Heun (SPD) is Lautertal's mayor since 2018.

=== Town partnerships ===
- Parish of Aldenham, Hertfordshire, England, United Kingdom since 25 October 1980
- Jarnac, Charente, France since 4 September 1982

== Culture and sightseeing ==
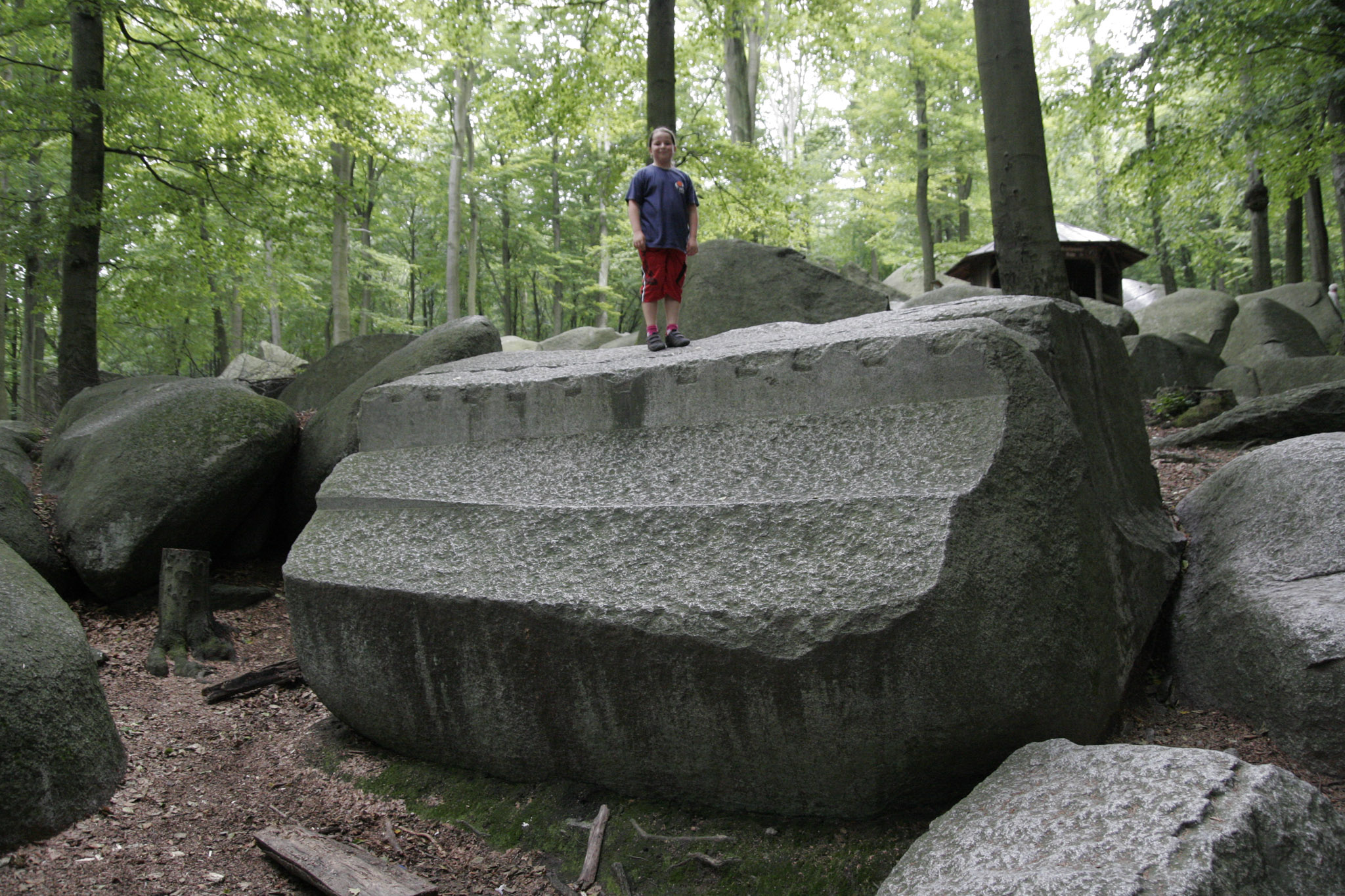
The "Altar Stone" at Felsenmeer

The Geo-Naturpark Bergstraße-Odenwald is a local recreation area for many daytrippers from the heavily populated Frankfurt Rhine Main Region and Rhine Neckar Area. Besides the many local hiking trails, two European long-distance paths cross in Lautertal, E1 and E8.

=== Felsenmeer ===
Popular with families is the nationally known Felsenmeer above the constituent community of Reichenbach. The reason is that there is a slope here with rounded blocks of granite that is easily climbed even by children. The Romans used the Felsenmeer as a source of building material, witnessing which is, among other things, the so-called Riesensäule – “Giant's Column”.

=== Hohenstein and Borstein ===
In the constituent community of Reichenbach lie two climbing cliffs recognized by the German Alpine Club (Deutscher Alpenverein), the 17 m-high Hohenstein und der 8 m-high Borstein near the Naturfreundehaus. Both cliffs can be climbed with a slight degree of difficulty and are used in many climbing courses.

=== Historic houses ===
Several constituent communities have kept their old timber-frame town halls, mostly from the 16th and 17th centuries. These are Elmshausen, Reichenbach and Gadernheim, whose old town hall now houses the local history museum. Gadernheim has also been home to a smithy since 1608, the Lauter valley's oldest building. Moreover, it is one of Hesse's oldest unchanged smithies. It is, however, in a bad state and may not be preserved much longer.

=== Kaiserturm ===
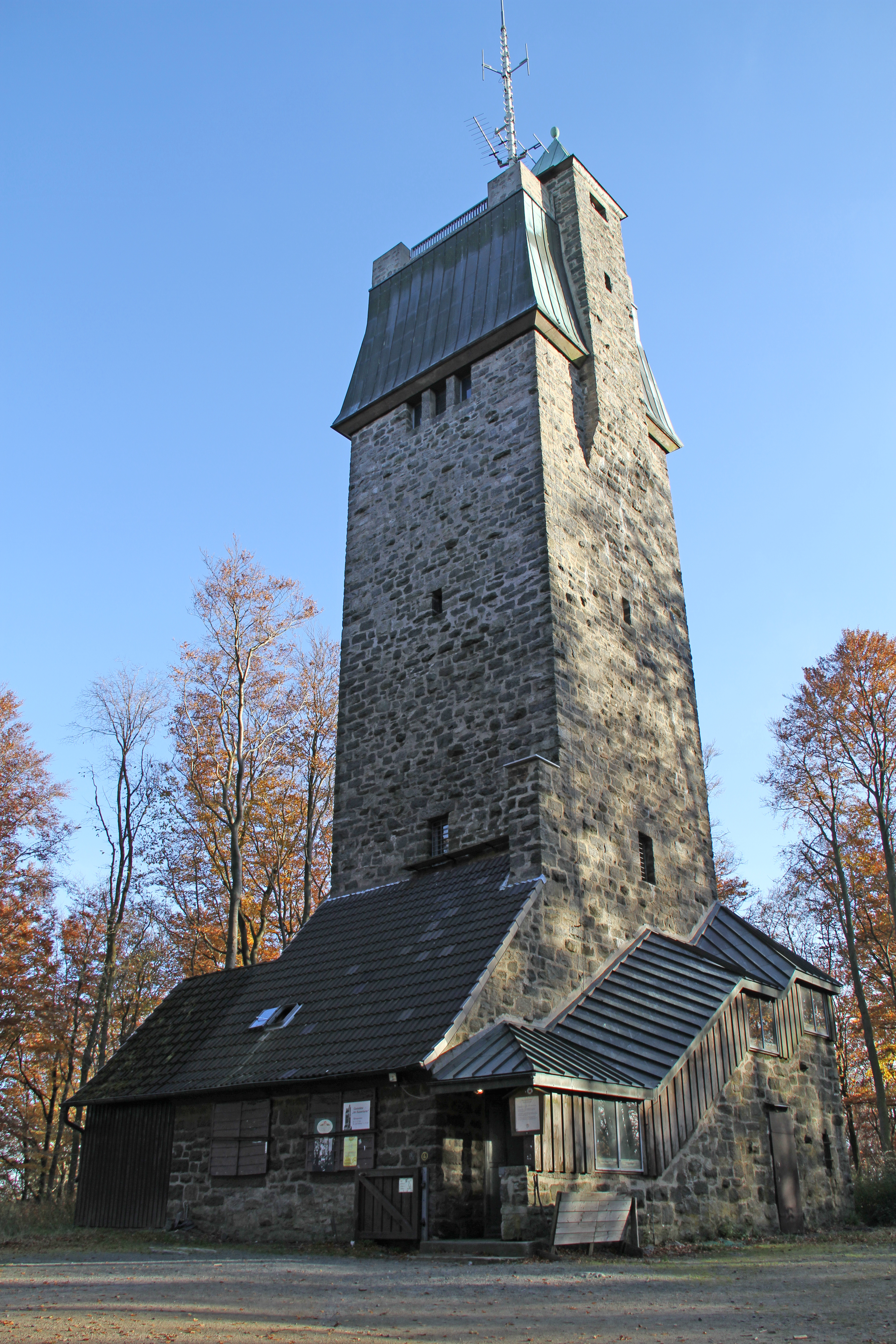
The Emperor's Tower (Kaiserturm)

This tower's forerunner was a 24 m-tall wooden tower built in 1888 by Adam Fleischman which blew down on the stormy night of 11 February 1904.

The Emperor Tower was built in memory of Emperor William I on the Neunkircher Höhe ("Neunkirchen Heights") and is the Lauter valley's highest point. It is within Gadernheim's limits. In its current incarnation it was designed by architects Hacker and Jaide as a lookout tower with a height of 34 m. Master builder Adam Arras from Gadernheim built the tower in 1906 and 1907. The project initiators chose the 25th anniversary of the Darmstadt chapter of the Odenwaldklub as the occasion on which to formally open the tower to the public in a dedication ceremony on 7 July 1907.

In 1982, the Kaiserturm was extensively restored.

Only a few years later, though, cracks began to appear once again in the tower due to “huge antennae” used by the post and the police. Rainwater leaked in and started processes of decay. In November 1986, thanks to financial help from the districts of Darmstadt-Dieburg and Bergstraße as well as the city of Darmstadt, all damage was repaired.

In the Kaiserturm is found the Odenwald's “highest pub”.

=== Evangelical Parish Church in Gadernheim ===
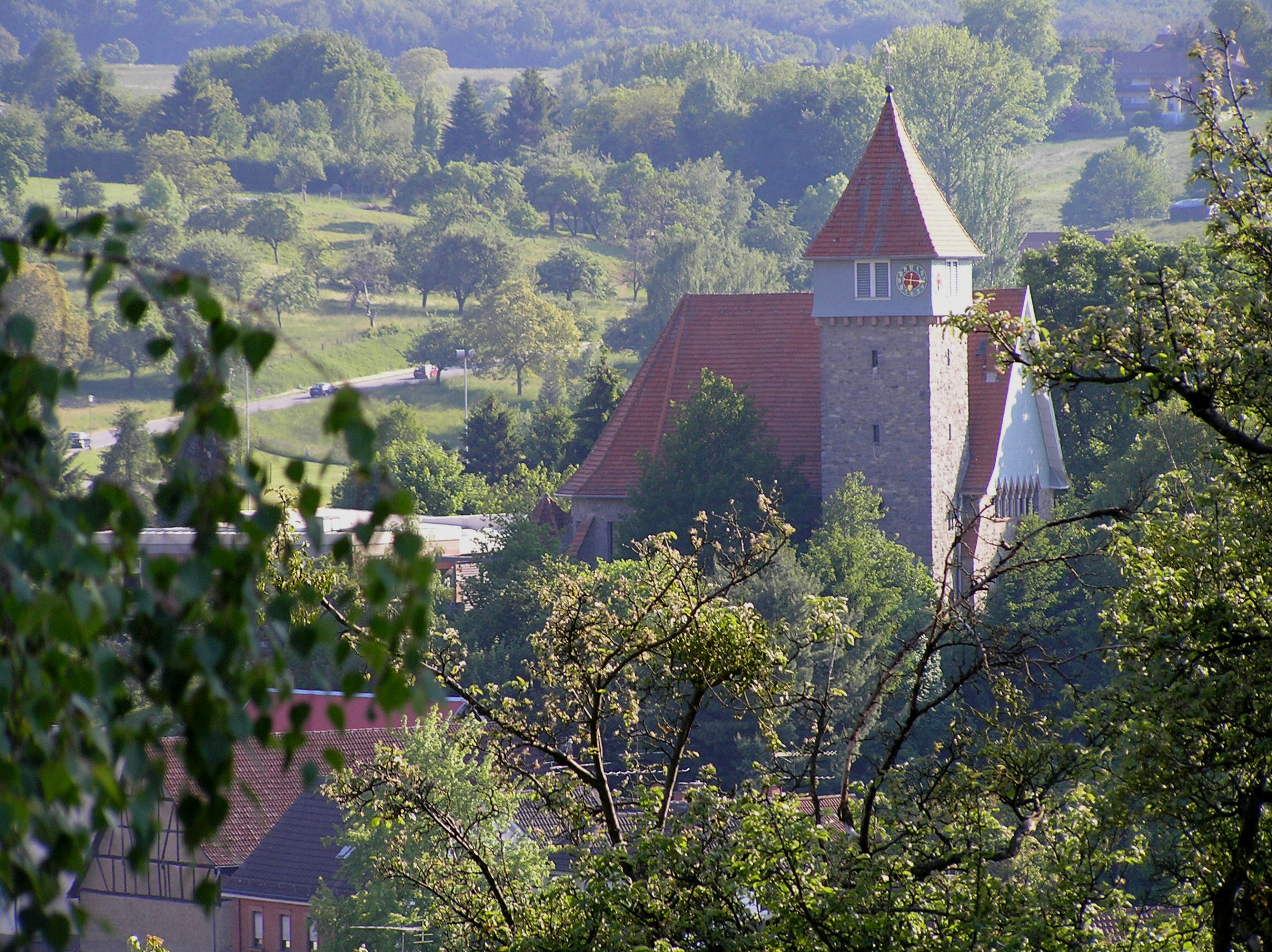
Church in Gadernheim

In 1912 and 1913, the well known Art Nouveau architect Heinrich Metzendorf built this great church in the so-called Heimatstil (“Homeland style”). Standing on the village's highest hill, it dominates the upper Lauter valley. It is a one-room church with overhanging polygonal apse and a façade tower, all topped with steep roofs. On the outside, the stone is mostly granite with sandstone elements. The upper part of the façade and tower is covered in greyish-blue-lacquered shakes.

The furnishings inside – pews and altar – are original equipment.
