= Josefův Důl =

Josefův Důl may refer to places in the Czech Republic:

- Josefův Důl (Jablonec nad Nisou District), a municipality and village in the Liberec Region
- Josefův Důl (Mladá Boleslav District), a municipality and village in the Central Bohemian Region
