= Ziegelbach =

Ziegelbach may refer to:

- Ziegelbach (Brenz), a river of Baden-Württemberg, Germany, tributary of the Brenz
- Auer (Odenwald), other name Ziegelbach, a river in the Odenwald, Hesse, Germany
- Ziegelbach (Bad Wurzach), a district of Bad Wurzach, a town of Baden-Württemberg, Germany
