= Kriehuber =

Kriehuber is a German surname. Notable people with the surname include:

- Friedrich Kriehuber (1834–1871), Austrian draftsman, lithographer, and woodcut artist, son of Josef
- Josef Kriehuber (1800–1876), Austrian lithographer and painter
