= Marguerre =

Marguerre is a surname. Notable people with the surname include:

- Eleonore Marguerre (born 1978), German opera singer
- Wolfgang Marguerre (born 1941), German billionaire
