= Felsberg =

Felsberg (German: rock hill) may refer to:

- Felsberg, Hessen, a town in Schwalm-Eder-Kreis, Hessen, Germany
- Felsberg, Saar, a part of Überherrn, Landkreis Saarlouis, Saarland, Germany
- Felsberg (Odenwald), a mountain in the Odenwald hills, Landkreis Bergstraße, Hessen, Germany
- Felsberg, Switzerland, a town in the Grisons, Switzerland
  - Felsberg railway station, a Rhaetian Railway station
