= State International School Seeheim =

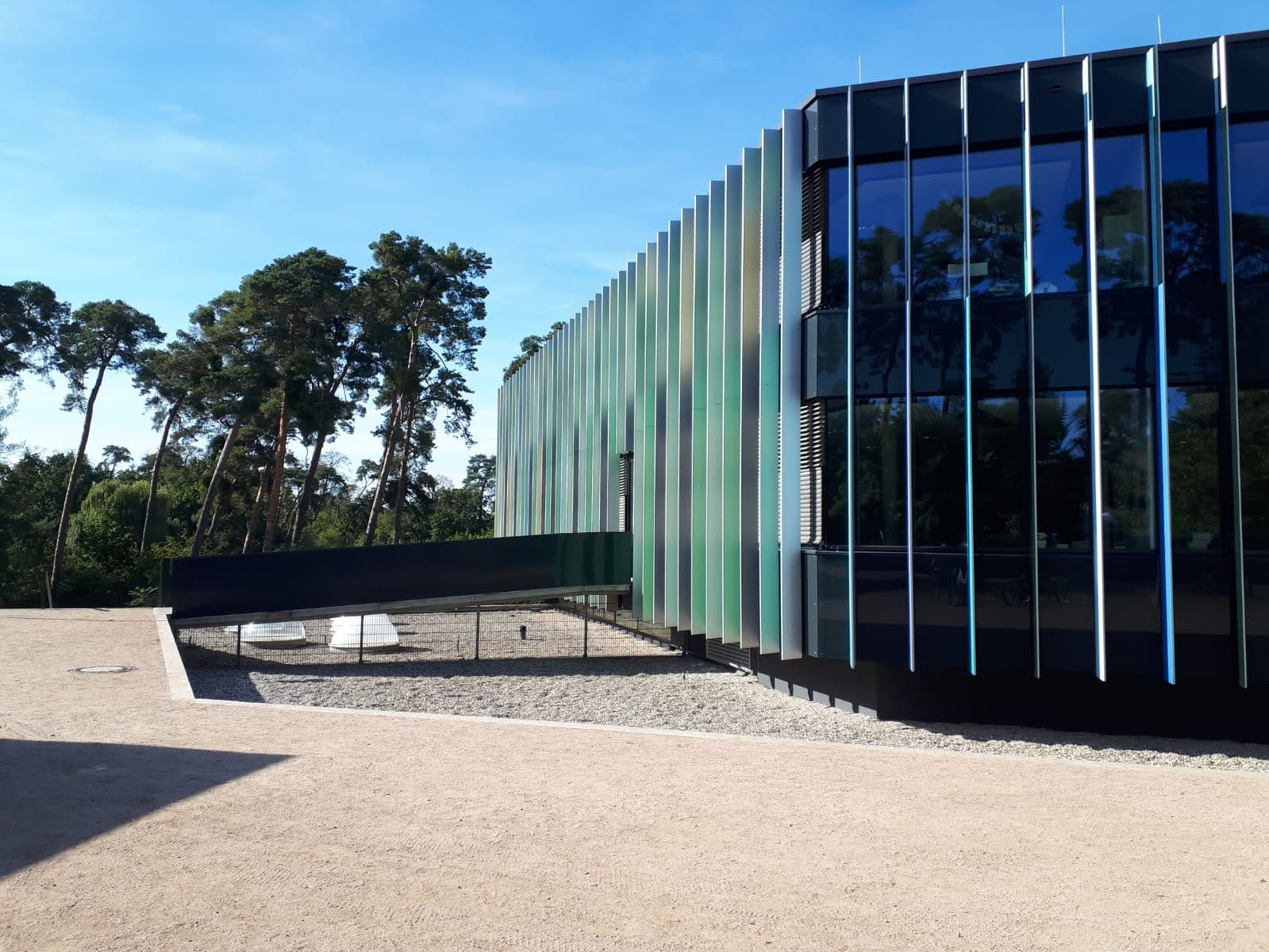
- SISS building during the summer

The State International School Seeheim, also called SISS is the international branch of the Schuldorf Bergstraße. It is made up of a primary and a secondary branch as well as a pre-school. The school represents a pilot project in Germany - a public school where the language of instruction is primarily English. The school is a community of people from different parts of the world and has strived to be internationally profound. The school has been architecturally designed to look like an irregular pentagon when viewed from above. This is the only state funded international school in Germany, and one of 3 international schools in Germany that offer the IB Diploma Program. The Primary department is designed to prepare students for the International General Certificate of Secondary Education (IGCSE).

== Secondary ==
The SISS Secondary is for students of Y5 and over. The curriculum includes:

- The Cambridge Checkpoints in Y8
- The IGCSE in Y10
- The IB in Y12

Students in the IB program are registered for the following subjects:

Group 1: Studies in language and literature

- ENGLISH A LAL HL/SL
- GERMAN A LAL HL/SL

Group 2: Language acquisition

- GERMAN B HL/SL
- SPANISH B HL/SL
- FRENCH B HL/SL

Group 3: Individuals and societies

- HISTORY HL/SL
- GEOGRAPHY HL/SL
- GLOBAL POLITICS HL/SL

Group 4: (Experimental) Sciences

- PHYSICS HL/SL
- CHEMISTRY HL/SL
- BIOLOGY HL/SL

Group 5: Mathematics

- MATH ANALYSIS AND APPOACHES HL/SL
- MATH APPLICATIONS AND INTERPRETATIONS SL

Group 6: The arts

- VISUAL ARTS SL

Compulsory courses

- THEORY KNOWL.
- SPORTS

They must take 3 Higher Level (HL) subjects and 3 Standard Level (SL) subjects.

== Amenities ==
- Library
- 3 Labs
- Music room with instruments
- School newspaper - 'The Eyes of SISS'
- Kiosk - 'The Pub'
- Interactive whiteboards in every classroom
- Portable laptop trolleys
- non-functioning water fountain
- functioning water dispenser
- art room with equipment
- gender segregated bathrooms

== History ==
In 2006 the primary branch (students of grades 1-4) of the school opened. It was followed up by the opening of the secondary branch (students of grades 5-12) in 2010. In 2016 the first batch of students graduated school. The school has been certified of being an international IB school since 7 July 2014.

== Awards ==
The school won the Deutschland - Land der Ideen prize in 2007.

== Charitable events ==
The State International School Seeheim has been organizing an event named 'Walkathon' since 2008. The school has raised over 100,000 euros for various charities. Some include:

- Viva con Agua
- Medecins Sans Frontieres
- Deutsche Krebshilfe
- Help alliance
- CBM
- Child aid network

== Student competitions ==
The school participates in the Jugend Forscht competition each year.

- In 2015 4 teams from SISS achieved 1st place in regional championships.
- In 2017 1 team achieved 2nd place in state championships in Hessen.
- In 2019 2 teams qualified for the state championship in Hessen and 1 team qualified for the 'Schüler Experimentieren' state championship.

In 2015 students from SISS were in the National championship for Jugend trainiert für Olympia.

== Controversies ==
In 2014 a petition was launched by some parents of students studying at SISS. The petition stated due to the parents being unhappy about the sacking of one of the staff members. The petition was launched on openPetition and received support from many of the students at SISS. It contained an accusation at the school's then Headmaster, saying that he allegedly threw a keyboard at a student. The petition resulted in a failure due to the petitioners revoking their statement. Later on, they published an apology saying that "We would like to apologise that we [made the accusation] in the name of all 317 petitioners, which was not a fully true picture. Of the 317 petitioners 5 actually withdrew their support and explicitly disagreed with this approach (others might have silently disagreed)."

== Teachers ==
Some of the teachers include:

- Noreen Nasar (IGCSE Coordinator)
- Wolfgang Scheuerpflug (IB Coordinator)
- Rupert Toogood (Lower Secondary Coordinator)
