= Friedrich Kriehuber =

Austrian lithographer (1834–1871)

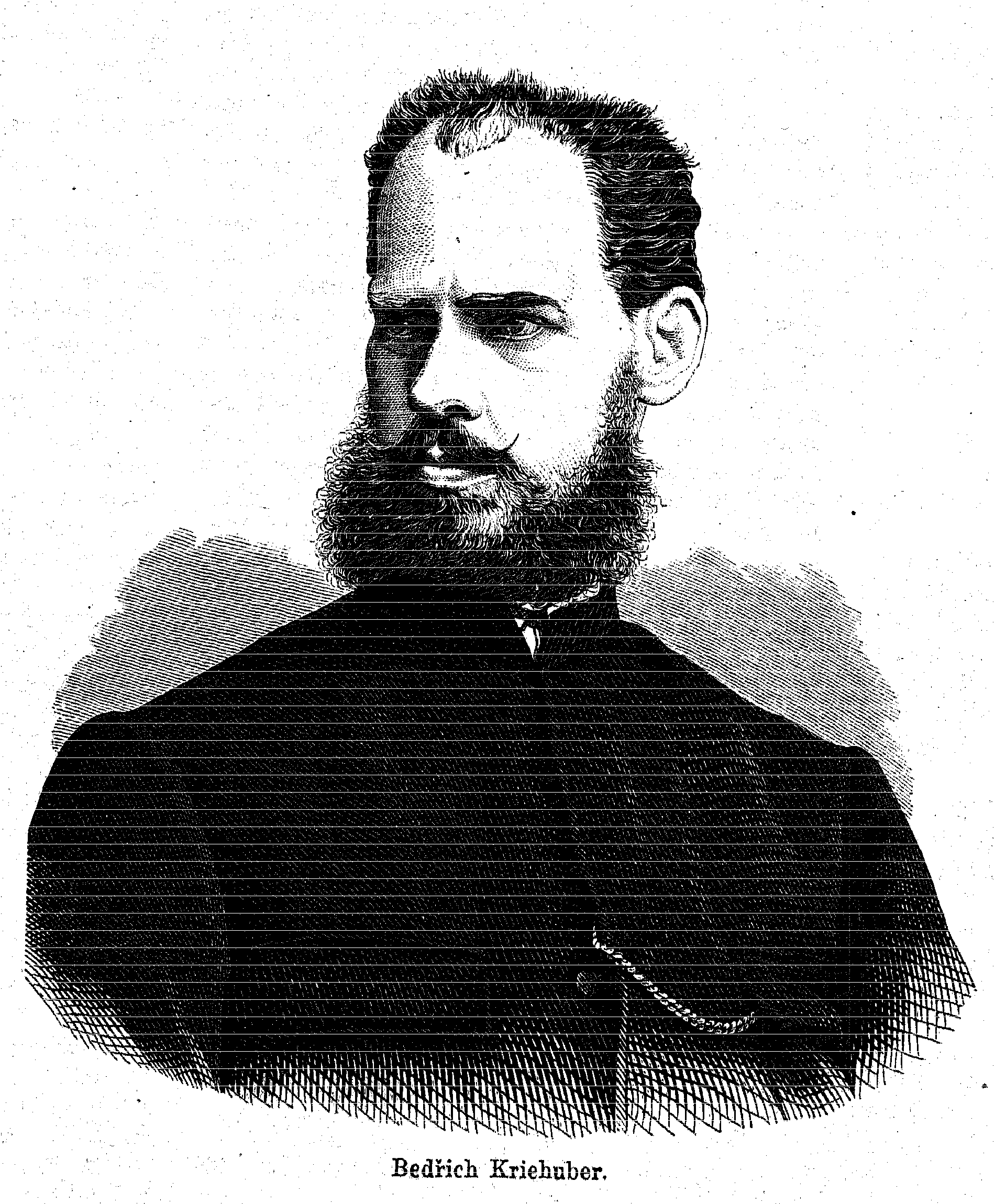
Presumed self-portrait (from Světozor, 3 November 1871)

Friedrich Kriehuber (sometimes Bedřich or Fritz Kriehuber; 7 June 1834 – 13 October 1871) was an Austrian draftsman, lithographer and woodcut artist.

== Life and work ==
Friedrich Kriehuber was born on 7 June 1834 in Vienna. He was the son of Josef Kriehuber, a well-known portrait painter and lithographer. Beginning in 1848, he attended the Academy of Fine Arts, Vienna. Initially, he was a landscape painter but later turned to portraits and, as an employee of his father, lithography.

Many of his works were published by Eduard Hallberger as illustrations for his magazine Über Land und Meer (Over Land and Sea). A year after Kriehuber's death, some of his lithographs appeared in Das jahr 1848. Geschichte der Wiener revolution (a two volume history of the Vienna Uprising) by Heinrich Reschauer and Moritz Smetazko, known as "Moritz Smets" (1828-1890).

He suffered from chronic health problems for most of his life and died on 12 October 1871 in Vienna of a pulmonary disorder at the Austrian Hydrotherapy Institute, shortly after being appointed a professor at the Theresian Military Academy.

== Selected lithographs ==
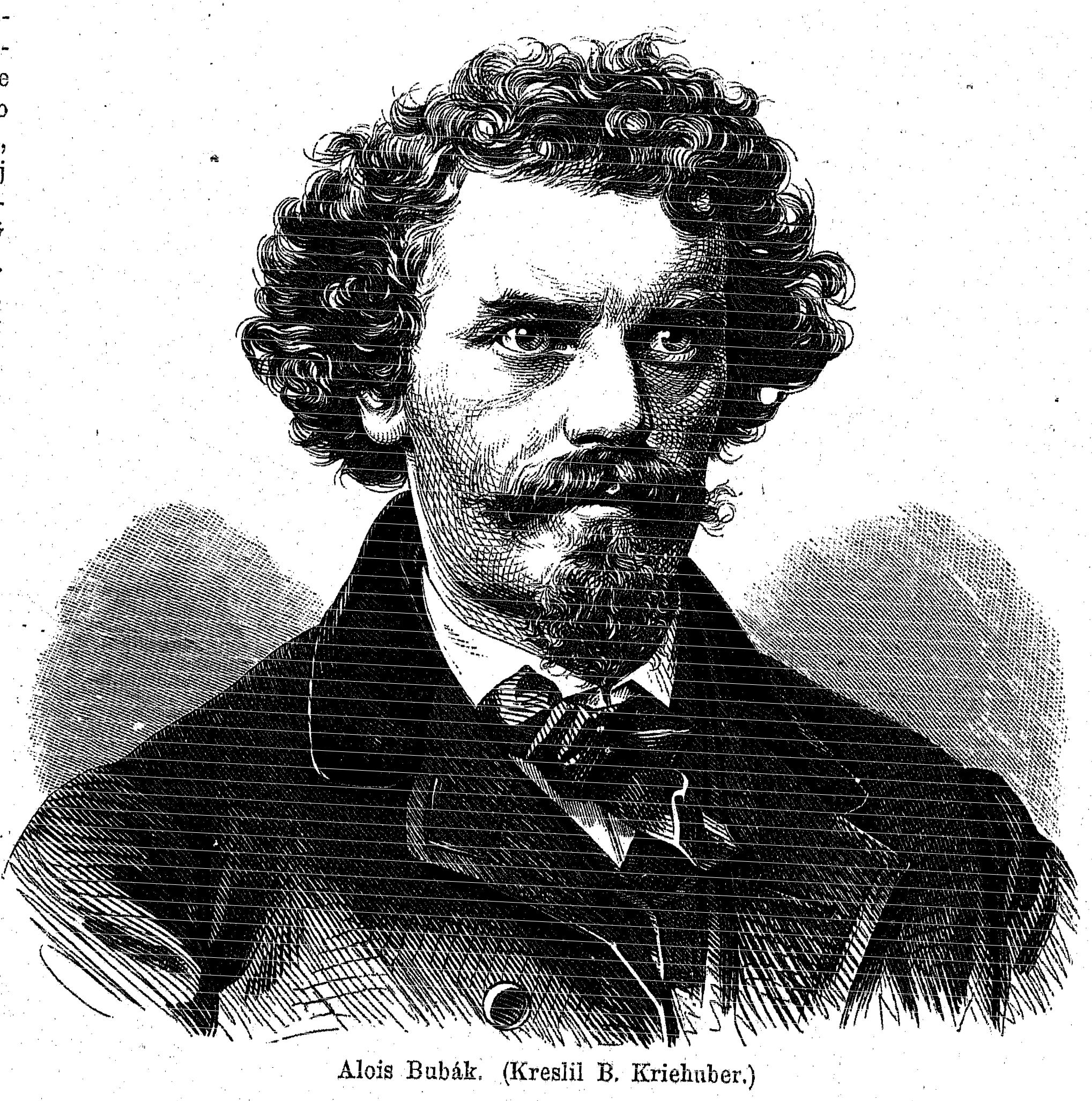
Alois Bubák

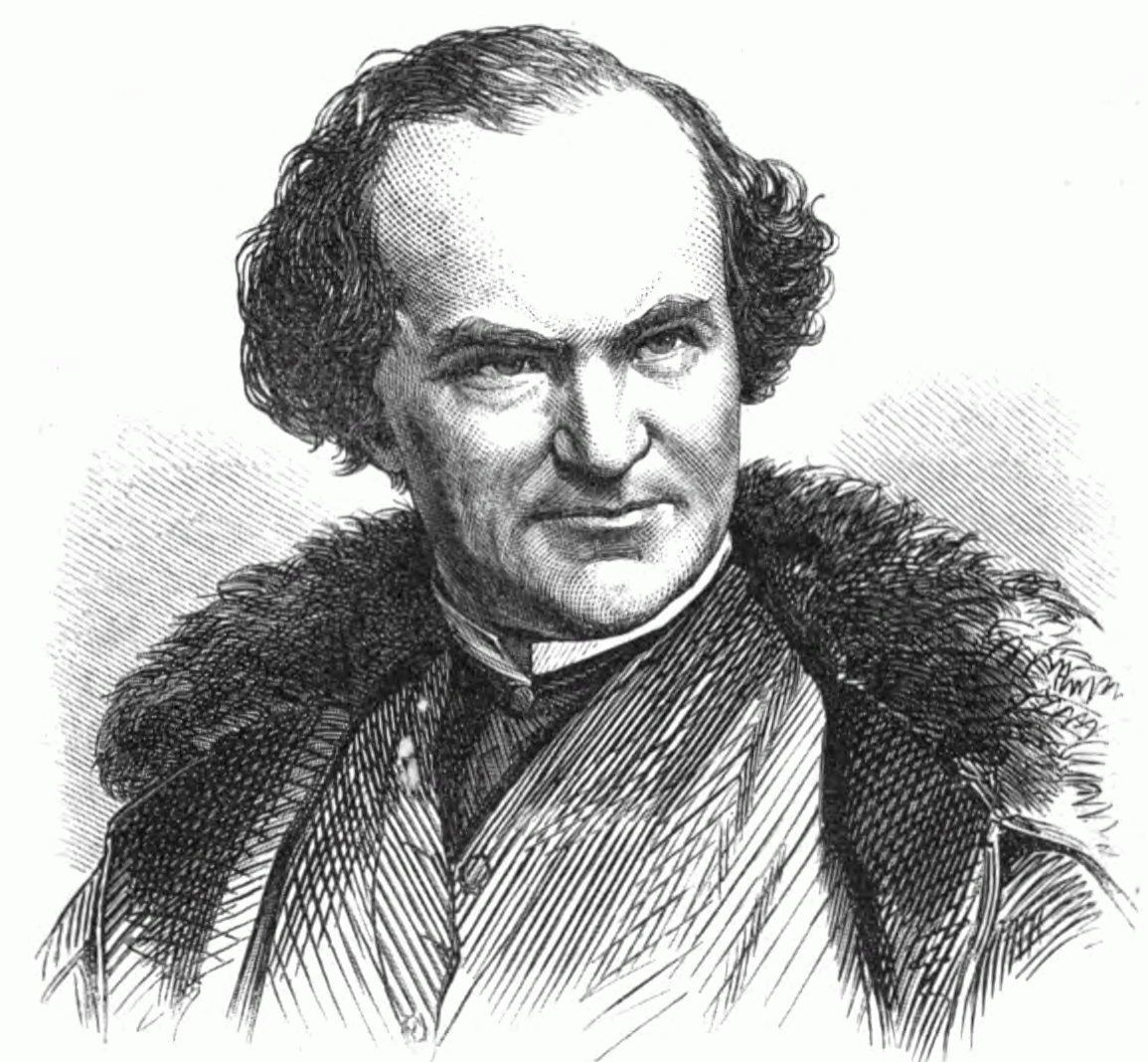
Bogumil Dawison

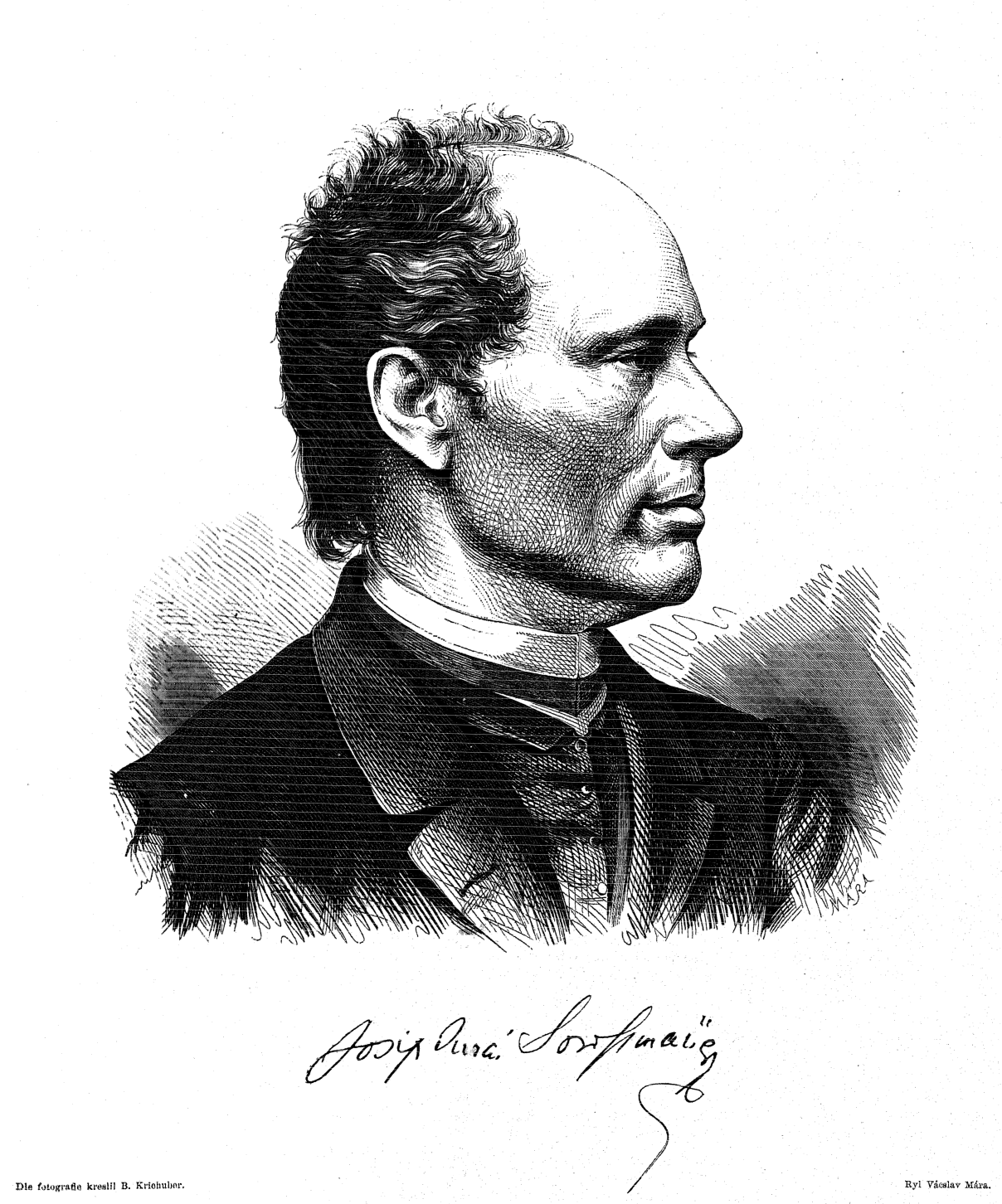
Josip Juraj Strossmayer

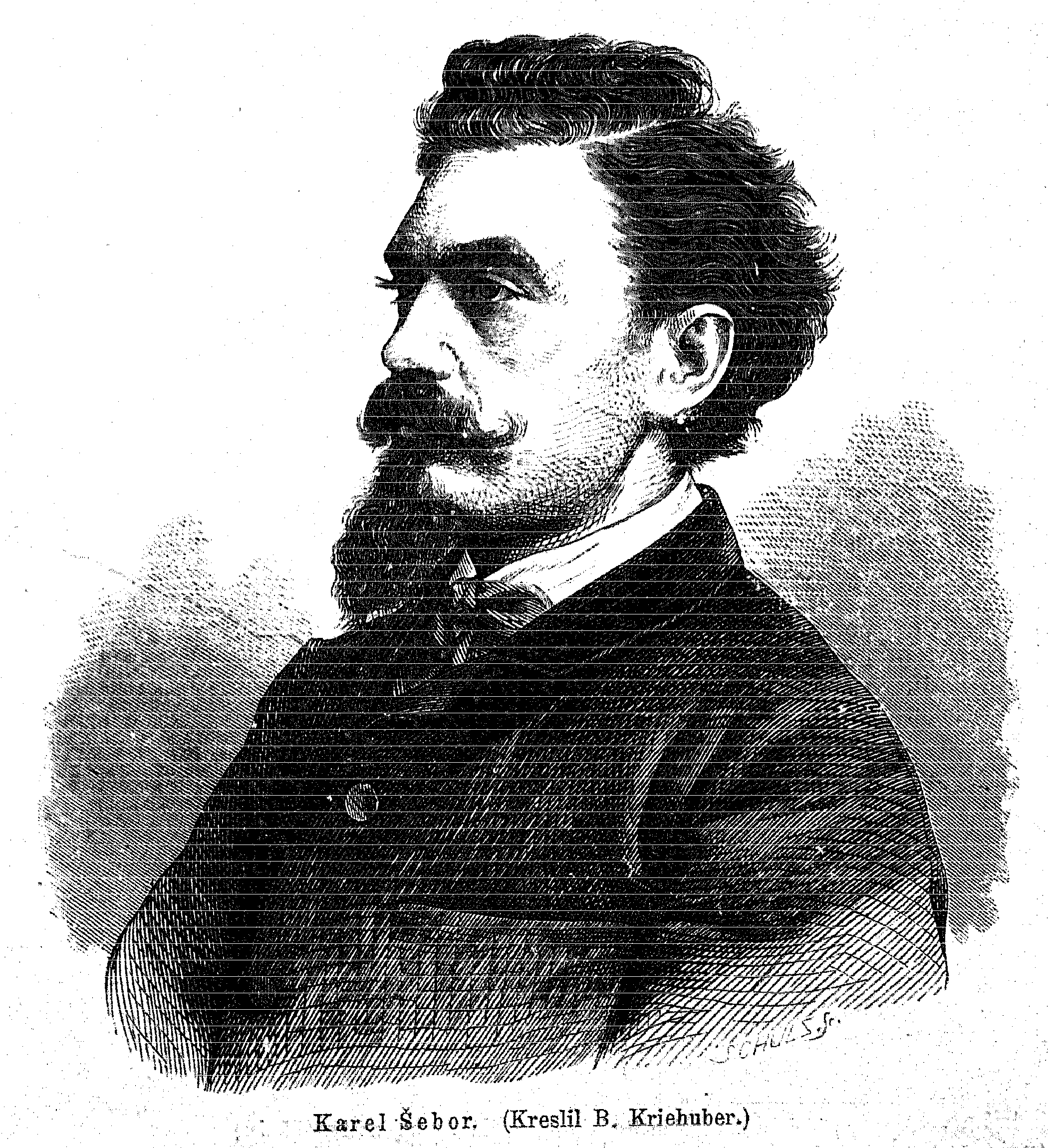
Karel Šebor

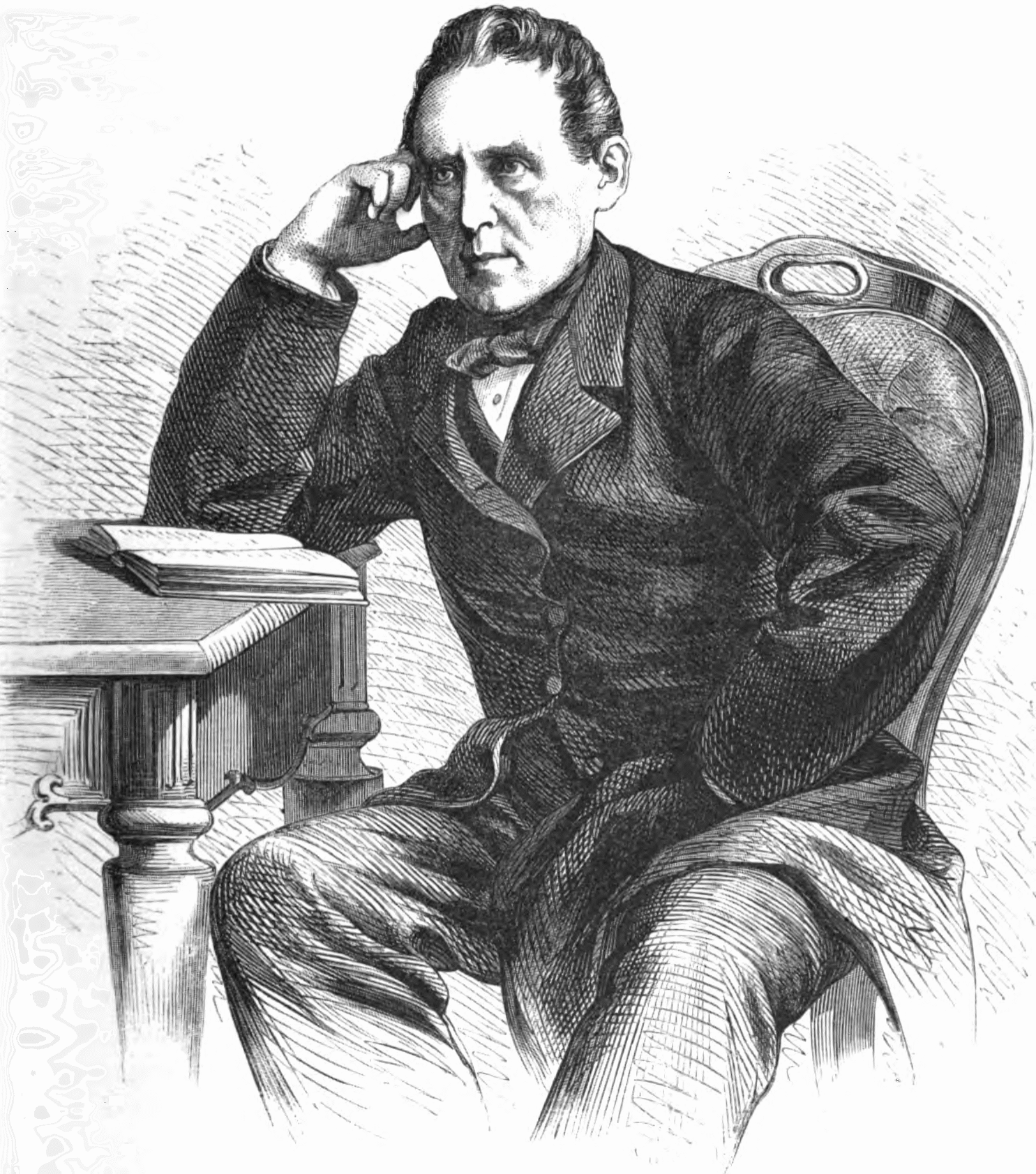
Janez Bleiweis
