= Balkhausen =

Coordinates: 49°44′03″N 8°39′32″E

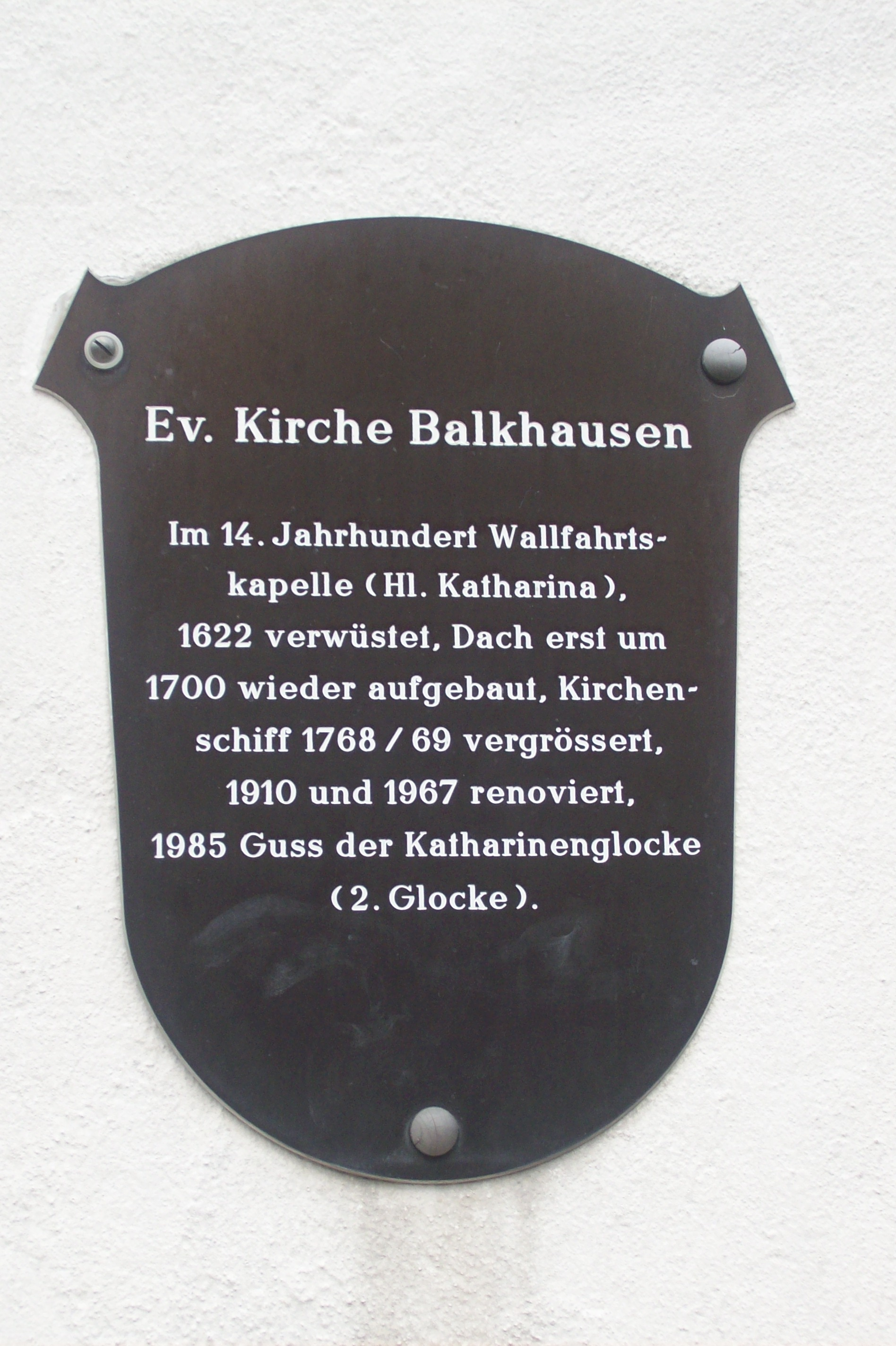
Plaque at the Protestant church in Balkhausen

Balkhausen is a village of 693 inhabitants forming part of the municipality Seeheim-Jugenheim, Darmstadt-Dieburg district in Hesse, Germany.

== Geography ==
Balkhausen lies in the Vorderer Odenwald in South Hesse in the valley between the Melibokus - massif in the west and the Felsberg (Odenwald) - massif in the east. The district includes the source area of the Quaddelbach (Landbach) (partly also called Quattelbach), which leads in northern direction down the valley to Seeheim-Jugenheim, where it unites with the Stettbach to the Landbach. The southern boundary follows the ridge that connects the two mountain massifs with a saddle height of about 285 meters. The southern boundary is a few hundred meters away from this transition to the Mühltal, through which one can reach Auerbach (Bensheim) along the Mühlbach to the south via Hochstädten to Auerbach, which as a district of Bensheim lies on the Bergstraße and on the eastern edge of the Upper Rhine Plain. Following the Quaddelbach up the valley to the east, one either comes to the Felsenmeer or via the Kuralpe at the Staffeler Kreuz down to Staffel and further to Modautal.

East of the village in the direction of Schmal-Beerbach lies the settlement Quattelbach (Balkhausen), which was first documented in 1377 as a hamlet and has always been part of the Balkhausen district.

== History ==
The first known mention of the village dates back to 1357 and is a document that was written at Bickenbach Castle (today Schloss Alsbach) about the castle's peace there. In this document also estates in Balkhusen are mentioned. In later documents Balkhausen becomes Balkhusen under the place namen Balkhusen (1357), Blaghuß" (1380-1388), "Whale pants" and "Balkhusen" (1415), "Balkhusen" (1451), "Balckhusen" (1496) and "Balckhausen" (1553) are mentioned.

The church of Balkhausen is mentioned in the middle of the 14th century. It was always branch church of Jugenheim. In 1571, Balkhausen was granted the Amt Auerbach and 1621 administered by Amt Seeheim-Tannenberg.

After the Thirty Years' War Balkhausen was completely extinct only in 1648 a resident is found again in the chronicles, moved in from the surroundings. Only in 1660 there were 27 inhabitants again.

In the 18th century, the structure of the village was consolidated; buildings were built along the natural line of the Quaddelbach stream. Thus slowly a so-called Waldhufendorf is being created.

In 1714 the County of Erbach, which ruled the Odenwald area for 500 years, was forced to sell Balkhausen as an accessory to the Amt Seeheim-Tannenberg to the Landgraviate of Hesse-Darmstadt due to financial difficulties. It then remained in Hesse or its predecessor states until today.
