= Kosmonosy =

- Town
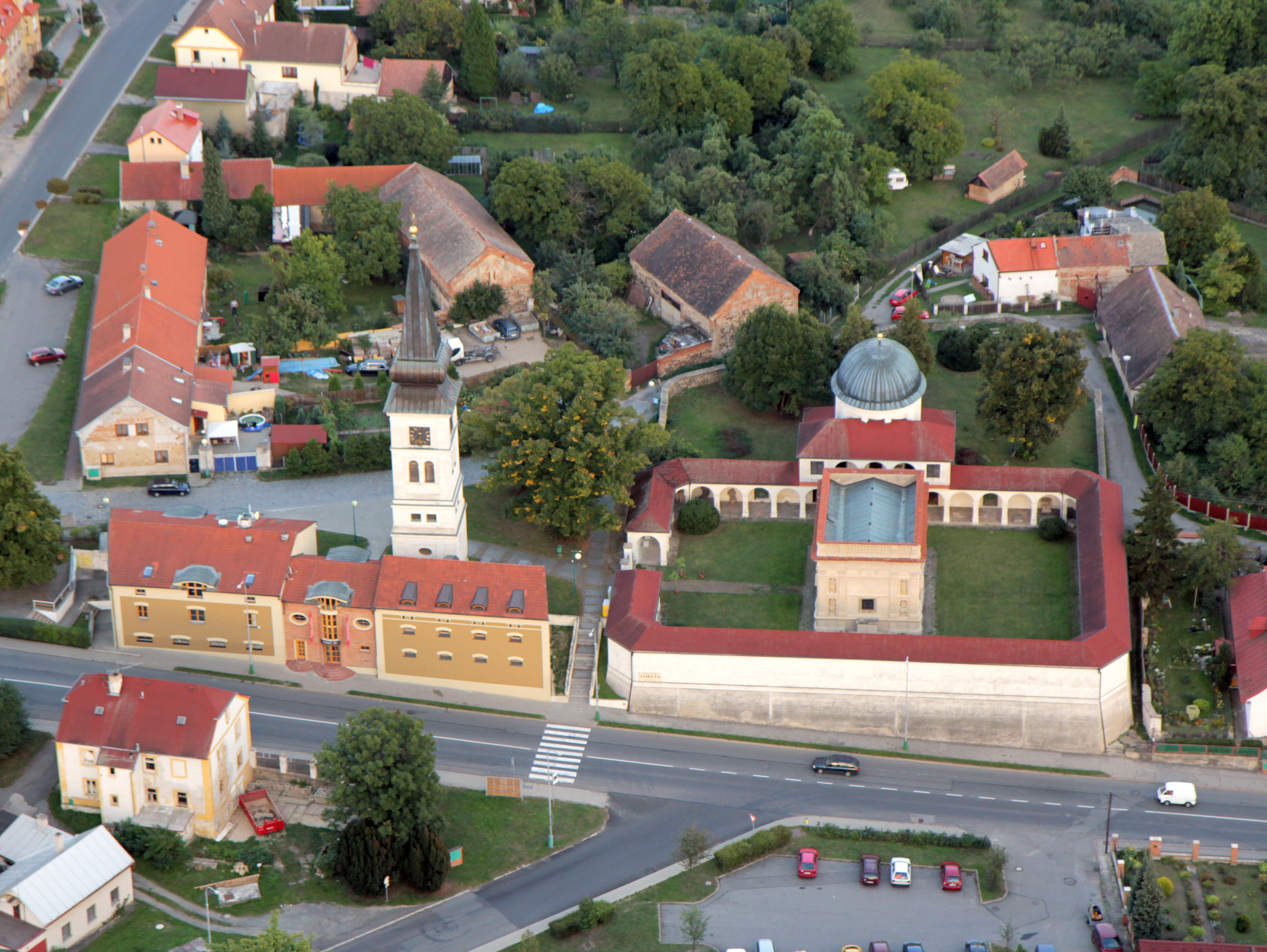
- Loreta chapel and Campanilla bell tower

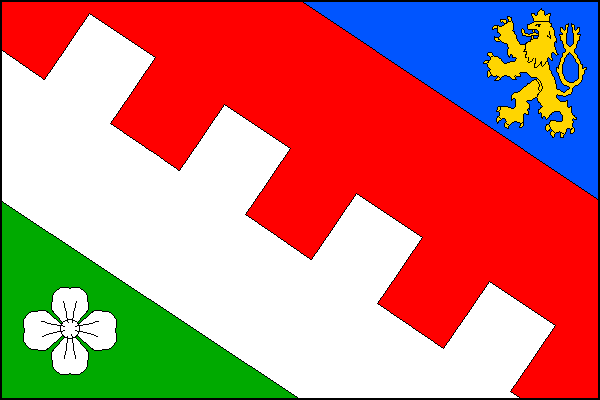
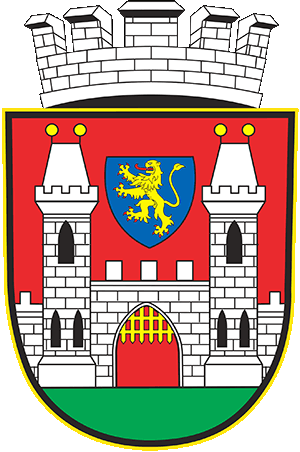
- Flag Coat of arms

- Location in the Czech Republic
- Coordinates: 50°26′24″N 14°55′40″E
- Country: Czech Republic
- Region: Central Bohemian
- District: Mladá Boleslav
- First mentioned: 1186

Government
  - Mayor: Eduard Masarčík

Area
  - Total: 11.39 km^{2} (4.40 sq mi)
- Elevation: 243 m (797 ft)

Population (2026-01-01)
  - Total: 5,437
  - Density: 477.3/km^{2} (1,236/sq mi)
- Time zone: UTC+1 (CET)
  - Summer (DST): UTC+2 (CEST)
- Postal code: 293 06
- Website: www.kosmonosy.cz

Kosmonosy (Czech pronunciation: [ˈkosmonosɪ]) is a town in Mladá Boleslav District in the Central Bohemian Region of the Czech Republic. It has about 5,400 inhabitants. The town is located in the Jičín Uplands and creates a conurbation with the city of Mladá Boleslav. Kosmonosy is known for its psychiatric hospital.

== Administrative division ==
Kosmonosy consists of two municipal parts (in brackets population according to the 2021 census):

- Kosmonosy (4,722)
- Horní Stakory (421)

== Etymology ==
The name Kosmonosy is derived from the Old Czech word kosmy ('hair') and the Czech word nositi ('to wear'), meaning "the village of people who wear hair (are very hairy)".

== Geography ==
Kosmonosy is located about 46 kilometres (29 mi) northeast of Prague. It is urbanistically fused with the city of Mladá Boleslav. It lies in the Jičín Uplands. The highest point is the hill Baba at 363 m (1,191 ft) above sea level.

== History ==
The first written mention of Kosmonosy is from 1186, when Duke Frederick donated the village to the order of Knights Hospitaller. They had built here the Church of Saint Martin. The church and partly the village were destroyed during the Hussite Wars. In 1607, during the rule of Jiří of Hohenlohe, Kosmonosy became the centre of a large estate.

From 1650 to 1739, the estate was owned by the Czernin family and prospered. They had built here several buildings, including the church and the Piarist monastery and college. From 1730, the Czernins sold off their property due to debt. The local gymnasium, run by the monastery, became a centre of education in the region. However, in 1784 it was moved to Mladá Boleslav. A textile factory was built here in 1763 and the town became known for the textile industry, but the manufacture was moved to Josefův Důl in 1847. The monastery was abolished in 1784, but in 1867, the psychiatric hospital was established in its premises.

Kosmonosy was promoted to a market town in 1868 and to a town in 1913.

== Demographics ==
Historical population

Year	Pop.	±%
1869	2,758	—
1880	2,810	+1.9%
1890	2,852	+1.5%
1900	3,594	+26.0%
1910	4,211	+17.2%

Year	Pop.	±%
1921	3,782	−10.2%
1930	4,660	+23.2%
1950	3,992	−14.3%
1961	3,863	−3.2%
1970	3,224	−16.5%

Year	Pop.	±%
1980	3,768	+16.9%
1991	3,557	−5.6%
2001	3,885	+9.2%
2011	5,159	+32.8%
2021	5,143	−0.3%

Source: Censuses

== Economy ==
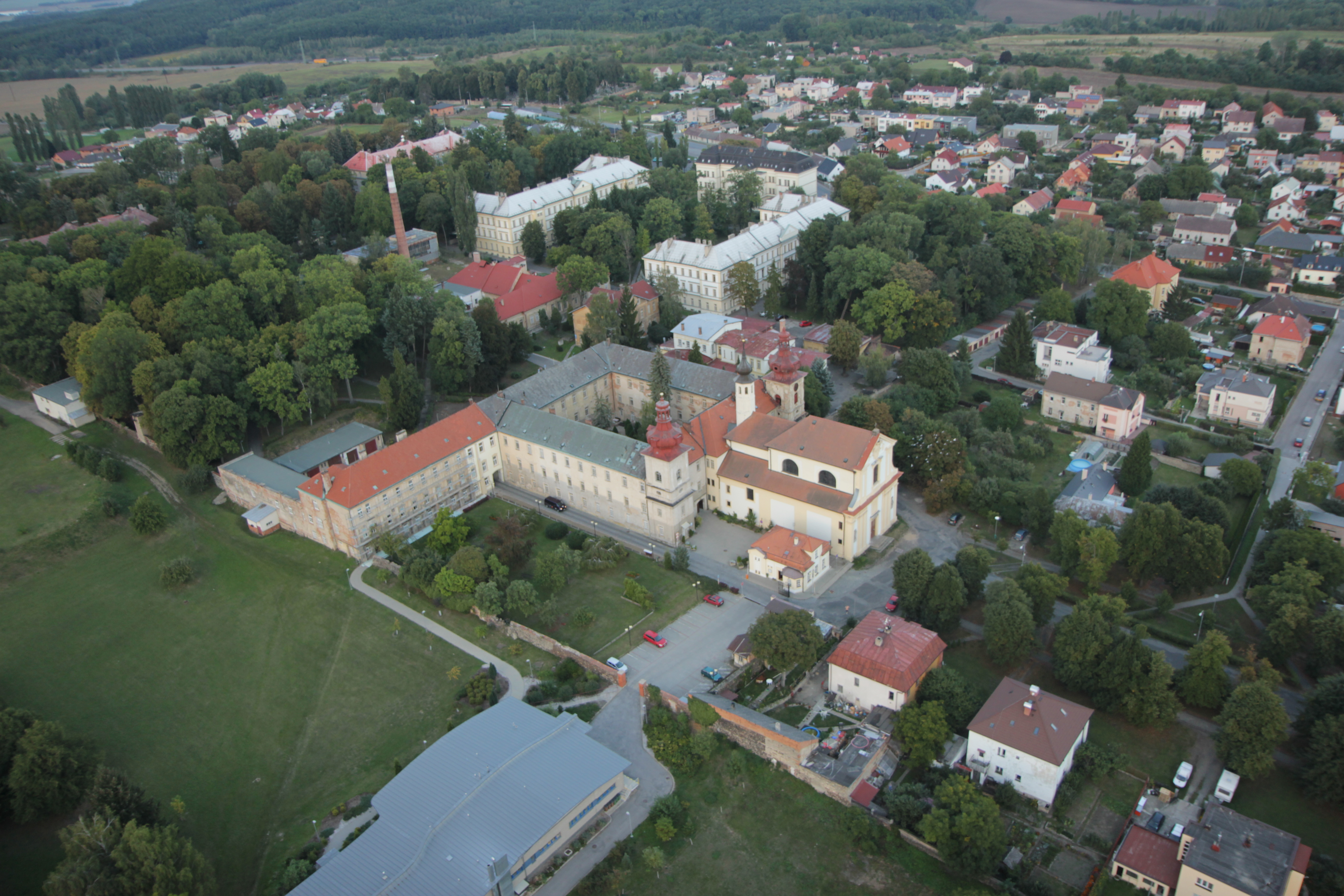
Aerial view of the psychiatric hospital

Kosmonosy is known for a psychiatric hospital. With more than 500 employees, it is the largest employer based in the town. It treats about 1,000 patients.

== Transport ==
The D10 motorway from Prague to Turnov runs next to the town.

== Sights ==
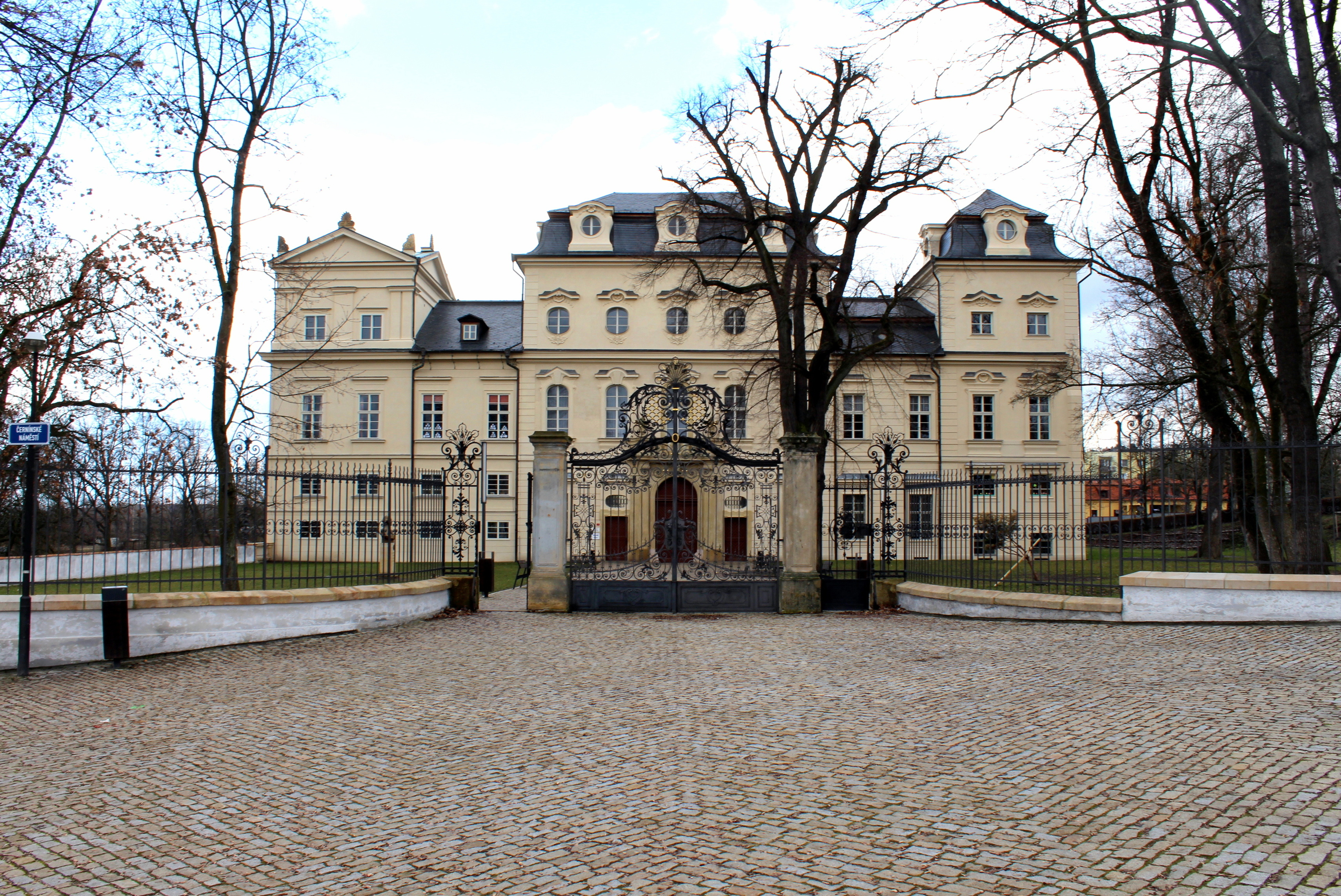
Kosmonosy Castle

The Church of the Exaltation of the Holy Cross was built in 1671–1673 and it was one of the first Baroque churches in the region. Next to the church is the former monastery, now the psychiatric hospital. It was built in 1688–1692, also in the early Baroque style.

The Loreta chapel and the adjacent Campanilla bell tower belongs to the most architecturally valuable buildings in the town. The bell tower was built in 1673 and the chapel in 1702–1708 on the site of the former wooden Church of Saint Martin. The walls of the chapel are decorated with reliefs from the life of the Virgin Mary, and statues of prophets are placed in niches. The complex is open to the public and offers sightseeing tours.

The Kosmonosy Castle was originally a Renaissance fortress, built in 1560–1570. It was rebuilt into a Baroque castle by the Czernin family in 1703–1709. The southern wing was then rebuilt in the Empire style in 1826. The castle is surrounded by a park. Today it houses a museum and primary school.

== Notable people ==
- Alois Bubák (1824–1870), landscape painter
- Gustav Adolf Procházka (1872–1942), patriarch of the Czechoslovak Hussite Church
- Václav Kopecký (1897–1961), communist politician

== Twin towns – sister cities ==
Kosmonosy is twinned with:

- Seeheim-Jugenheim, Germany
