= Helene Christaller =

German Protestant writer

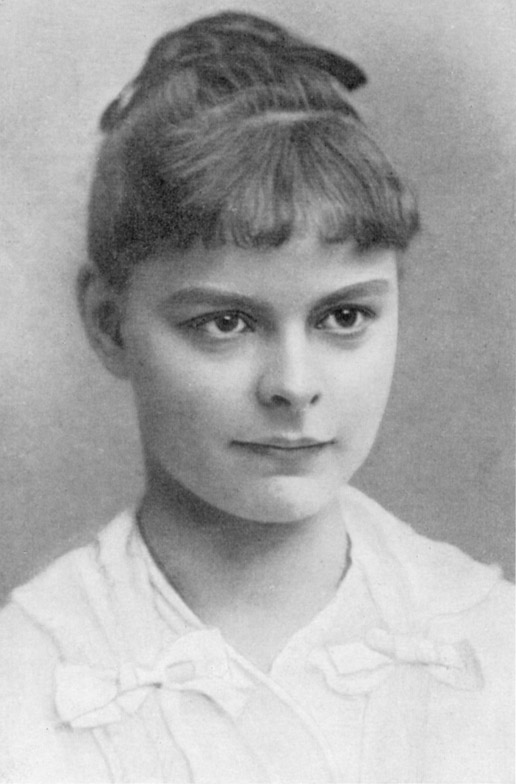
Helene Christaller at the age of 17

Helene Christaller ([ˈkʁɪstalɐ], née Heyer: 31 January 1872, in Darmstadt – 24 May 1953, in Jugenheim/Bergstraße) was a German Protestant writer mostly of youth books, especially for girls. During the Nazi-Era her books were not printed because of their Christian tenor.

== Literary works ==
- Gottfried Erdmann, 1908
- Heilige Liebe, 1911
- Verborgenheit, 1920
- Das Tagebuch der Annette, 1926
- Ein gefülltes Leben, 1939
- Eine Lebensgeschichte, 1942
