= Karel Šebor =

Czech composer

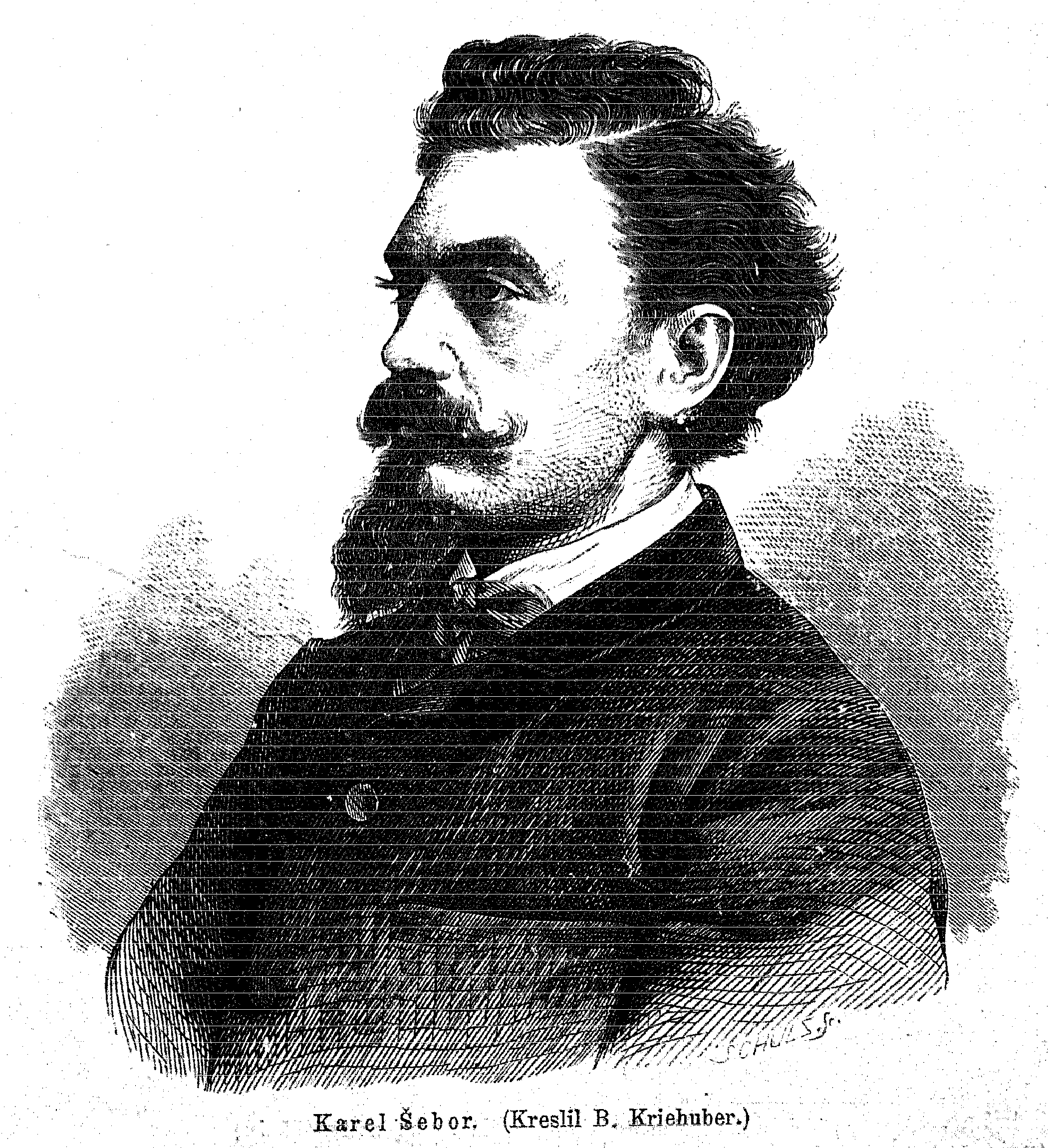
Karel Šebor (1868), by Friedrich Kriehuber

Karel Richard Šebor (13 August 1843 – 18 May 1903) was a Czech opera composer.

== Life ==
He was born in Brandýs nad Labem and raised by his grandfather, a teacher who discovered his musical talent. Šebor attended the Prague Conservatory from the age of twelve and, inspired by Beethoven's Symphony No. 9, had a first own symphony performed in 1859. From 1861 he worked as a music teacher in Warsaw, but left during the 1863 January Uprising to work as a Kapellmeister in Erfurt.

Back in Prague, he became music director at the National Theatre and had his first resounding success at the age of 22 with The Templars in Moravia. Likewise, his second and third opera Drahomíra and Nevěsta husitská ("The Hussite Bride") were well received. However, in 1871 he fell out with the theatre management and took up a post at the Lemberg Theatre. Afterwards his success faded and he was largely forgotten. He spent his later years as a military band director in the Austro-Hungarian Army.

Šebor did not retire to private life until half a year before his death in 1903. He died in Vinohrady, Prague.

== Operas ==
- 1865 Templáři na Moravě ("The Templars in Moravia"), libretto by Karel Sabina
- 1867 Drahomíra
- 1868 Nevěsta husitská ("The Hussite Bride")
- 1870 Blanka
- 1879 Zmařená svatba ("The Ruined Wedding")
