= Sangi Dari Bubak =

Sangi Dari Bubak سنگي دري بوبك
- Village
- Location within Iran
- Coordinates: 31°50′10″N 59°39′41″E
- Country: Iran
- Province: South Khorasan
- County: Nehbandan
- Bakhsh: Central
- Rural District: Meyghan

Population (2006)
  - Total: 43
- Time zone: UTC+3:30 (IRST)
  - Summer (DST): UTC+4:30 (IRDT)

Sangi Dari Bubak (Persian: سنگي دري بوبك, also Romanized as Sangī Darī Būbaḵ; also known as Sang-e Darī and Sangi Dari) is a village in Meyghan Rural District, in the Central District of Nehbandan County, South Khorasan Province, Iran. At the 2006 census, its population was 43, in 10 families.
