= Seeheim-Jugenheim =

- Municipality
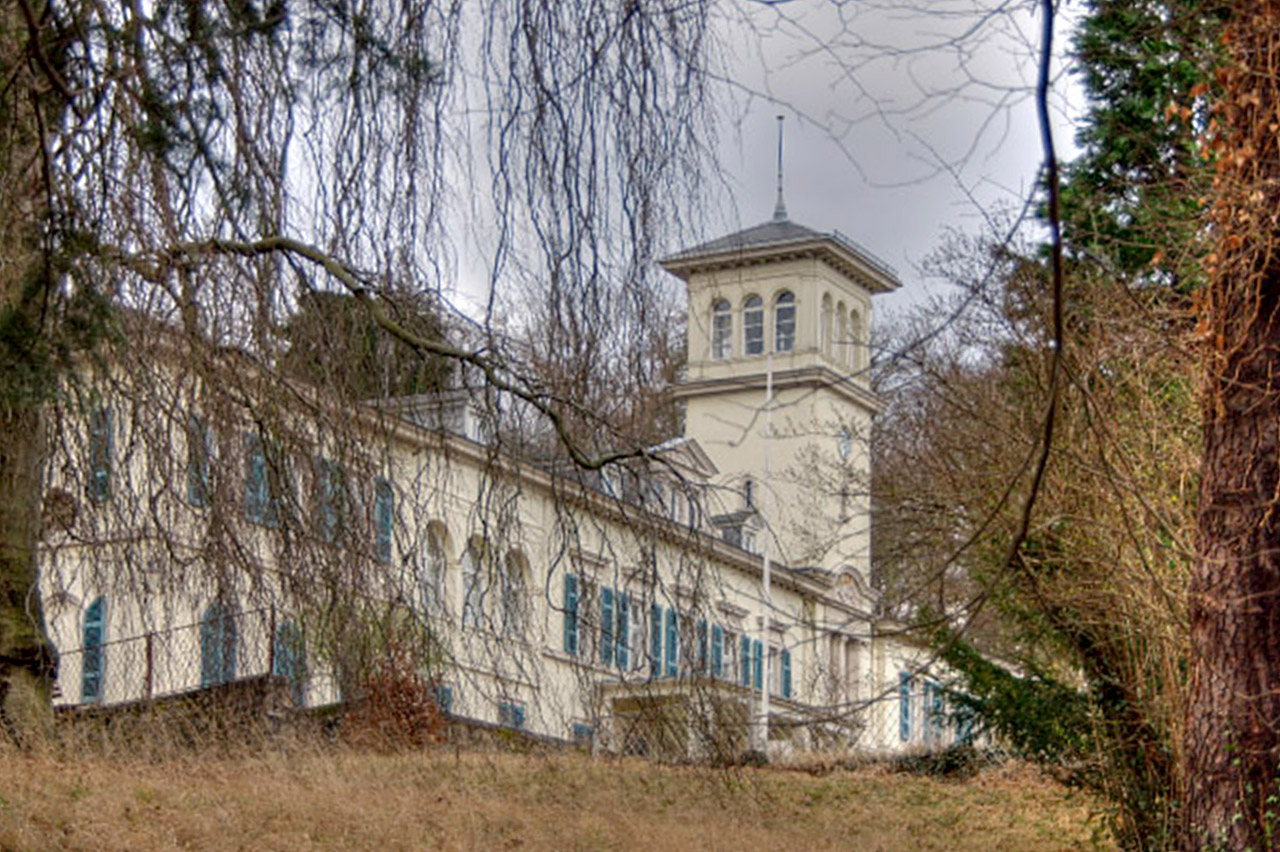
- Castle Heiligenberg was frequently visited by the Tsar

- Coat of arms

- Location of Seeheim-Jugenheim within Darmstadt-Dieburg district
- Interactive map of Seeheim-Jugenheim
- Location within Germany Location within Hesse
- Coordinates: 49°45′N 08°39′E
- Country: Germany
- State: Hesse
- Admin. region: Darmstadt
- District: Darmstadt-Dieburg

Government
  - Mayor (2023–29): Birgit Kannegießer (SPD)

Area
  - Total: 28 km^{2} (11 sq mi)
- Elevation: 224 m (735 ft)

Population (2025-12-31)
  - Total: 16,376
  - Density: 580/km^{2} (1,500/sq mi)
- Time zone: UTC+01:00 (CET)
  - Summer (DST): UTC+02:00 (CEST)
- Postal codes: 64342
- Dialling codes: 06257, 06151
- Vehicle registration: DA
- Website: www.seeheim-jugenheim.de

Seeheim-Jugenheim is a municipality in the Darmstadt-Dieburg district in Hesse, Germany. It has a population of approximately 17,000.

Seeheim-Jugenheim consists of seven villages:

- Balkhausen (population 693)
- Jugenheim (population 4,448)
- Malchen (population 1,004)
- Ober-Beerbach (population 1,269)
- Seeheim (population 9,060)
- Steigerts (population 81)
- Stettbach (population 144)

The municipality was formed on 1 January 1977 through the unification of the previously separate municipalities of Seeheim and Jugenheim. Until 1 January 1978 the municipality was known as Seeheim; after that it became known as Seeheim-Jugenheim.

It is known for its mountain bike trails to the nearby mountain Melibokus.

Seeheim-Jugenheim has been home to several notable residents throughout history, including Tsar Nicholas II of Russia as well as writers Georg Kaiser and Helene Christaller.

Further it has been an ancient Jewish Community.

Industrial and commercial activity in Seeheim-Jugenheim is close to nonexistent; thus, most of its residents work in the nearby cities of Darmstadt, Frankfurt or Heidelberg.

The local football team is called Spielvereiningung Seeheim Jugenheim.

== Notable people ==
- Christian Alvart (born 1974), German filmmaker
- Georg-Christof Bertsch (born 1959), German designer
- Walter Christaller (1893–1969), German geographer
- Hans-Joachim Heist (born 1949), German actor and comedian
- Eleonore Marguerre (born 1978), German opera singer
- Uwe Scholz (1958–2004), German ballet dancer and choreographer
- Gabriele Britz (born 1968), German jurist

== Buildings and parks ==
- Schloss Heligenberg
- Burg Tannenberg
- Altes Rathaus
- Goldschmidts Park
- Schuldorf Bergstrasse
- Schloss Seeheim

== See also ==
- Guggenheim (disambiguation)
- State International School Seeheim

== Twin towns ==
- Villenave d'Ornon, France, since 1982
- Kosmonosy, Czech Republic, since 1997
- Ceregnano, Italy, since 2008
- Karlovo, Bulgaria, since 2018
