= Eleonore Marguerre =

German opera singer

- Born: 8 January 1978 (age 48); Seeheim-Jugenheim, Hesse, West Germany
- Occupation: Operatic soprano
- Years active: 2006–present
- Website: www.eleonore-marguerre.de

Eleonore Marguerre (born 8 January 1978) is a German opera singer (coloratura soprano) with Belgic-French ancestors. Her roles have included La traviata, Konstanze in Die Entführung aus dem Serail, and the title role in Aribert Reimann's Melusine.

== Career ==
In 2006 she made her debut as Venus in Mozart's Ascanio in Alba at Teatro alla Scala. She performed in 2007 at the Grand Théâtre de Genève and in 2008 at the Tokyo City Opera. In 2009 she performed the role of Juliette in Korngold's Die tote Stadt at La Fenice.

In 2015 / 2016 Eleonore Marguerre sings Violetta and Armida in Dortmund, First Lady in The Magic Flute on a Tour with Iván Fischer to London, Amsterdam, Budapest, Brügge and Berlin.

Since 2010 the singer has performed regularly in France: Opéra National de Lorraine as Ghita in Zemlinsky's Der Zwerg, at Opéra de Nice and Opéra de Bordeaux in Mozart's Lucio Silla, Opéra de Monaco as Woglinde in Das Rheingold. Since 2011 she sings regularly at Opéra Dortmund as Contessa Almaviva in Le nozze di Figaro, Manon, Fiordiligi in Così fan tutte, Poppea in Monteverdi's L'incoronazione di Poppea, and Violetta Valéry in Verdi's La traviata.

== Prizes ==
- 2004: Competizione dell'Opera (3. Preis)
- 2006: Leyla Gencer-Gesangswettbewerb
- 2008: Marcello Viotti-Wettbewerb
- 2009: Boris Christoff-Wettbewerb

== Recordings ==
- Max Bruch, Das Lied von der Glocke, op. 45. CPO, 2005
- Franz von Suppé, Die schöne Galathée. Capriccio, 2007
- Anna-Amalia von Sachsen-Weimar, Erwin und Elmire. Deutsche Schallplatten, 2007
- Wolfgang Amadeus Mozart, Demofoonte. Arts Music, 2008
- Felix Mendelssohn Bartholdy, Lobgesang, Symphonie-Kantate op. 52. Haenssler CLASSIC, 2009
