= Josefův Důl (Mladá Boleslav District) =

- Municipality
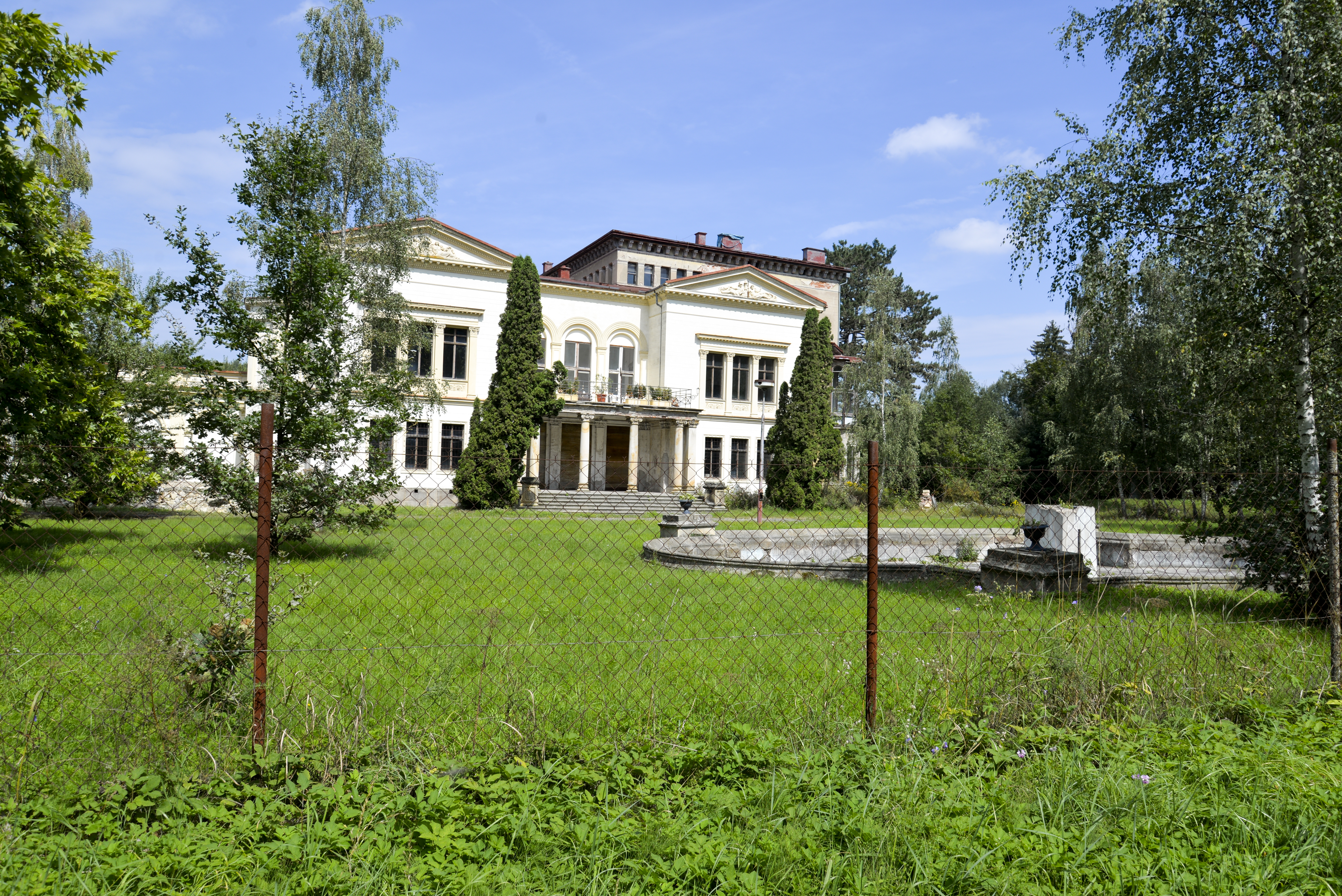
- Josefův Důl Castle

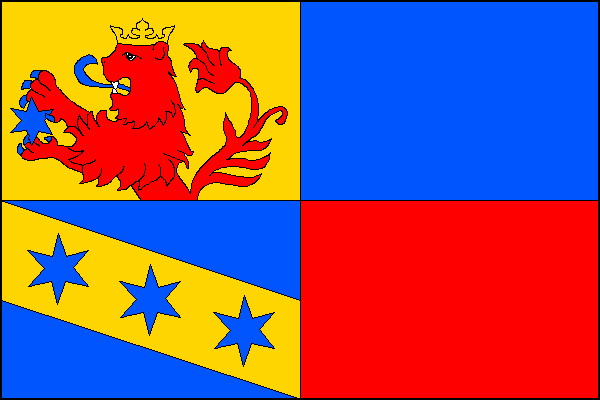
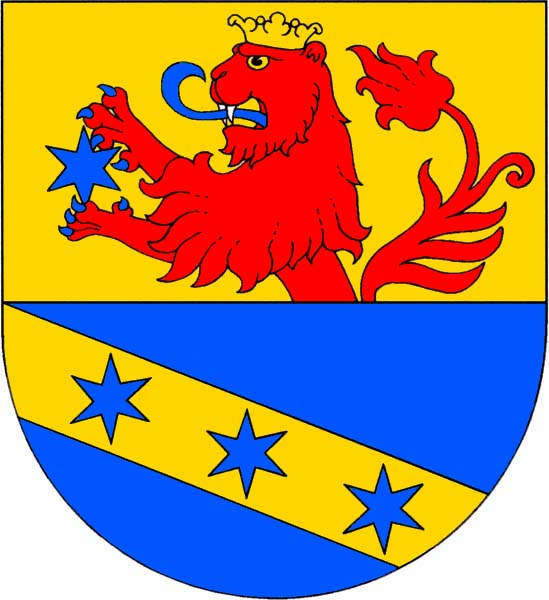
- Flag Coat of arms

- Location in the Czech Republic
- Coordinates: 50°27′12″N 14°53′38″E
- Country: Czech Republic
- Region: Central Bohemian
- District: Mladá Boleslav
- Founded: 1764

Area
  - Total: 0.66 km^{2} (0.25 sq mi)
- Elevation: 215 m (705 ft)

Population (2026-01-01)
  - Total: 441
  - Density: 670/km^{2} (1,700/sq mi)
- Time zone: UTC+1 (CET)
  - Summer (DST): UTC+2 (CEST)
- Postal code: 293 07
- Website: www.obec-josefuvdul.cz

Josefův Důl is a municipality and village in Mladá Boleslav District in the Central Bohemian Region of the Czech Republic. It has about 400 inhabitants.

== Etymology ==
The name means "Josef's valley" in Czech. The village was named after its founder Josef Bolza.

== Geography ==
Josefův Důl is located about 3 kilometres (2 mi) north of Mladá Boleslav and 47 km (29 mi) northeast of Prague. With an area of 0.66 km^{2} (0.25 sq mi), it belongs to the smallest municipalities in the country. It lies in the Jizera Table. The municipality is situated on the left bank of the Jizera River, in a meander, which forms the northern and western municipal border.

== History ==
The area originally belonged to Kosmonosy, which was bought by Countess Marie Johana Bolza-Martinic in 1760. Josefův Důl was founded as a workers' colony in 1764, when a dyehouse was established here by Count Josef Bolza and its employees settled in its vicinity. The name Josefův Důl first appeared in 1790.

== Demographics ==
Historical population

Year	Pop.	±%
1869	254	—
1880	374	+47.2%
1890	371	−0.8%
1900	372	+0.3%
1910	427	+14.8%

Year	Pop.	±%
1921	317	−25.8%
1930	426	+34.4%
1950	406	−4.7%
1961	493	+21.4%
1970	512	+3.9%

Year	Pop.	±%
1980	447	−12.7%
1991	381	−14.8%
2001	451	+18.4%
2011	430	−4.7%
2021	388	−9.8%

Source: Censuses

== Transport ==
There are no railways or major roads passing through the municipality.

== Sights ==
The most valuable building in Josefův Důl is the so-called Josefův Důl Castle. It is a Neo-Renaissance villa built after 1860 for the then owner of the local factory, Friedrich von Leitenberger.
