= Lauter (Odenwald) =

River in Germany

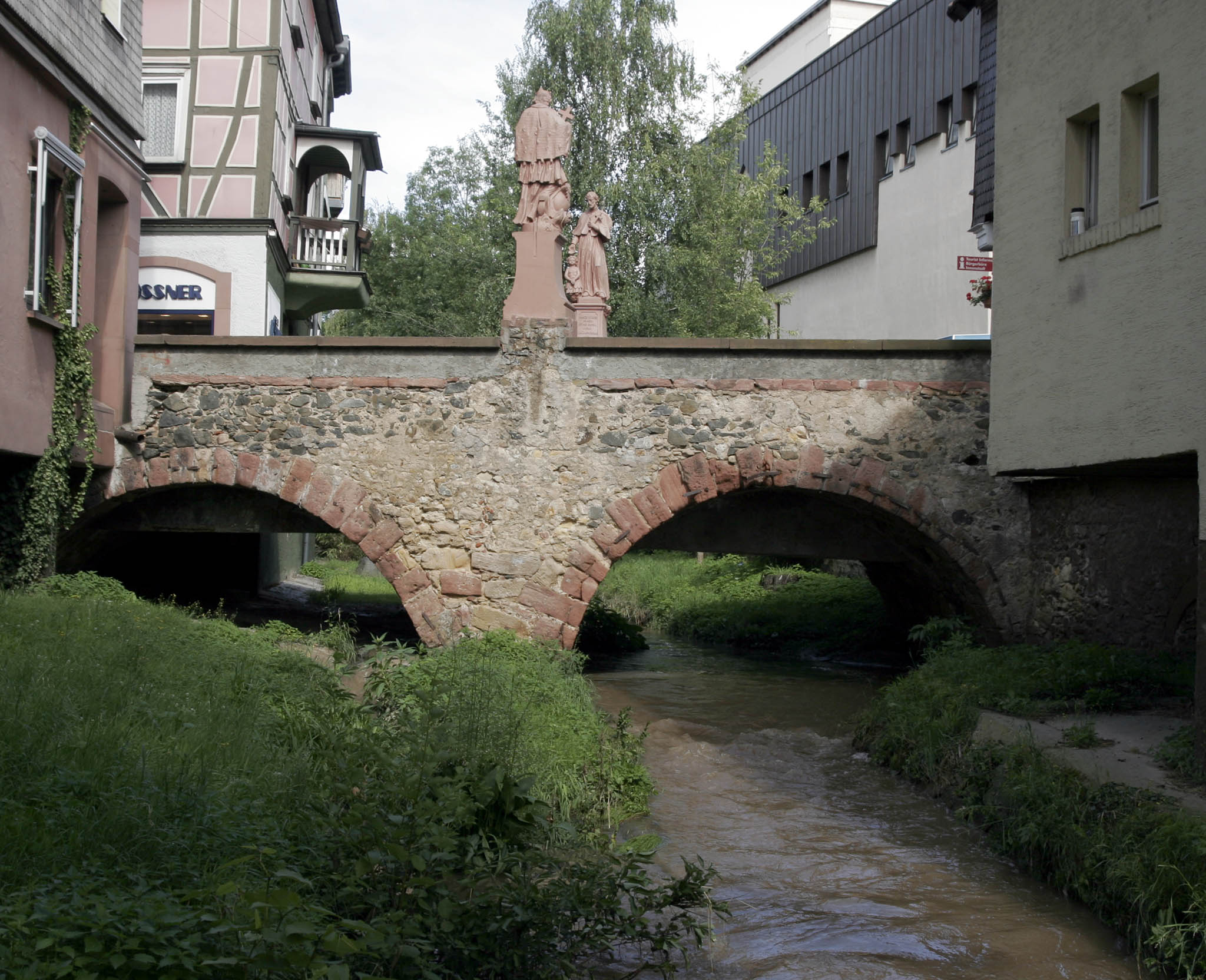

Location
- Country: Germany
- State: Hesse

Physical characteristics
- Mouth
  - location: Rhine
  - coordinates: 49.7519°N 8.4722°E
- Length: 32.5 km (20.2 mi)
- Basin size: 118 km^{2} (46 sq mi)

Basin features
- Progression: Rhine→ North Sea

Lauter (German pronunciation: [ˈlaʊtɐ]; in its lower course: Winkelbach) is a river of Hesse, Germany. Its source is in the Odenwald near Gadernheim. It passes through Bensheim and flows into the Rhine in Gernsheim.

== See also ==
- List of rivers of Hesse
