= Alois Bubák =

Czech painter (1824–1870)

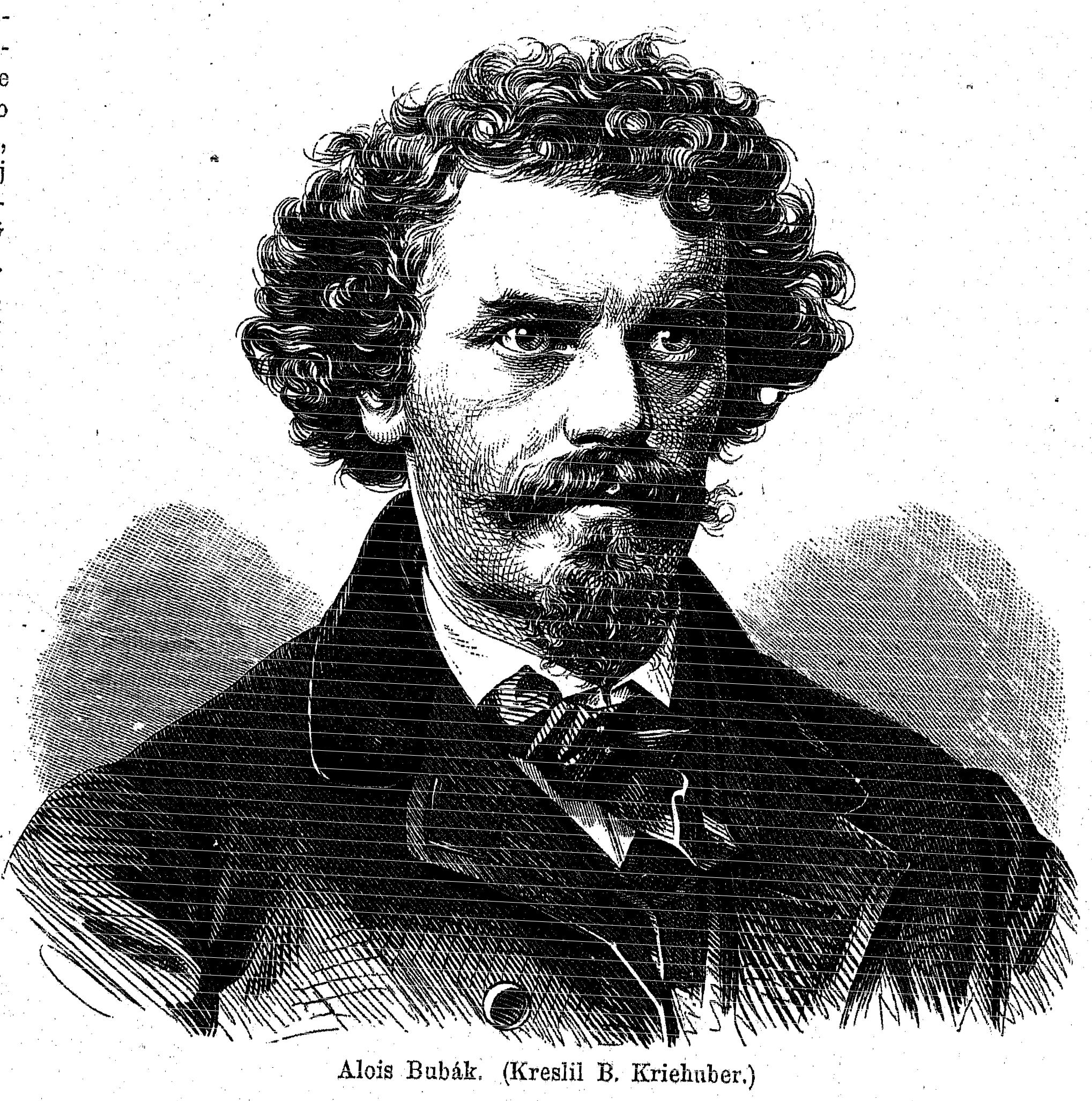
Bubák by Friedrich Kriehuber, 1870

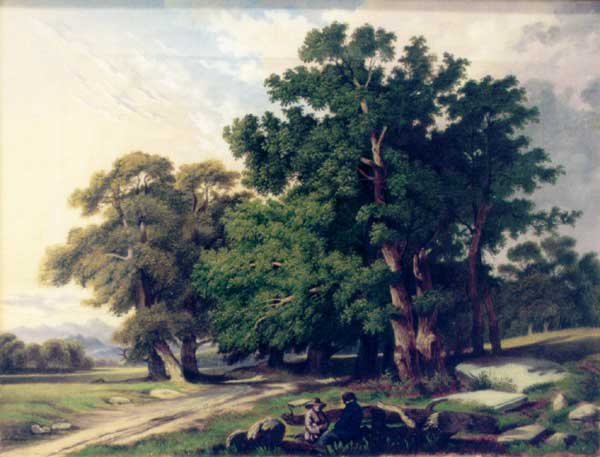
Forest trail by Alois Bubák

Alois Bubák (20 August 1824 – 6 March 1870) was a Czech landscape painter and illustrator.

== Life and work ==
Bubák was born on 20 August 1824 in Kosmonosy. He was a son of a wood carver. After graduating from a gymnasium in Mladá Boleslav, he started to study at a college of theology in Prague on the wish of his parents. However, his talent and love of art soon brought him to the Academy of Fine Arts in Prague. His teachers were Mr. Ruben, director of the academy, and Maximilian Joseph Haushofer, a landscape painter. Both appreciated his fast progress and his desire for an original artistic expression.

He focused on landscape art. As a student, he travelled to the Giant Mountains, the Alps and southwest Bohemia. He then successfully presented his works on several exhibitions. The famous ones included Landscape around the Elbe, Landscape under Studničov, Gossau Lake and two paintings from Bad Ischl area. Emperor Ferdinand I of Austria bought his depiction of Holná pond (Note: today within the Ratiboř municipality) in South Bohemia. Critics also appreciated his Plökenstein Lake in Bohemian Forest, (Note: Presently called Plešné.) for its realism, detail in the front and broad perspective in the rear. According to them, this painting overpassed those of his teacher Haushofer. Other famous landscapes included Rainy weather in the Alps, Bezděz Area, (Note: Includes Bezděz Castle.) Around Trosky (Note: Trosky Castle is a ruin in Bohemian Paradise area) and others.

Apart from creating oil paintings and aquarelles, he also taught painting at a business academy and at a high school for girls in Prague. He contributed many illustrations to Květy and Světozor magazines (e.g., Letohrádek Hvězda and castle in Strakonice).

He was very active and hard-working, painting and teaching tirelessly to support his large family. The persistent strain and a lack of rest contributed to his contracting of tuberculosis in the summer of 1868 and his premature death two years later.

Bubák died in Prague on 6 March 1870. He is buried at the Olšany Cemetery in Prague.
