= Heinrich Reschauer =

Austrian journalist and politician

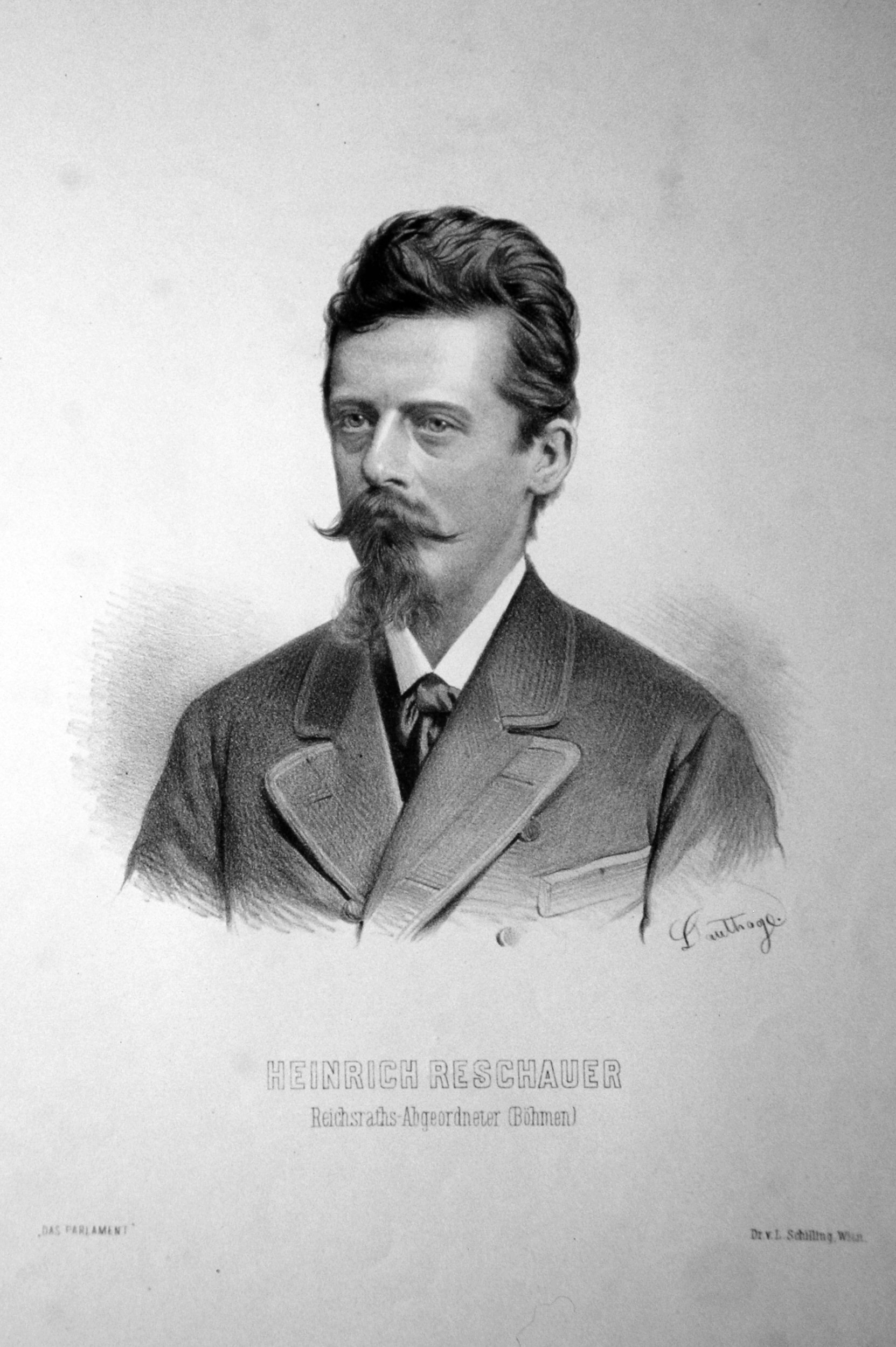
Heinrich Reschauer; lithograph by Adolf Dauthage (c. 1880)

Heinrich Reschauer (3 October 1838, Vienna – 1 September 1888, Neulengbach) was an Austrian journalist and politician.

== Biography ==
He came from a petite bourgeoisie family that lost everything they owned during the Revolution of 1848. As a result, he was unable to finish his education and found employment as a bookseller. This led to an involvement in journalism. In 1861 he published The Tasks of German Austria after February 26, 1861, the date that a new constitution, known as the "February Patent" was established. During the course of promoting this work, he became close friends with the publicist, Franz Schuselka, who helped him obtain a position on the editorial board of Der Wanderer, a daily newspaper.

Shortly after, he became the Viennese correspondent for Die Volksstimme (The People's Voice), a newspaper in Graz. He eventually was promoted to editor-in-chief. He returned briefly to Der Wanderer then, in 1863, took over the editorial board of Die Morgen-Post. In 1867, together with Heinrich Pollak and Moritz Szeps, he co-founded the Neues Wiener Tagblatt. After 1872, he worked in the editorial offices of the Deutsche Zeitung. From 1875 to 1886, he was their editor-in-chief and publisher.

He also wrote historical works, the best known of which is Das jahr 1848. Geschichte der Wiener revolution (1872), a two volume history of the Vienna Uprising. The second volume was written together with Moritz Smetazko, known as "Moritz Smets" (1828–1890), a freelance history writer.

In addition to his journalistic work, he was politically active. From 1873 to 1878, he sat on the Vienna Gemeinderat (Municipal Council). He was aligned with the Constitutional Party and promoted programs favorable to small business owners. In the 1880s, he also served as a member of the Imperial Council.

He died at his summer home in the Sankt Pölten-Land District, leaving behind a wife and five children, but very little in the way of an estate.
