= Felsberg (Odenwald) =

Coordinates: 49°43′50″N 8°41′02″E

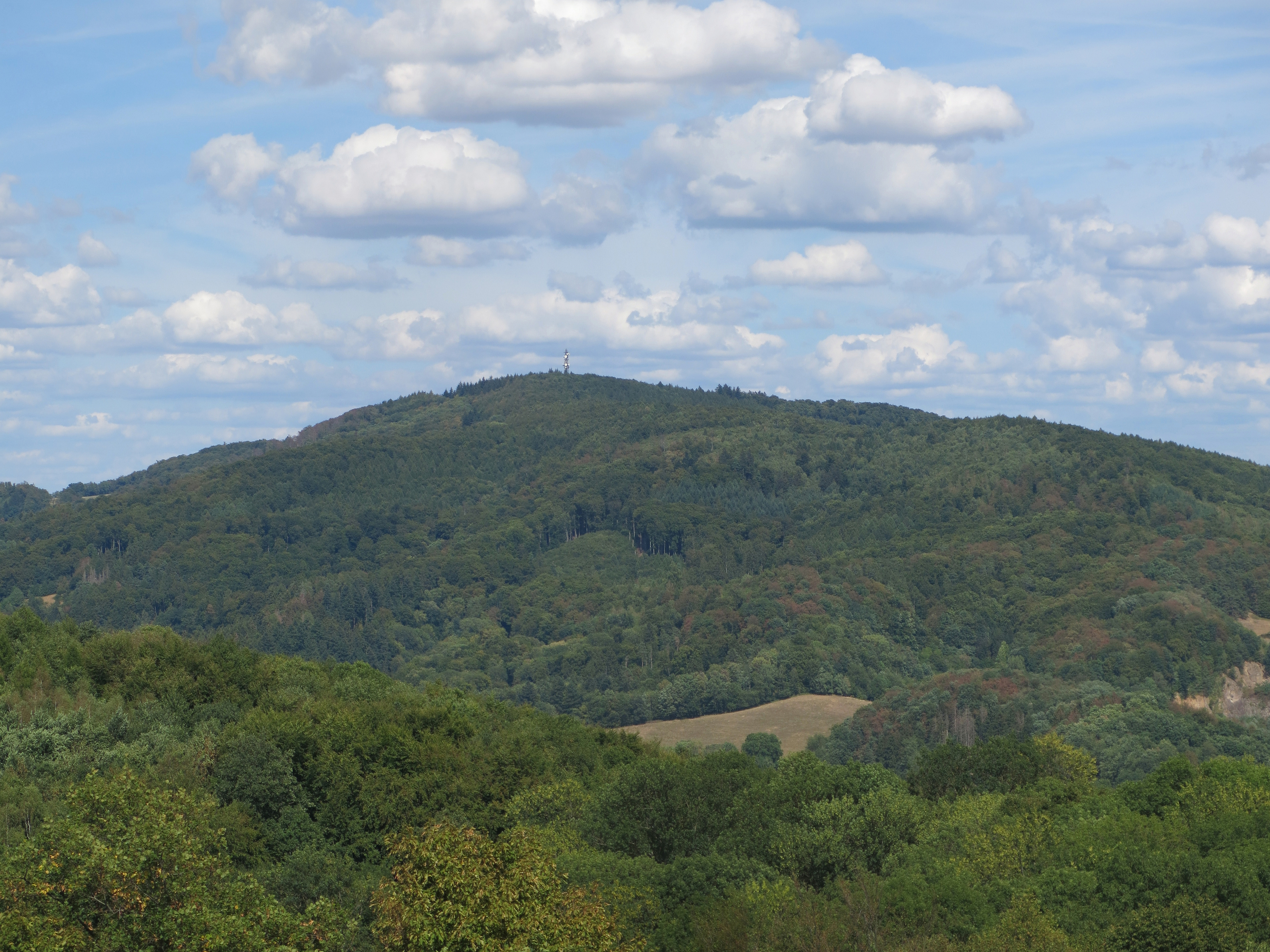
- Felsberg, seen from Auerbach Castle

Highest point
- Elevation: 514 m (1,686 ft)

Geography
- Location: Hesse, Germany

The Felsberg (German pronunciation: [ˈfɛlsˌbɛʁk]) is a hill (1686,35 ft. above sea level) in the Odenwald range in Hesse, Germany.

== Gallery ==
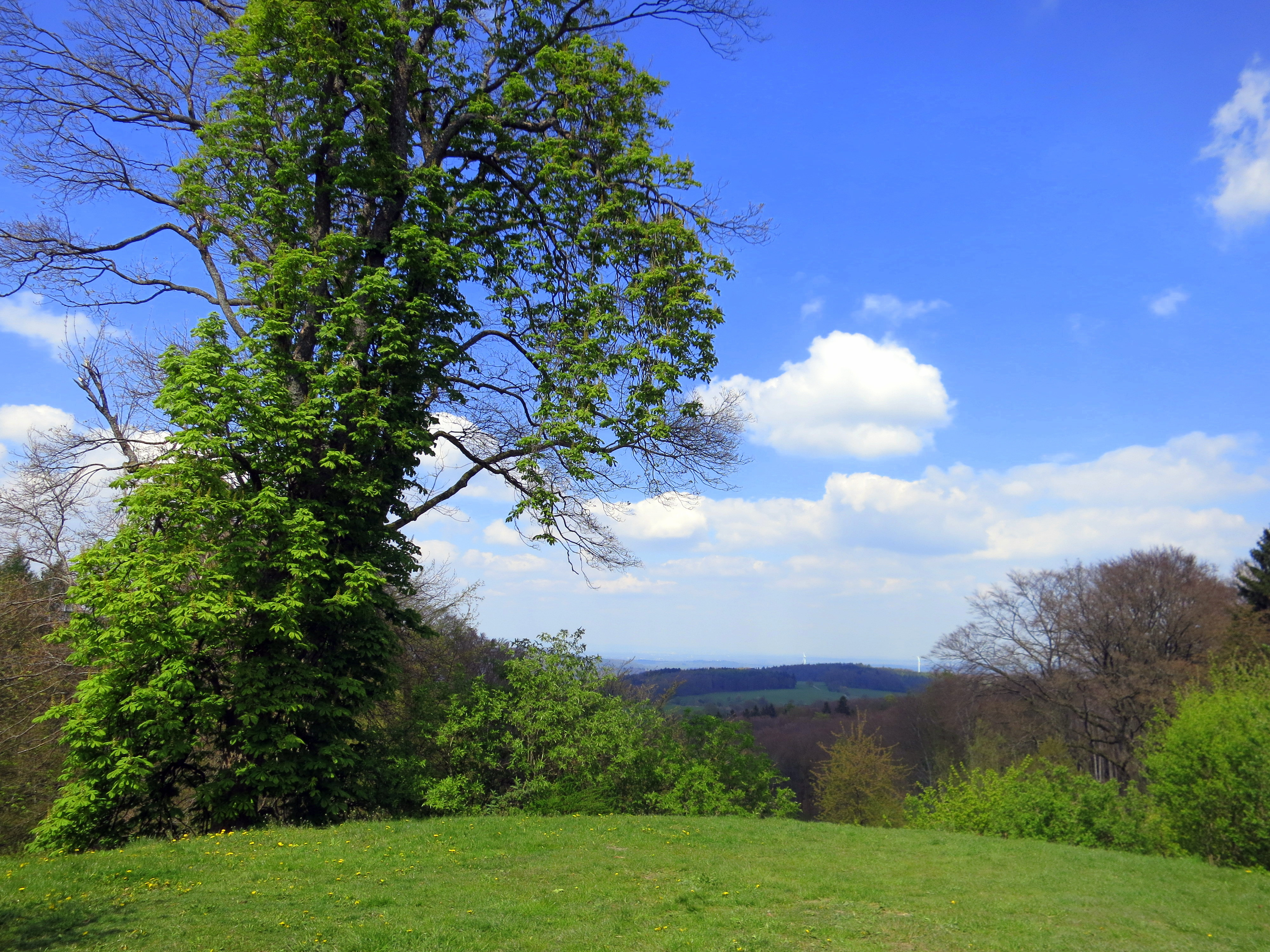
View from the Felsberg (Odenwald)

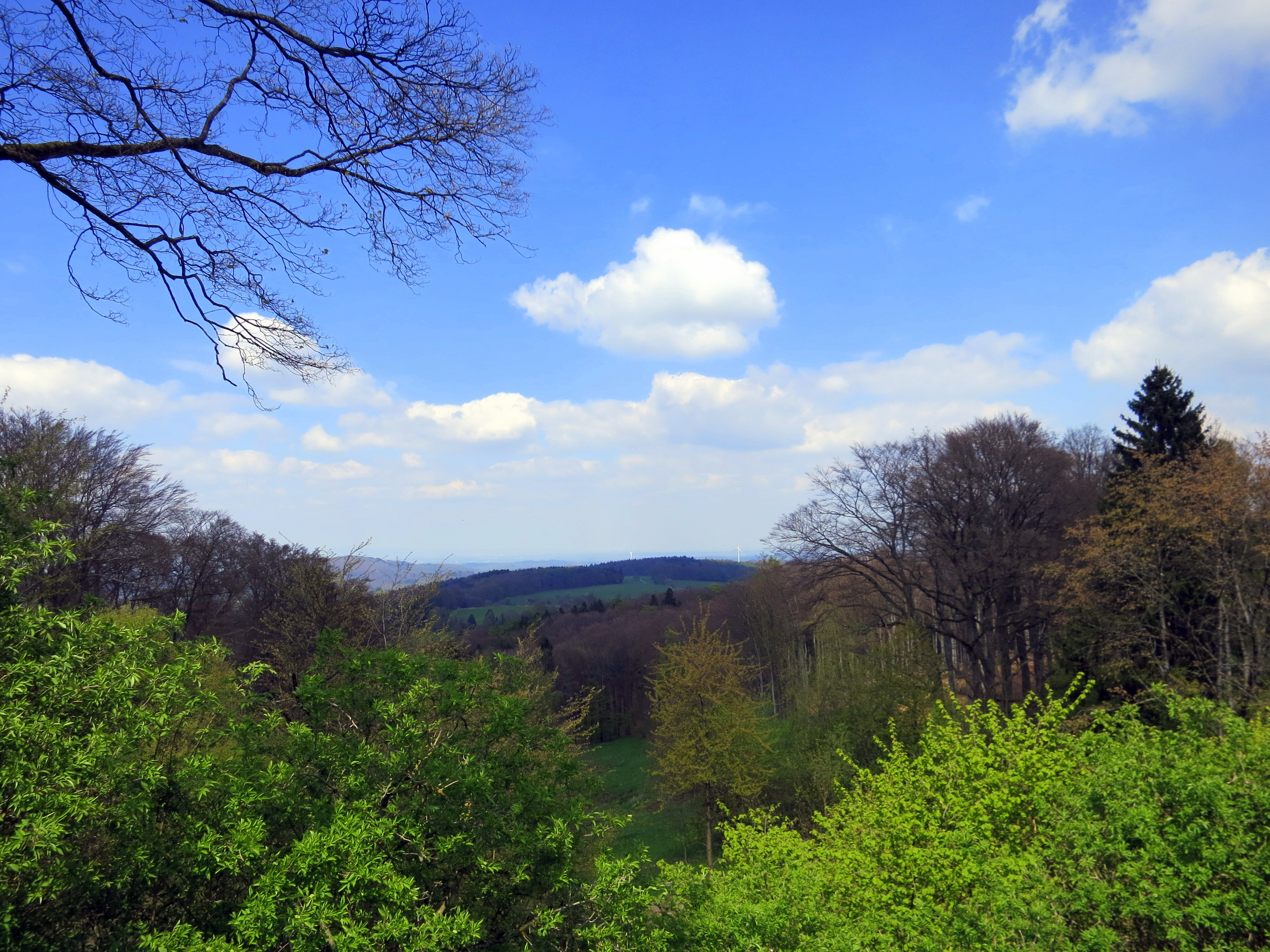
View from the Felsberg (Odenwald)

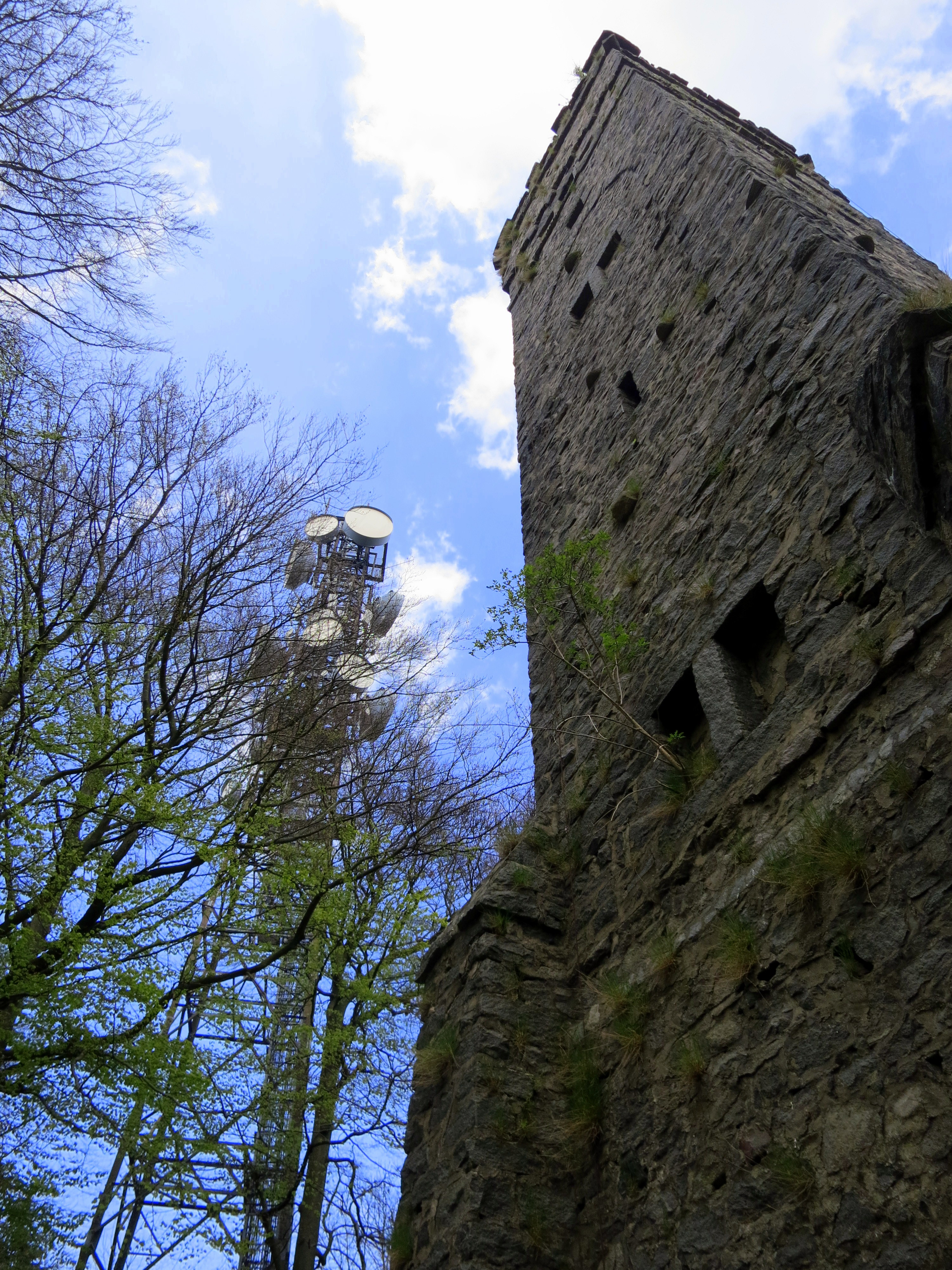
The Ohlyturm and Transmitter mast on the Felsberg (Odenwald)

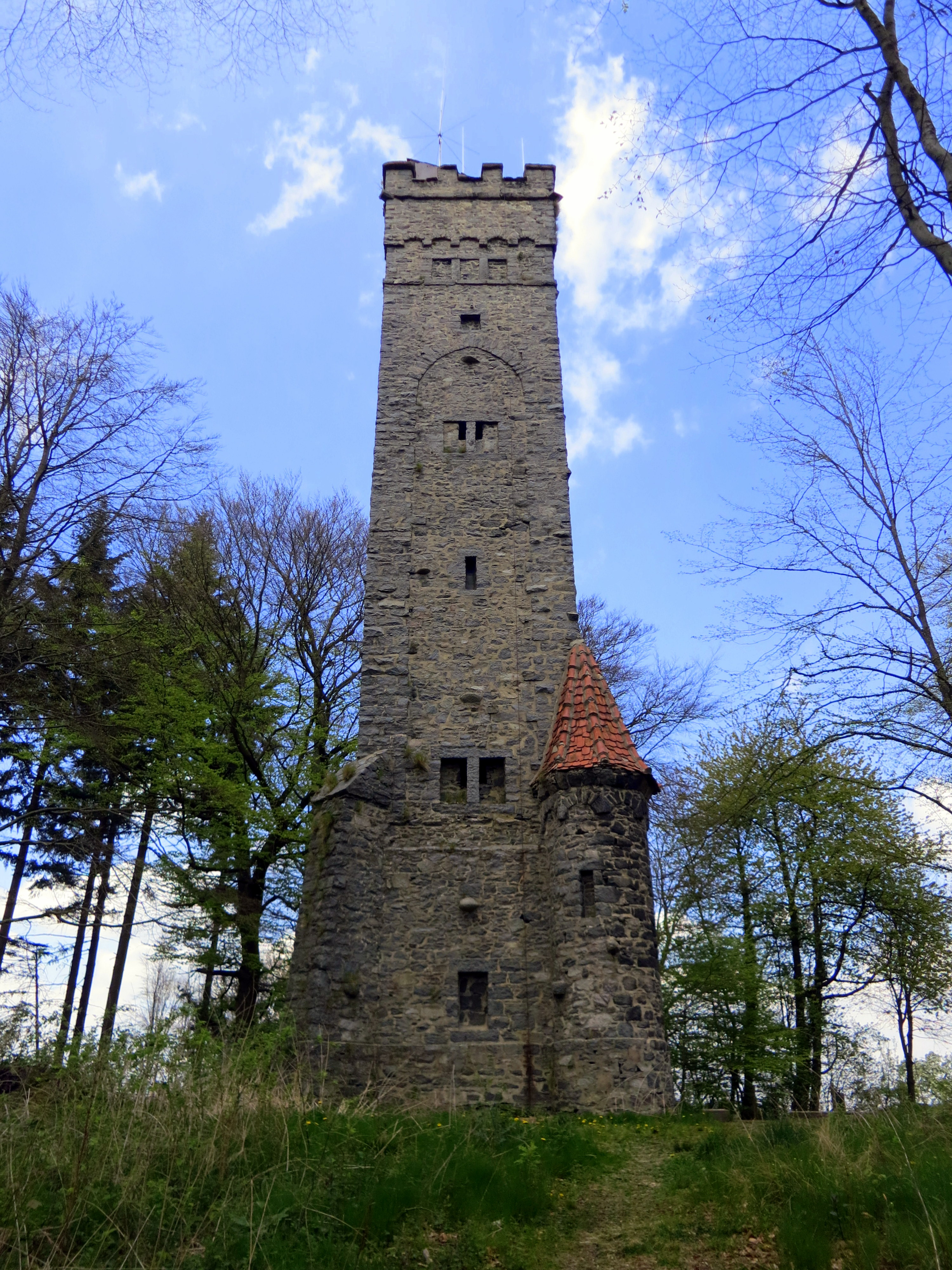
The Ohlyturm is the landmark of the Felsberg (Odenwald)

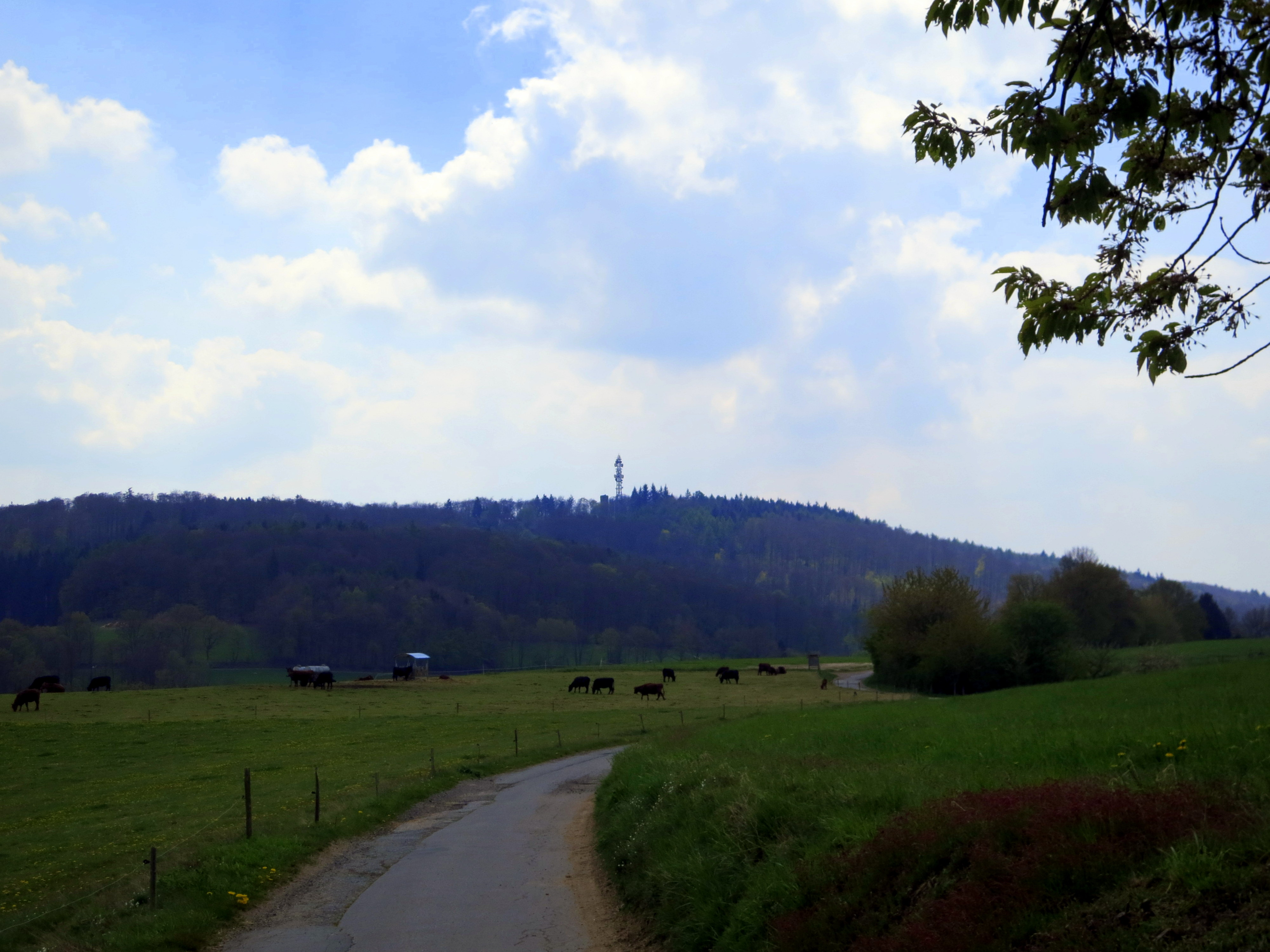
The view of Felsberg (Odenwald) from Hutzelstraße (Hutzelstreet) (2017)
