= Darmstadt (electoral district) =

Federal electoral district of Germany

185 Darmstadt
- Electoral district for the Bundestag
- Darmstadt in 2025
- State: Hesse
- Population: 349,900 (2019)
- Electorate: 240,763 (2021)
- Major settlements: Darmstadt; Griesheim; Weiterstadt
- Area: 449.3 km^{2}

Current electoral district
- Created: 1949
- Member: Vacant
- Elected: 2025

Darmstadt is an electoral constituency (German: Wahlkreis) represented in the Bundestag. It elects one member via first-past-the-post voting. Under the current constituency numbering system, it is designated as constituency 185. It is located in southern Hesse, comprising the city of Darmstadt and surrounding parts of the Darmstadt-Dieburg district.

Darmstadt was created for the inaugural 1949 federal election. From 2021 to 2025, it was represented by Andreas Larem of the Social Democratic Party (SPD).

== Geography ==
Darmstadt is located in southern Hesse. As of the 2021 federal election, it comprises the independent city of Darmstadt and the municipalities of Alsbach-Hähnlein, Bickenbach, Eppertshausen, Erzhausen, Griesheim, Messel, Modautal, Mühltal, Münster (Hessen), Ober-Ramstadt, Pfungstadt, Roßdorf, Seeheim-Jugenheim, and Weiterstadt from the Darmstadt-Dieburg district.

== History ==
Darmstadt was created in 1949. In the 1949 election, it was Hesse constituency 20 in the numbering system. From 1953 through 1976, it was number 145. From 1980 through 1998, it was number 143. In the 2002 and 2005 elections, it was number 187. In the 2009 through 2021 elections, it was number 186. From the 2025 election, it has been number 185.

Originally, the constituency comprised the independent city of Darmstadt and the Landkreis Darmstadt district. In the 1976 through 1998 elections, it acquired a configuration very similar to its current borders, but excluding the municipalities of Eppertshausen and Münster (Hessen) from the Darmstadt-Dieburg district. It acquired its current borders in the 2002 election.

Election	No.	Name	Borders
1949	20	Darmstadt	Darmstadt city; Landkreis Darmstadt district
1953	145	Darmstadt	Darmstadt city; Landkreis Darmstadt district
1957	145	Darmstadt	Darmstadt city; Landkreis Darmstadt district
1961	145	Darmstadt	Darmstadt city; Landkreis Darmstadt district
1965	145	Darmstadt	Darmstadt city; Landkreis Darmstadt district
1969	145	Darmstadt	Darmstadt city; Landkreis Darmstadt district
1972	145	Darmstadt	Darmstadt city; Landkreis Darmstadt district
1976	145	Darmstadt	Darmstadt city; Darmstadt-Dieburg district (only Alsbach-Hähnlein, Bickenbach, Erzhausen, Griesheim, Messel, Modautal, Mühltal, Ober-Ramstadt, Pfungstadt, Roßdorf, Seeheim-Jugenheim, and Weiterstadt municipalities)
1980	143	Darmstadt	Darmstadt city; Darmstadt-Dieburg district (only Alsbach-Hähnlein, Bickenbach, Erzhausen, Griesheim, Messel, Modautal, Mühltal, Ober-Ramstadt, Pfungstadt, Roßdorf, Seeheim-Jugenheim, and Weiterstadt municipalities)
1983	143	Darmstadt	Darmstadt city; Darmstadt-Dieburg district (only Alsbach-Hähnlein, Bickenbach, Erzhausen, Griesheim, Messel, Modautal, Mühltal, Ober-Ramstadt, Pfungstadt, Roßdorf, Seeheim-Jugenheim, and Weiterstadt municipalities)
1987	143	Darmstadt	Darmstadt city; Darmstadt-Dieburg district (only Alsbach-Hähnlein, Bickenbach, Erzhausen, Griesheim, Messel, Modautal, Mühltal, Ober-Ramstadt, Pfungstadt, Roßdorf, Seeheim-Jugenheim, and Weiterstadt municipalities)
1990	143	Darmstadt	Darmstadt city; Darmstadt-Dieburg district (only Alsbach-Hähnlein, Bickenbach, Erzhausen, Griesheim, Messel, Modautal, Mühltal, Ober-Ramstadt, Pfungstadt, Roßdorf, Seeheim-Jugenheim, and Weiterstadt municipalities)
1994	143	Darmstadt	Darmstadt city; Darmstadt-Dieburg district (only Alsbach-Hähnlein, Bickenbach, Erzhausen, Griesheim, Messel, Modautal, Mühltal, Ober-Ramstadt, Pfungstadt, Roßdorf, Seeheim-Jugenheim, and Weiterstadt municipalities)
1998	143	Darmstadt	Darmstadt city; Darmstadt-Dieburg district (only Alsbach-Hähnlein, Bickenbach, Erzhausen, Griesheim, Messel, Modautal, Mühltal, Ober-Ramstadt, Pfungstadt, Roßdorf, Seeheim-Jugenheim, and Weiterstadt municipalities)
2002	187	Darmstadt	Darmstadt city; Darmstadt-Dieburg district (only Alsbach-Hähnlein, Bickenbach, Eppertshausen, Erzhausen, Griesheim, Messel, Modautal, Mühltal, Münster (Hessen), Ober-Ramstadt, Pfungstadt, Roßdorf, Seeheim-Jugenheim, and Weiterstadt municipalities)
2005	187	Darmstadt	Darmstadt city; Darmstadt-Dieburg district (only Alsbach-Hähnlein, Bickenbach, Eppertshausen, Erzhausen, Griesheim, Messel, Modautal, Mühltal, Münster (Hessen), Ober-Ramstadt, Pfungstadt, Roßdorf, Seeheim-Jugenheim, and Weiterstadt municipalities)
2009	186	Darmstadt	Darmstadt city; Darmstadt-Dieburg district (only Alsbach-Hähnlein, Bickenbach, Eppertshausen, Erzhausen, Griesheim, Messel, Modautal, Mühltal, Münster (Hessen), Ober-Ramstadt, Pfungstadt, Roßdorf, Seeheim-Jugenheim, and Weiterstadt municipalities)
2013	186	Darmstadt	Darmstadt city; Darmstadt-Dieburg district (only Alsbach-Hähnlein, Bickenbach, Eppertshausen, Erzhausen, Griesheim, Messel, Modautal, Mühltal, Münster (Hessen), Ober-Ramstadt, Pfungstadt, Roßdorf, Seeheim-Jugenheim, and Weiterstadt municipalities)
2017	186	Darmstadt	Darmstadt city; Darmstadt-Dieburg district (only Alsbach-Hähnlein, Bickenbach, Eppertshausen, Erzhausen, Griesheim, Messel, Modautal, Mühltal, Münster (Hessen), Ober-Ramstadt, Pfungstadt, Roßdorf, Seeheim-Jugenheim, and Weiterstadt municipalities)
2021	186	Darmstadt	Darmstadt city; Darmstadt-Dieburg district (only Alsbach-Hähnlein, Bickenbach, Eppertshausen, Erzhausen, Griesheim, Messel, Modautal, Mühltal, Münster (Hessen), Ober-Ramstadt, Pfungstadt, Roßdorf, Seeheim-Jugenheim, and Weiterstadt municipalities)
2025	185	Darmstadt	Darmstadt city; Darmstadt-Dieburg district (only Alsbach-Hähnlein, Bickenbach, Eppertshausen, Erzhausen, Griesheim, Messel, Modautal, Mühltal, Münster (Hessen), Ober-Ramstadt, Pfungstadt, Roßdorf, Seeheim-Jugenheim, and Weiterstadt municipalities)

== Members ==
The constituency has been held by the Social Democratic Party (SPD) during all but three Bundestag terms since its creation. It was first represented by Richard Hammer of the Free Democratic Party (FDP) from 1949 to 1953. Ludwig Metzger of the SPD was elected in 1953 and served until 1969. He was succeeded by Günther Metzger from 1969 to 1976, followed by Reinhold Staudt for one term. Helga Timm then represented it from 1980 to 1990. Eike Ebert served a single term from 1990 to 1994. Andreas Storm of the Christian Democratic Union (CDU) won it in 1994 and served until 1998, when Walter Hoffmann regained it for the SPD. Brigitte Zypries was representative from 2005 to 2017. Astrid Mannes of the CDU was elected in 2017. Andreas Larem of the SPD was elected in 2021.

Election	Member	Party	%
1949	Richard Hammer	FDP	36.8
1953	Ludwig Metzger	SPD	42.5
1957	Ludwig Metzger	SPD	43.0
1961	Ludwig Metzger	SPD	44.6
1965	Ludwig Metzger	SPD	48.4
1969	Günther Metzger	SPD	54.2
1972	Günther Metzger	SPD	56.4
1976	Reinhold Staudt	SPD	48.4
1980	Helga Timm	SPD	49.2
1983	Helga Timm	SPD	46.1
1987	Helga Timm	SPD	42.7
1990	Eike Ebert	SPD	39.3
1994	Andreas Storm	CDU	40.5
1998	Walter Hoffmann	SPD	46.7
2002	Walter Hoffmann	SPD	48.4
2005	Brigitte Zypries	SPD	44.8
2009	Brigitte Zypries	SPD	35.0
2013	Brigitte Zypries	SPD	37.3
2017	Astrid Mannes	CDU	30.7
2021	Andreas Larem	SPD	27.4
2025	Vacant (Note: Astrid Mannes (CDU) won with 26.7% but seat remained vacant due to insufficient second votes cover.)		

== Election results ==
=== 2025 election ===
Federal election (2025): Darmstadt
Notes:	Blue background denotes the winner of the electorate vote. Pink background denotes a candidate elected from their party list. Yellow background denotes an electorate win by a list member, or other incumbent. A ✓ or ✗ denotes status of any incumbent, win or lose respectively.						
Party	Candidate	Votes	%	±%	Party votes	%	±%
CDU	Astrid Mannes	53,801	26.7	▲4.0	48,719	24.2	▲5.7
Greens	Philip Krämer	43,629	21.7	▼2.1	38,495	19.1	▼3.3
SPD	✗ Andreas Larem	42,398	21.1	▼6.3	37,368	18.5	▼7.8
AfD	Anja Swars	27,391	13.6	▲7.6	22,541	13.6	▲7.1
Left	Jakob Migenda	15,384	7.6	▲2.6	22,541	11.2	▲5.4
FDP	Viola Gebek	6,626	3.3	▼5.9	9,664	4.8	▼7.1
BSW					8,991	4.5	New
Volt	Ana-Lena Herrling	5,122	2.5	New	3,115	1.5	▲0.2
Tierschutzpartei	Mitja Stachowiak	2,772	1.4	New	2,246	1.1	▼0.3
FW	Stella Streit	2,038	1.0	▼0.7	1,388	0.7	▼0.5
PARTEI	Roland Hardt	1,855	0.9	▼1.1	1,142	0.6	▼0.5
BD					287	0.1	New
Humanists					249	0.1	0.0
MLPD	Anna Schupp	244	0.1	0.0	86	<0.1	0.0
Informal votes		1,748			1,274		
Total valid votes		201,260			201,734		
Turnout		203,008	84.8	▲6.3			
CDU gain from SPD	Majority	10,172	5.0	N/A			

=== 2021 election ===
Federal election (2021): Darmstadt
Notes:	Blue background denotes the winner of the electorate vote. Pink background denotes a candidate elected from their party list. Yellow background denotes an electorate win by a list member, or other incumbent. A ✓ or ✗ denotes status of any incumbent, win or lose respectively.						
Party	Candidate	Votes	%	±%	Party votes	%	±%
SPD	Andreas Larem	51,046	27.4	▲2.4	49,273	26.3	▲3.9
Greens	Daniela Wagner	44,364	23.8	▲9.6	41,958	22.4	▲8.1
CDU	✗ Astrid Mannes	42,351	22.7	▼8.0	34,472	18.4	▼9.0
FDP	Julia von Buttlar	17,192	9.2	▲3.0	22,256	11.9	▲0.9
AfD	Meysam Ehtemai	11,210	6.0	▼3.1	12,194	6.5	▼3.3
Left	Fırat Turğut-Wenzel	9,332	5.0	▼3.5	10,764	5.8	▼4.5
PARTEI	Mario Pingel	3,680	2.0		1,984	1.1	▼0.1
FW	Harald Paul Uhl	3,237	1.7	▲0.4	2,139	1.1	▲0.5
dieBasis	Gerold Hiemenz	3,129	1.7		2,679	1.4	
Tierschutzpartei					2,626	1.4	▲0.4
Volt					2,583	1.4	
Team Todenhöfer					1,450	0.8	
Pirates					846	0.5	▼0.3
Independent	Mitja Stachowiak	644	0.3				
Bündnis C					351	0.2	
ÖDP					302	0.2	▼0.1
Humanists					292	0.2	
Gesundheitsforschung					226	0.1	
NPD					165	0.1	▼0.1
V-Partei3					165	0.1	▼0.1
MLPD	Anna Schupp	269	0.1	▼0.1	107	0.1	0.0
DKP					86	0.0	0.0
Bündnis 21					63	0.0	
LKR					57	0.0	
Informal votes		2,462			1,888		
Total valid votes		186,454			187,028		
Turnout		188,916	78.5	▼0.9			
SPD gain from CDU	Majority	6,682	3.6				

=== 2017 election ===
Federal election (2017): Darmstadt
Notes:	Blue background denotes the winner of the electorate vote. Pink background denotes a candidate elected from their party list. Yellow background denotes an electorate win by a list member, or other incumbent. A ✓ or ✗ denotes status of any incumbent, win or lose respectively.						
Party	Candidate	Votes	%	±%	Party votes	%	±%
CDU	Astrid Mannes	58,216	30.7	▼5.2	52,218	27.4	▼7.5
SPD	Christel Sprößler	56,442	29.7	▼7.5	42,638	22.4	▼6.1
Greens	Daniela Wagner	26,939	14.2	▲2.5	27,317	14.3	▲0.1
AfD	Frank Karnbach	17,227	9.1	▲5.2	18,654	9.8	▲4.6
Left	Michael Friedrichs	16,146	8.5	▲3.3	19,508	10.2	▲3.5
FDP	Nicolas Wallhäußer	11,739	6.2	▲3.7	20,893	11.0	▲5.9
PARTEI					2,280	1.2	▲0.6
Tierschutzpartei					1,820	1.0	
Pirates					1,352	0.7	▼2.4
FW	Friedrich Herrmann	2,576	1.4		1,192	0.6	▲0.1
ÖDP					534	0.3	
BGE					483	0.3	
NPD					450	0.2	▼0.5
DM					409	0.2	
V-Partei³					338	0.2	
MLPD	Anna Schupp	490	0.3		186	0.1	0.0
DKP					64	0.0	
BüSo					39	0.0	0.0
Informal votes		2,733			2,133		
Total valid votes		189,775			190,375		
Turnout		192,508	79.3	▲4.0			
CDU gain from SPD	Majority	1,684	1.0				

=== 2013 election ===
Federal election (2013): Darmstadt
Notes:	Blue background denotes the winner of the electorate vote. Pink background denotes a candidate elected from their party list. Yellow background denotes an electorate win by a list member, or other incumbent. A ✓ or ✗ denotes status of any incumbent, win or lose respectively.						
Party	Candidate	Votes	%	±%	Party votes	%	±%
SPD	✓ Brigitte Zypries	65,820	37.3	▲2.2	50,416	28.5	▲3.4
CDU	Charles M. Huber	63,397	35.9	▲0.9	61,677	34.9	▲6.1
Greens	Daniela Wagner	20,704	11.7	▼0.4	25,149	14.2	▼2.9
Left	Walter Busch-Hübenbecker	9,111	5.2	▼1.3	11,866	6.7	▼1.9
AfD	Stephan Georg Weber	6,789	3.8		9,169	5.2	
Pirates	Björn Semrau	5,033	2.8	▲0.6	5,508	3.1	▲0.6
FDP	Angelika Nake	4,306	2.4	▼5.4	8,945	5.1	▼10.2
NPD	Sascha Arnold	1,437	0.8	▼0.3	1,354	0.8	▼0.1
PARTEI					991	0.6	
FW					933	0.5	
REP					303	0.2	▼0.3
PRO					154	0.1	
MLPD					96	0.1	0.0
SGP					77	0.0	
BüSo					62	0.0	▼0.1
Informal votes		4,193			4,090		
Total valid votes		176,597			176,700		
Turnout		180,790	75.3	▼0.2			
SPD hold	Majority	2,423	1.4	▲1.4			

=== 2009 election ===
Federal election (2009): Darmstadt
Notes:	Blue background denotes the winner of the electorate vote. Pink background denotes a candidate elected from their party list. Yellow background denotes an electorate win by a list member, or other incumbent. A ✓ or ✗ denotes status of any incumbent, win or lose respectively.						
Party	Candidate	Votes	%	±%	Party votes	%	±%
SPD	✓ Brigitte Zypries	60,581	35.0	▼9.8	43,605	25.1	▼11.4
CDU	Andreas Storm	60,536	35.0	▼2.7	49,924	28.8	▼1.6
Greens	Daniela Wagner	20,963	12.1	▲4.0	29,727	17.1	▲3.0
FDP	Christoph Hentzen	13,553	7.8	▲4.2	26,539	15.3	▲4.5
Left	Walter Busch-Hübenbecker	11,213	6.5	▲2.6	14,869	8.6	▲3.3
Pirates	Nicole Hornung	3,866	2.2		4,390	2.5	
Tierschutzpartei					1,650	1.0	▲0.2
NPD	Klaus Dietrich	1,860	1.1	▼0.1	1,501	0.9	0.0
REP					788	0.5	▼0.1
Independent	Adolf Breitmeier	396	0.2				
BüSo					173	0.1	0.0
DVU					132	0.1	
MLPD					87	0.1	▼0.1
Informal votes		3,467			3,050		
Total valid votes		172,968			173,385		
Turnout		176,435	75.5	▼4.3			
SPD hold	Majority	45	0.03	▼7.1			

=== 2005 election ===
Federal election (2005):Darmstadt
Notes:	Blue background denotes the winner of the electorate vote. Pink background denotes a candidate elected from their party list. Yellow background denotes an electorate win by a list member, or other incumbent. A ✓ or ✗ denotes status of any incumbent, win or lose respectively.						
Party	Candidate	Votes	%	±%	Party votes	%	±%
SPD	Brigitte Zypries	80,289	44.8	▼3.6	65,693	36.5	▼3.6
CDU	Andreas Storm	67,498	37.7	▲1.7	54,617	30.4	▼1.6
Greens	Jochen Partsch	14,557	8.1	0.0	25,435	14.1	▼1.7
Left	Heinz Schäfer	6,955	3.9	▲2.7	9,452	5.3	▲3.7
FDP	Kerstin Laabs	6,584	3.7	▼0.9	19,442	10.8	▲2.8
NPD	Klaus Dietrich	2,039	1.1		1,587	0.9	▲0.6
Tierschutzpartei					1,375	0.8	▲0.2
PBC	Harald Tilly	966	0.5				
REP					1,378	0.9	▲0.1
GRAUEN					757	0.4	▲0.2
MLPD	Karin Weber	359	0.2		196	0.1	
SGP					166	0.1	
BüSo					119	0.1	0.0
Informal votes		4,169			3,641		
Total valid votes		179,247			179,775		
Turnout		183,416	79.8	▼1.3			
SPD hold	Majority	12,791	7.1				
