= Hergershausen =

Municipality of Babenhausen, Germany

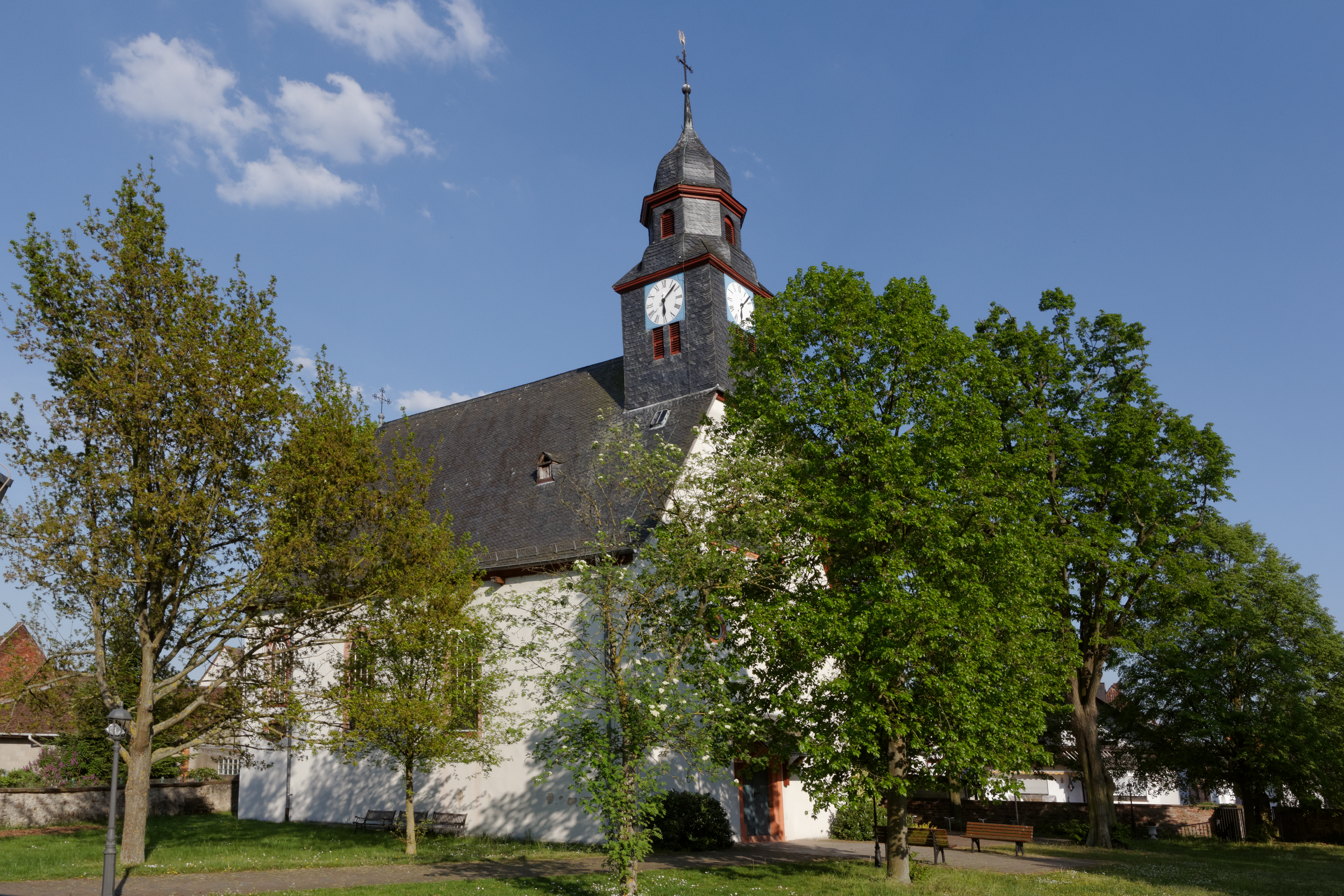
Protestant Church of Hergershausen

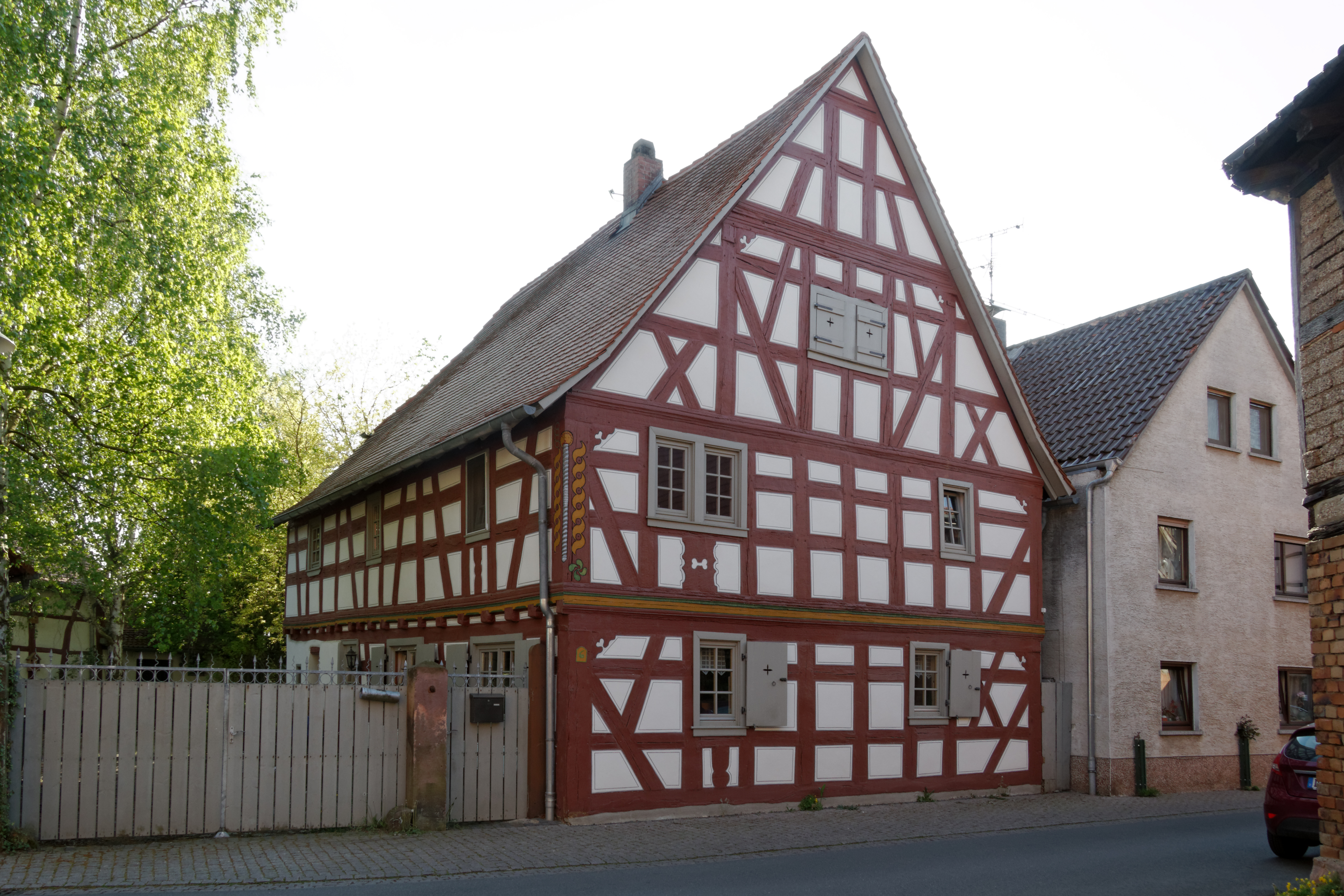
Timbered House in the "Rodgau Straße" street

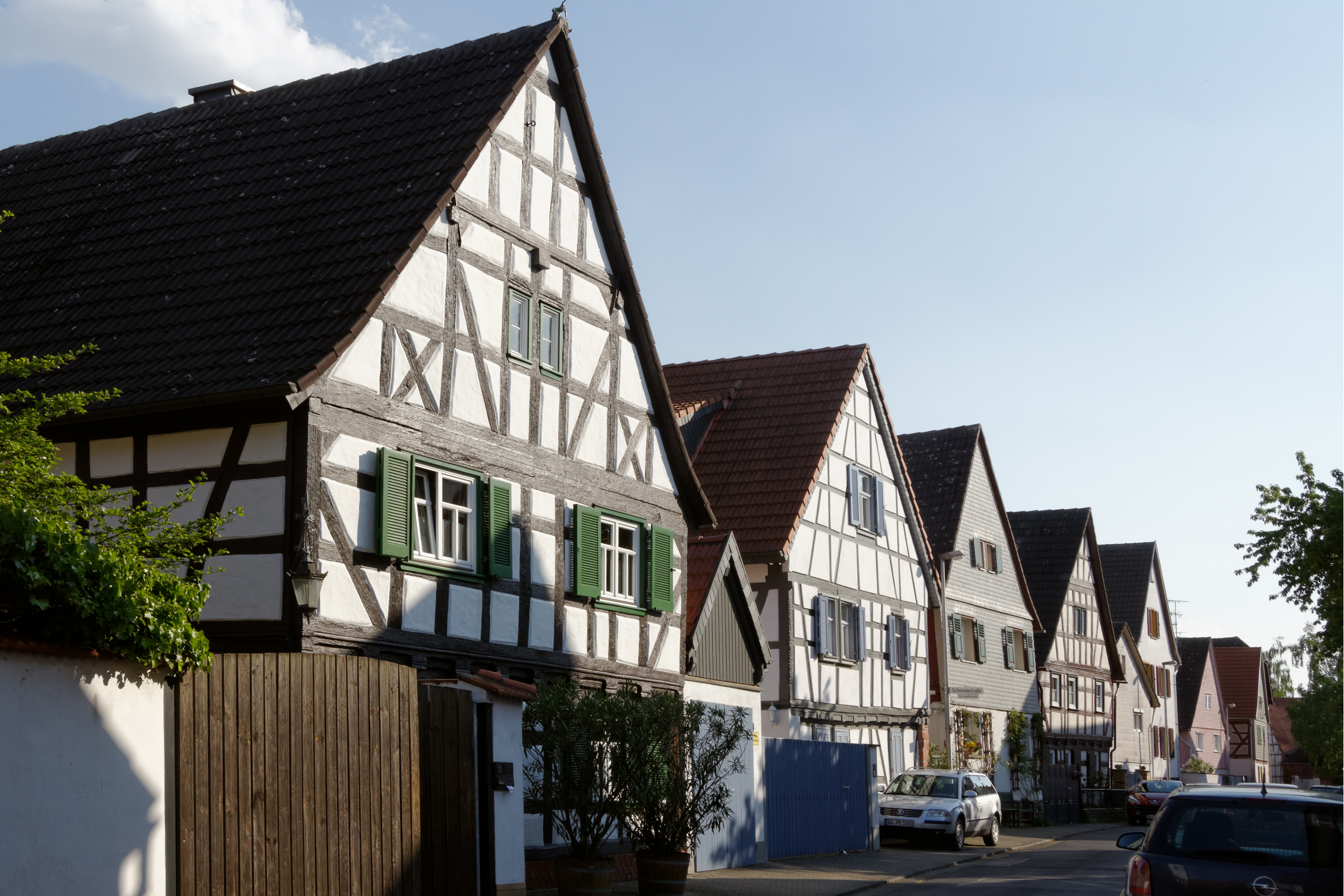
Timbered houses in the "Breite Straße" street in the old Part of Hergershausen

Hergershausen is the largest of the five villages in the municipality of Babenhausen in the district of Darmstadt-Dieburg in southern Hesse.

== Geographical location ==
The town is located in the district of Darmstadt-Dieburg on the first foothills of the northern Odenwald, about 7 km northeast of Dieburg, on the Gersprenz, at an altitude of 130 m. The structure of the village with mostly gabled half-timbered houses from the 17th and 18th centuries is well preserved.

== History ==
=== Prehistory and early history ===
==== Bronze age ====
Apart from bone finds, the first settlement of Hergershausen in the Bronze Age can be proven by a burial mound on the Haugsahl field, west of Hergershausen. The first finds of objects come from the time of the Urnfield culture (1200–800 BC). The Urnfield culture is characterized by the fact that the dead are not buried in burial mounds but burned in urns. The following ceramic objects were found in cremation graves:

- 5 kinked bowls,
- a cone neck mug,
- a shoulder mug,
- a broken cylinder neck,
- a 40.5 cm cylinder neck urn

A ring and two long bone fragments from the La Tène period were found near the water works in Hergershausen. Some of these items are on display in the Schloss Fechenbach Museum in Dieburg.

==== Roman period ====
In Roman times, a Roman road ran through the district of Hergershausen, connecting the Roman fort in Dieburg with Seligenstadt. Finds were made in Roman urn graves on the roads towards Eppertshausen and Sickenhofen, as well as north of Hergershausen. The most important find, however, was the Hergershausen Priapus. A 25 cm tall terracotta statue standing on a pedestal, dressed in a tunic and holding a basket filled with fruit.

=== Middle Ages ===
==== First mention ====
Hergershausen was first mentioned in 1260 as a result of an exchange of interest income. Abbot Rudolf from the monastery of St. Alban near Mainz exchanged the interest income of 2 shillings from Heregerishusen and Großostheim with the equivalent income of the "Jew Anselm with the beard of Mainz", which was closer to Mainz. The exchange was handled by the St. Peter and Alexander Abbey in Aschaffenburg. The document is authenticated with the seal of Abbot Rudolf. Mentions of this exchange can also be found in the necrology of the monastery (1267/68) and in the chamber interest register (1283).

==== Hergershausen's name ====
The name Hergershausen probably derives from a house or other settlement site of a man named Herigar. According to the name, it is probably a Carolingian foundation (687–814 AD). In the period that followed, the place was mentioned in historical documents with changing place names (in brackets the year of the mention).

- Heregerishusin (1260);
- Hergerishusin (1283);
- Hergershusin (1340);
- Hergirshusen (1355);
- Hergetshausen (1369);
- Hergershusen (1371);
- Hergirshusen (1388);
- Hirginshusen (1405);
- Herngeßhusen (1435);
- Hirgerßhußen (1467);
- Hergerßhausen (1545).

==== Medieval History ====
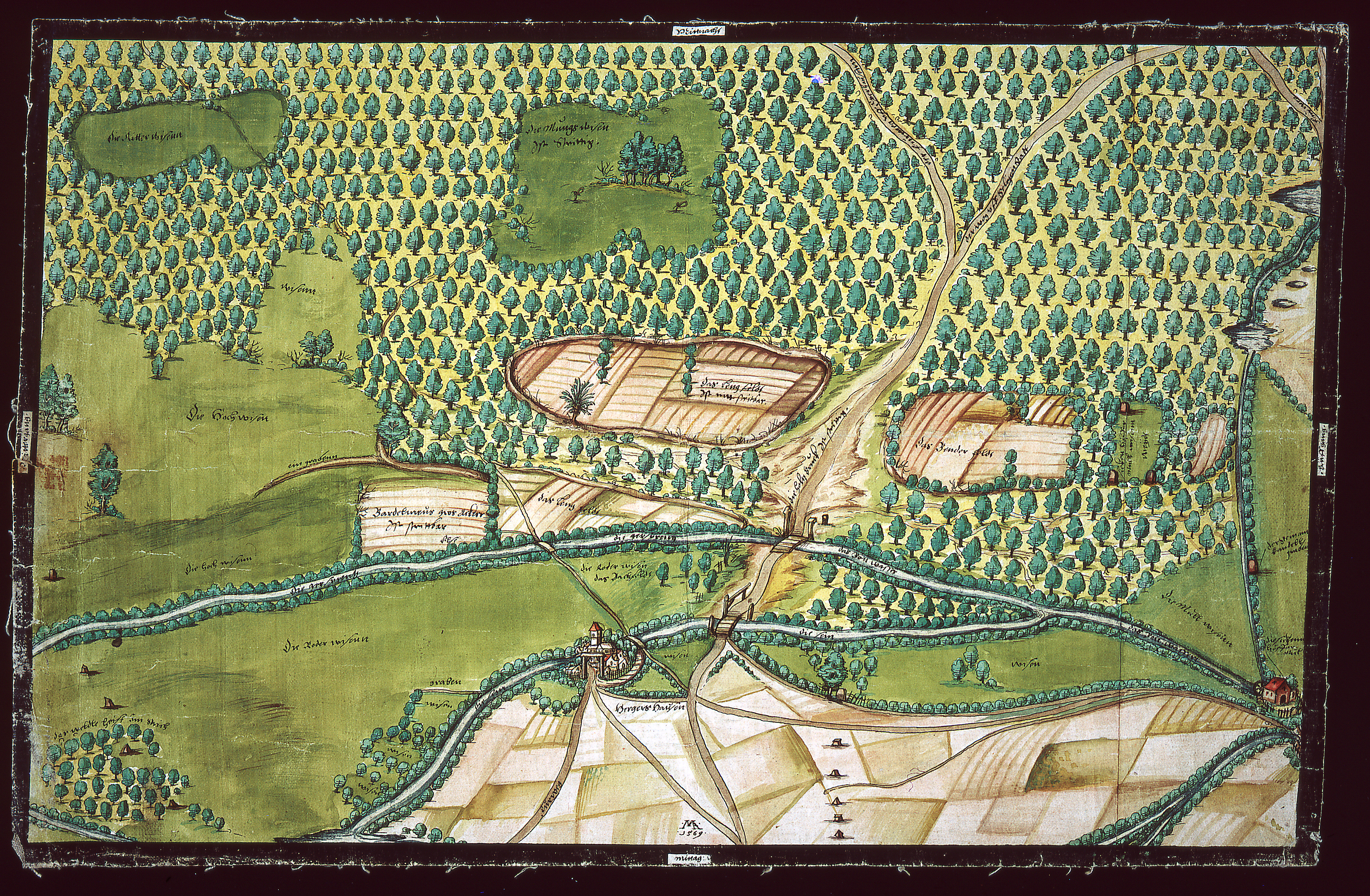
Medieval map of Hergershausen

The village probably came into Hanau possession through the marriage of Adelheid of Münzenberg, daughter of Ulrich I of Münzenberg, to Reinhard I of Hanau, which took place before 1245 (the exact year is not known). It belonged to the Babenhausen office of the Lordship and later County of Hanau, then from 1456 to the County of Hanau-Lichtenberg. It also belonged to the Mark of Babenhausen.

Map of the Mark Babenhausen and surrounding areas

One of the oldest surviving mentions of the village dates back to 1340, when Culmann and Hille Hartrad received a penny of one pound Heller of Hergershausen from Oswald, Johann and Hermann of Groschlag. Before discovering the new first mention in 1260, that mention was the first mention of Hergershausen. Even then, the place was probably given as a fief from the Count of Hanau to the of Groschlag family of Dieburg.

In 1368 the family of Groschlag exchanged rights with the Counts of Hanau. So they received the village court and the right to lodge.

1426 is the first document in which Count Reinhart II of Hanau hands over Hergershausen as a fief to the brothers Heinrich and Henne of Groschlag, with all its accessories (court, fields, meadows, pastures and subjects).

In 1438 the of Groschlag family pledged the fief of Hergershausen with all its accessories and other surrounding places to Count Johann III. and Philip I. of Katzenelnbogen. The Landgraviate of Hesse(-Darmstadt) were the heirs of the Counts of Katzenelnbogen.

The following years are always characterized by legal disputes between the Counts of Hanau-Lichtenberg and the Groschlags, who tried to use every opportunity to obtain more rights for their fief. In 1504, Oswald of Groschlag tried to break away from the rule of the Counts of Hanau-Lichtenberg and go under the electorate of Mainz. He wanted to seize the opportunity presented by the death of Philip II and the imperial ban on his son Philip III. revealed. The project remained after the reconciliation of Philip III. with the Emperor Maximilian Iunsuccessfully.

=== Early modern age ===
==== 16th Century ====
From 1510 to 1552 the residents of Hergershausen bought the Burgrecht in Frankfurt, which meant that in case of danger, the residents of Hergershausen and Sickenhofen could seek shelter behind the city walls of Frankfurt. It is unclear exactly why Frankfurt, which is so far away, was chosen. The Burgrecht was withdrawn from the residents of Hergershausen and Sickenhofen after 52 years because they no longer met their obligations, including the maintenance of the fortifications of Frankfurt.

In 1544, Count Philipp IV of Hanau-Lichtenberg officially converted to the Lutheran faith and in the same year commissioned Erasmus Alberus to convert the sub-county of Babenhausen and thus also Hergershausen. Some citizens of Hergershausen then went to the Protestant Church in Sickenhofen, since in Hergershausen there was only a branch church from the Catholic Church of Dieburg. One can therefore speak of a dichotomy of the denominations until about the year 1600.

In 1546, Landgrave Philipp I of Hesse-Darmstadt renounced the liens of Hergershausen and Sickenhofen for 2,500 guilders, so that the of Groschlag family were again full owners of their fiefdom.

In 1547, the catholic Philipp of Groschlag started an attempt to get himself and his fief, including Hergershausen and Sickenhofen, from the protestant count and feudal lord Philip IV of Hanau-Lichtenberg with the help of a charter of freedom bearing the seal of Emperor Charles V solve. In 1551, Emperor Charles V appealed to the Imperial Chamber Court to clarify the matter. The matter was settled in 1554 with a settlement between Philip IV of Hanau-Lichtenberg and Philip of Groschlag, who died in 1564.

==== 17th century ====
During the Thirty Years' War, the of Groschlag family exploited the turmoil of the war to gain more rights. In 1631, Johann Philipp of Groschlag demanded corvee services from the citizens of Hergershausen and Sickenhofen, who, however, collectively refused. A common citizen of Hergershausen Michael Kratz was regarded as the ringleader and was held in custody at the Court of the Groschlag family in Dieburg for 10 days. However, a Hanau-Lichtenberg official made it absolutely clear that this action had taken place without the count's consent and is therefore not legal.

From August to October 1631, files show that the villages of Hergershausen and Sickenhofen provided 10 imperial horsemen and the imperial troops of Lieutenant Colonel von Meuen and Colonel Ennet with food and housed them.

In 1632 the troops of Count of Isenburg, who was allied with the Swedes, expelled the imperial troops from the Mark of Babenhausen.

1635 began the hardest time for the citizens of Hergershausen. In mid-February, a company of Swedes with 60 horsemen billeted in Babenhausen. On February 25, 1635, the city was besieged by Count Philipp of Mansfeld. The siege was unsuccessful. A last assault took place on March 28, 1635, but this was repulsed by the Swedes. Count Philipp von Mansfeld then withdrew with losses of 350 men, but before he had the Konfurt mill set on fire, which resulted in famine in the city. The siege of Babenhausen is significant for Hergershausen, as many citizens from the surrounding villages sought protection behind the city walls in Babenhausen. A list from the Babenhausen office is available from September 1635, in which 18 surviving citizens of Hergershausen are named.

From 1636 the entire office of Babenhausen, including Hergershausen, was under the Electorate of Mainz. The elector and at the same time archbishop of Mainz attempted to permanently include the office of Babenhausen in his dominions and thereby create a land connection between the electoral possession of Dieburg and the electoral second residence Aschaffenburg. After long negotiations, however, the soldiers of Mainz left Babenhausen again in 1647 and Babenhausen once again belonged to the County of Hanau-Lichtenberg.

In 1647 a French regiment passed through Hergershausen and stole the last bell of the Hergershausen church that was hanging over the chancel.

After the end of the Thirty Years' War in 1648, large parts of the Mark Babenhausen had been devastated and had to be rebuilt. There was a lack of cash, food and livestock. The region recovered only slowly. It was only after the first half of the 18th century that the fortunes and population were likely to have matched those before the war. Due to Count Friedrich Casimir von Hanau-Lichtenberg, Babenhausen lost its status as a residence of the Count, which further promoted the slower development of the region.

In 1688, a contract between Philipp Reinhard of Hanau- Münzenberg and Johann Philipp Ernst Baron of Groschlag made it clear that Groschlag's rights only extended to the southern side of the Gersprenz.

In 1698, with reference to the 1688 treaty, the Gersprenz was defined as the northern border between the Babenhausen district and the Groschlag fiefdom of Hergershausen and Sickenhofen.

=== Modern times ===
==== 18th century ====
In 1706, Russian troops passed through Hergershausen, driven out of Saxony by Swedes.

In 1709, Johann Philipp Ernst Baron of Groschlag signed a contract with the residents of Hergershausen and Sickenhofen regarding the annual taxes to be paid and the compulsory services to be performed. This contract made it clear that the Groschlag family no longer saw themselves exclusively as feudal tenants, but almost as owners of the villages, since they had the right to levy taxes, a fundamental right of the state, which the Counts of Hanau- Münzenberg would actually be entitled to. In 1772, Friedrich Karl Baron of Groschlag self-confidently called himself Lord of Hergershausen.

In 1711/12 the new building of the evangelical church, which is still used today, was consecrated.

After the death of the last Hanau count, Johann Reinhard III. in 1736, Landgrave Friedrich I of Hesse-Kassel inherited the county of Hanau- Münzenberg based on an inheritance contract from 1643. Due to the intestate succession, the county of Hanau-Lichtenberg fell to the son of Johann Reinhard III's only daughter, Landgrave Ludwig IX. of Hesse-Darmstadt. The affiliation of the Babenhausen district and its villages to Hanau-Münzenberg or Hanau-Lichtenberg was disputed between the two heirs, which led to decades of inheritance disputes between the Landgrave of Hesse-Darmstadt and the Landgrave of Hesse-Kassel.

During the War of the Austrian Succession from 1740 to 1748, the area of Hergershausen was repeatedly traversed by Austrian and French troops. These had to be supplied with food, sometimes manual and harness work was also required.

During the Seven Years' War from 1756 to 1763, French troops also had to be provided with food by the inhabitants of the villages.

In 1771, the landgraves of Hesse-Kassel and Hesse-Darmstadt agreed on the so-called partification recess, the Celler settlement. In this comparison, it was determined that the two villages were under the joint administration and should take turns paying taxes to the sovereign each year. The Groschlag kept the fiefdom until the so called Aperturfall – the extinction of the Groschlag male line.

In 1799 Friedrich Carl Willibald the last male of Groschlag died. The inheritance, including the land holdings in Hergershausen and Sickenhofen, went to his sister Philippine Gabriele Sophie of Groschlag. However, the Hessian landgraves of Hesse-Kassel and Hesse-Darmstadt did not give the fiefdom of Hergershausen and Sickenhofen to Philippine Gabriele Sophie of Groschlag and her heirs, as they were angered that the of Groschlag considered Hergershausen and Sickenhofen de facto their property.

==== 19th century ====
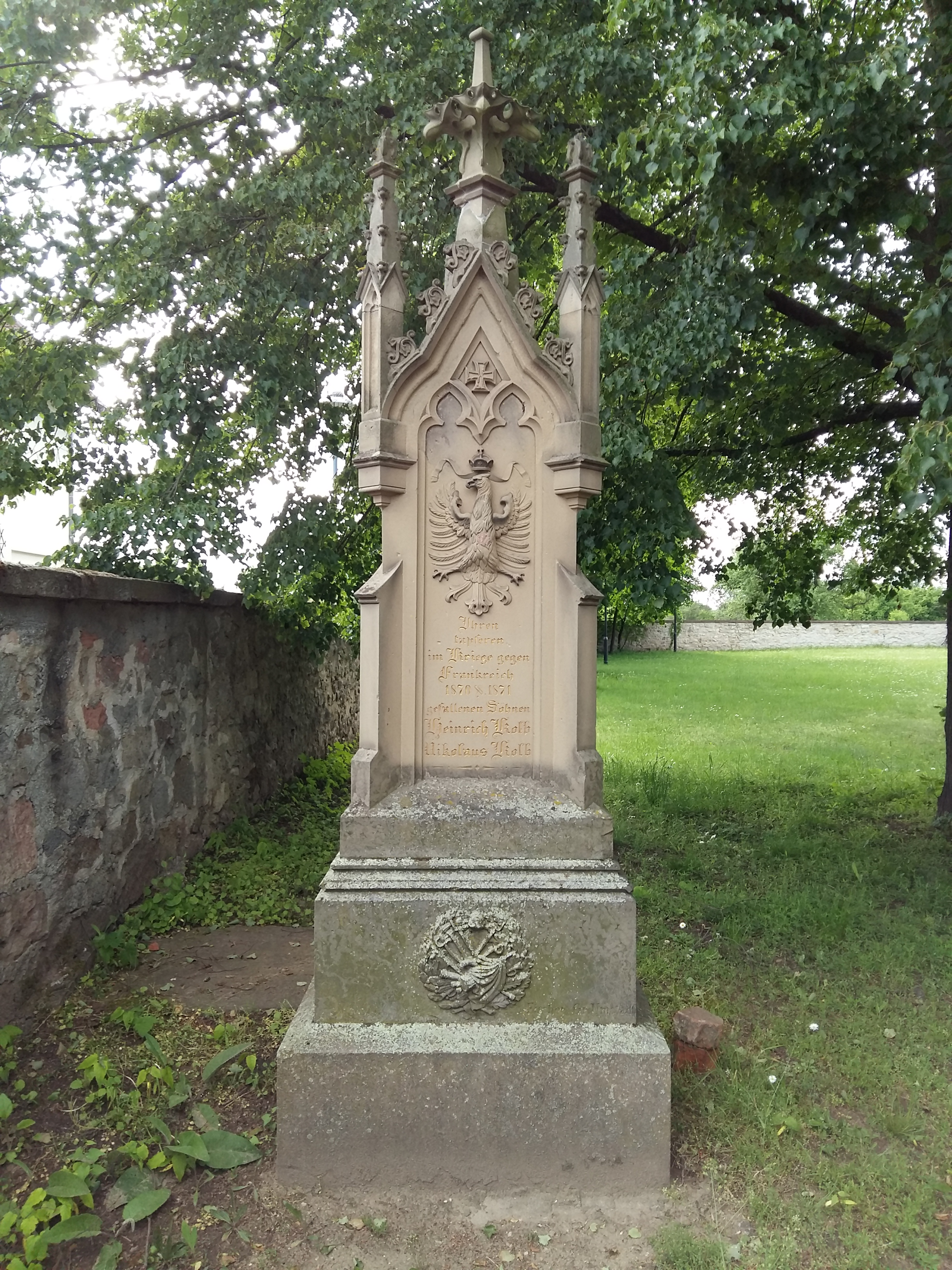
Memorial for the participants of the Franco-Prussian War in the courtyard of the protestant Church of Hergershausen

On March 8, 1800, Hesse-Kassel soldiers moved into Sickenhofen and Hesse-Darmstadt soldiers into Hergershausen to assert their sovereign rights.

On December 31, 1802, an agreement was reached on the amount of compensation for the permanent renunciation of the fiefdom of Hergershausen and Sickenhofen.

On August 26, 1803, Hergershausen was ceremonially handed over to Hesse-Kassel, because the complete feudal rights over Hergershausen were awarded to Hessen-Kassel.

In 1805, as a result of the Second Coalition War, a squadron of French chasseurs with 66 men and 68 horses was billeted in Hergershausen. A regiment of hussars followed later.

In 1806 the office of Babenhausen and with it Hergershausen was occupied by the French because Elector Wilhelm I of Hesse-Kassel refused to join the Confederation of the Rhine.

In 1810, the newly created Grand Duchy of Hesse (Darmstadt) under Grand Duke Ludwig I concluded a state treaty with France, in which the Babenhausen district and thus also Hergershausen were incorporated into the Grand Duchy. This was confirmed after Napoleon's final defeat.

In 1812, during Napoleon's Russian campaign, citizens of Hergershausen also went to war as an ally of France in the Grand Ducal Hessian army. In October for example the citizen Johann Conrad Ackermann from Hergershausen died in Vyazma during the march on Moscow.

In 1813 the Grand Duchy of Hesse left the Confederation of the Rhine. At that time it was a transit area for various troops. For example, in October 1813, Russian soldiers were billeted in Hergershausen and Sickenhofen.

In 1866, citizens of Hergershausen fought on the Austrian side in the Austro-Prussian War. At the same time, Hessian troops were billeted in Hergershausen. After the battle of Laufach/Fronhofen, which Prussia won, the district of Dieburg and thus also Hergershausen was occupied by Prussian troops.

In 1870/71 many citizens of Hergershausen fought in the Franco-Prussian War. There is still a memorial in the courtyard of the Hergershausen Evangelical Church for those who took part and died in the war.

From 1872 until the end of the German Empire on September 2 the Sedan Day was celebrated. The day started with drumming. In the evening the sedan fire was lit on the Sandberg and the day ended with beer and pretzels.

==== 20th century ====
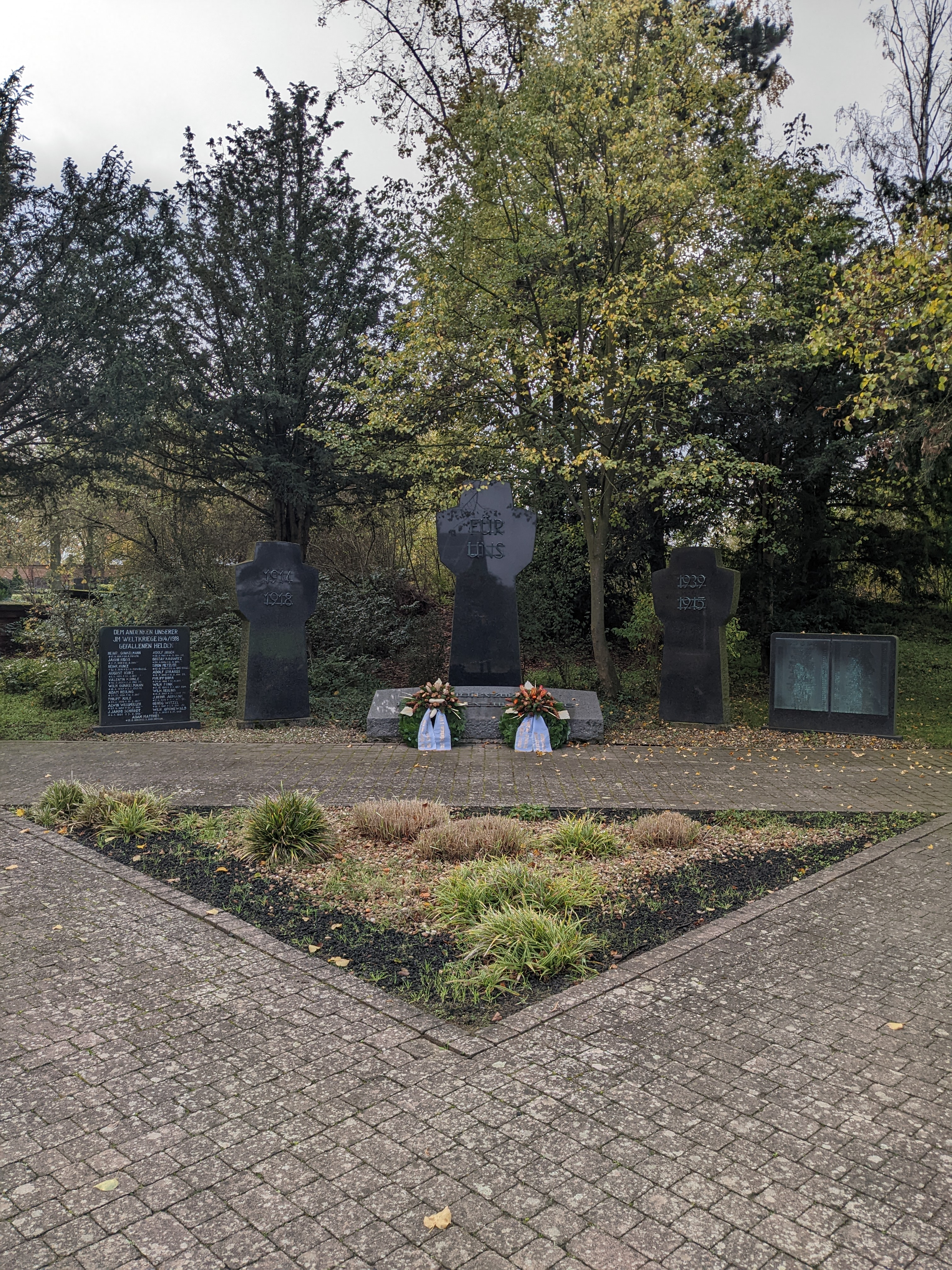
Memorial to the dead of both world wars behind the cemetery

In 1914 World War I. began. Approximately 100 Hergershausen took part in the fighting. In 1918, at the end of the war, Hergershausen had to mourn 21 casualties, including a member of the Jewish community. A memorial to the fallen still stands behind the cemetery on Am Flurgraben street. As a result of the war, the last Grand Duke of Hesse, Ernst Ludwig, was also deposed.

==== Administrative affiliation ====
Until 1821, the Babenhausen office was responsible for administration and jurisdiction in Hergershausen. With the administrative reform in the Grand Duchy of Hesse (-Darmstadt) this year, jurisdiction and administration were also separated here at the lower level.

Districts were created for the administration, which transferred first-instance jurisdiction to district courts. The district of Seligenstadt was given responsibility for administration, including for the Babenhausen office, which was dissolved at the same time. From 1821 to 1832, Hergershausen belonged to the district of Seligenstadt, from 1832 to 1848 to the district of Offenbach, from 1848 to 1852 to the government district of Dieburg and from 1852 to 1977 to the district of Dieburg.

On July 1, 1972, the previously independent municipality of Hergershausen was incorporated into Babenhausen on a voluntary basis as part of the regional reform in Hesse. For Hergershausen – as for the core town of Babenhausen and the other parts of the city – a local district with a local advisory board and mayor was set up according to the Hessian municipal code.

From January 1, 1977, the town of Babenhausen belonged to the Darmstadt-Dieburg district, which arose from the merger of the largest part of the Dieburg district with the Darmstadt district as part of the local government reform.

==== Judicial Affiliation ====
The seat of the court was relocated to Seligenstadt on July 1, 1835, and the name was changed to "Seligenstadt District Court". With the Courts Constitution Act of 1877, the organization and designations of the courts were standardized across the empire. The Grand Duchy of Hesse therefore abolished the regional courts on October 1, 1879. They were functionally replaced by district courts.

== Population ==
=== Population structure 2011 ===
According to the 2011 census, 1,968 people lived in Hergershausen on May 9, 2011. Among them were 111 (5.6%) foreigners. According to age, 381 residents were under 18 years old, 834 were between 18 and 49, 420 between 50 and 64 and 333 residents were older. The inhabitants lived in 822 households. Of these, 231 were single households, 249 couples without children and 273 couples with children, as well as 60 single parents and 9 shared apartments. Only seniors lived in 141 households and no seniors lived in 582 households.

== Religion ==
In Hergershausen there was a branch church of the church of Dieburg, later of the Marienkirche in Münster. The church patronage and thus also the right to tithes lay with the archbishopric of Mainz until 1360, and then with the Mainz cathedral chapter. Ecclesiastical middle authority was the archdeaconate of St. Peter and Alexander in Aschaffenburg, chapter Montat. With the Reformation, the village became Evangelical-Lutheran. From 1711 Hergershausen's evangelical church was built in the Baroque style and inaugurated in 1712. Today the church belongs to the entire parish of Hergershausen-Sickenhofen in the deanery of the Vorderer Odenwald in the priory of Starkenburg of the Protestant Church in Hesse and Nassau.

=== Jewish community in Hergershausen ===
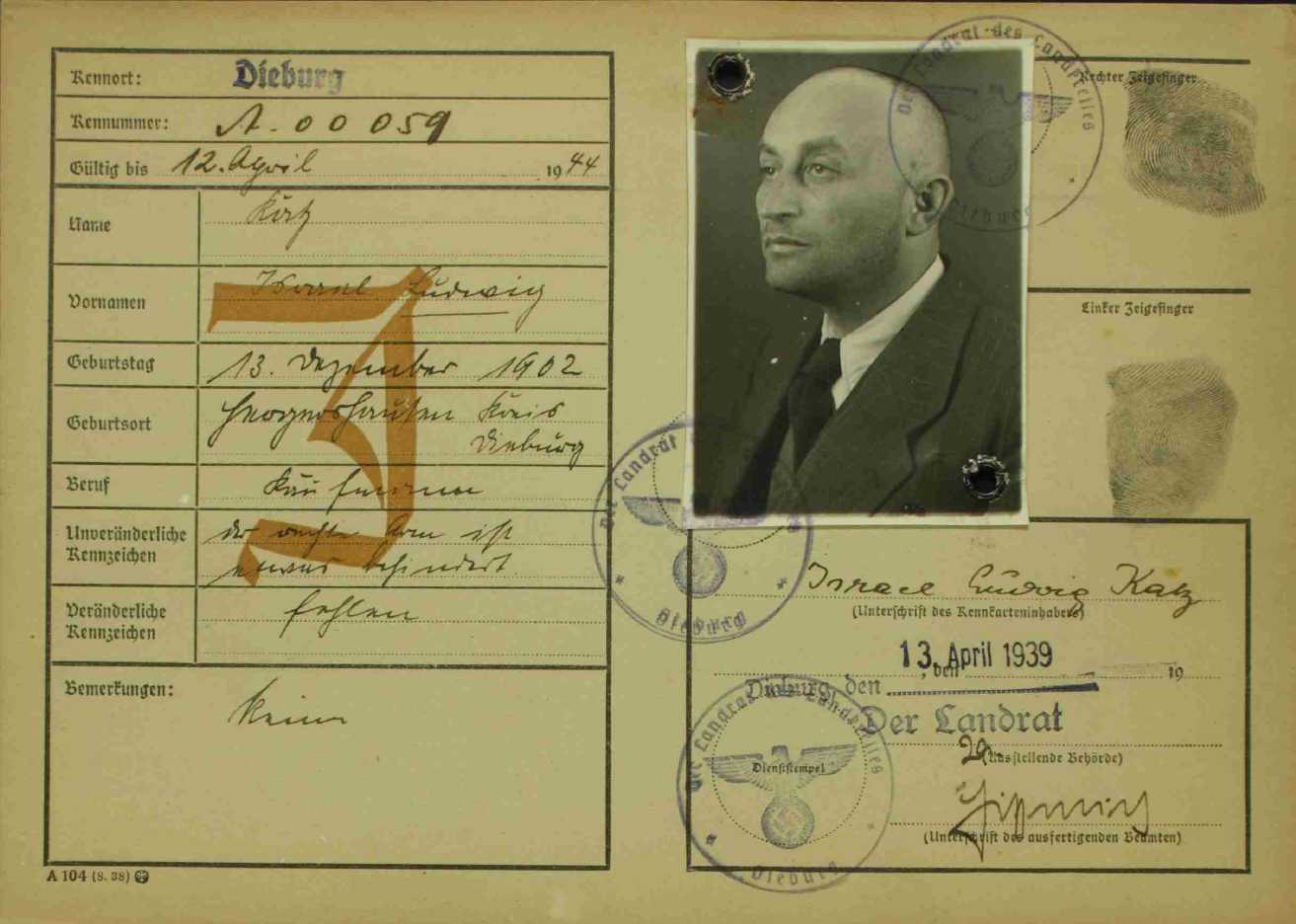
Identification card of the Hergershausen Jew Ludwig Katz, who was murdered in Auschwitz on September 14th, 1943

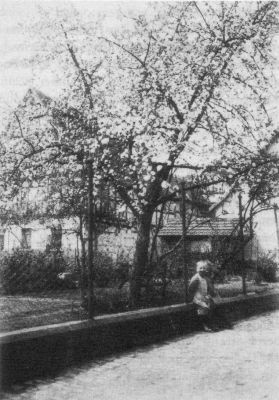
The synagogue of Hergershausen

The first Jewish families settled in Hergershausen at the beginning of the 17th century. Their number grew steadily until, in the 1830s, the highest number of Jews lived in Hergershausen with around 122 people, which corresponded to around one fifth of the total population. However, the number of Jews had already been declining again by the end of the 19th century. The Hergershausen Jewish community built a synagogue, which was inaugurated in September 1869 and used from then until it was burned down in 1938 by members of the SA from Starkenburg during the Kristallnacht pogrom. Deceased Jews were not buried in the Hergershausen Cemetery, but in the Jewish Cemetery in Sickenhofen. A religion teacher was employed in the community, who took care of both religious tasks and administration. The congregation was part of the orthodox district rabbinate in Darmstadt. The Jewish citizens of Hergershausen were mainly active as horse and cattle dealers, butchers or in poultry farming. They were well integrated into village life around the turn of the century and, with few exceptions, good relations are said to have existed between Christians and Jews.

This is how the Hergershausen Jewess Herta Stern remembers:

"Congregational life in Hergershausen was harmonious, as was the relationship with the local Christians. We were devout but not orthodox, were conscious Jews and lived among ourselves. Christians also wished all the best for the New Year, they loved to buy matzah for Passover, and people congratulated or condoled one another at weddings and funerals."

In the 1930s, numerous Jews left Hergershausen. Many emigrated to the USA or moved to big cities like Frankfurt am Main. According to records from the Yad Vashem memorial in Jerusalem, 21 Hergershausen Jews fell victim to the Shoah. Today, a commemorative plaque in Hergershausen, which was dedicated in 2006 on the 50th anniversary of the November pogrom at the site of the synagogue, commemorates the synagogue and the Jewish community of Hergershausen.

=== Historical religious affiliation ===
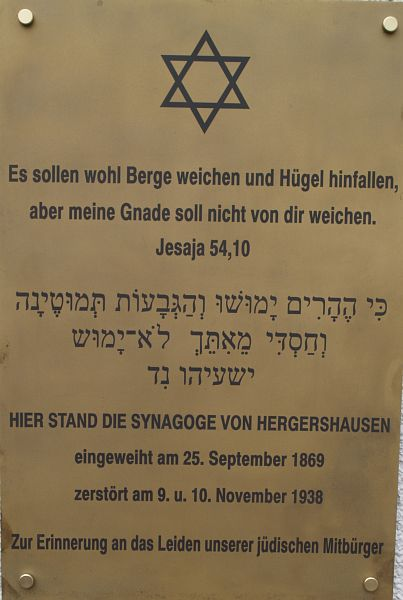
- Memorial plaque on the site of the former Hergershausen synagogue
  1829: 510 Protestant (= 79.07%), 122 Jewish (= 18.91%) and 13 Catholic (= 2.02%) inhabitants
- 1961: 827 Protestant (= 73.91%), 279 Catholic (= 24.93%) inhabitants

== Politics ==
For Hergershausen there is a local district (areas of the former municipality of Hergershausen) with a local council and mayor according to the Hessian municipal code. Since the local elections on March 14, 2021, the local advisory board has included two members of the SPD, four members of the CDU and one member of Alliance 90/The Greens. Mayor is Tanja Buia (CDU).

== Culture and sights ==
=== Regular events ===
- June/July: Serenade concert by the TV Hergershausen orchestra in the Langfeldsmühle
- August: Pond festival of the Hergershausen fishing club
- October: Volksfest Hergershäuser Kerb
- November/December (1st weekend in Advent): Christmas market of the volunteer fire brigade on the Dalles
- 1st–24th December: Living Advent Calendar
- December: Festival of Lights from Herigar e.V.
- December (4th Sunday in Advent): Christmas concert by the orchestra of TV Hergershausen

== Clubs in Hergershausen ==
Hergershausen has a lively club life and well-developed sports facilities. The following clubs are represented in Hergershausen:

- Turnverein 1896 Hergershausen ((children's) gymnastics, making music in the orchestra (and instrumental lessons), tennis, Nordic walking, dancing, rope skipping, volleyball, step aerobics, Pilates)
- Sports club Kickers 1913 Hergershausen (football)
- Fishing Club 1960 Hergershausen
- Herigar e. V. (home club)
- Liederkranz 1891 e. V. Hergershausen (choir)
- Shooting club 1957 Hergershausen (shooting sport)
- Club of dog friends Hergershausen (dog training and education)

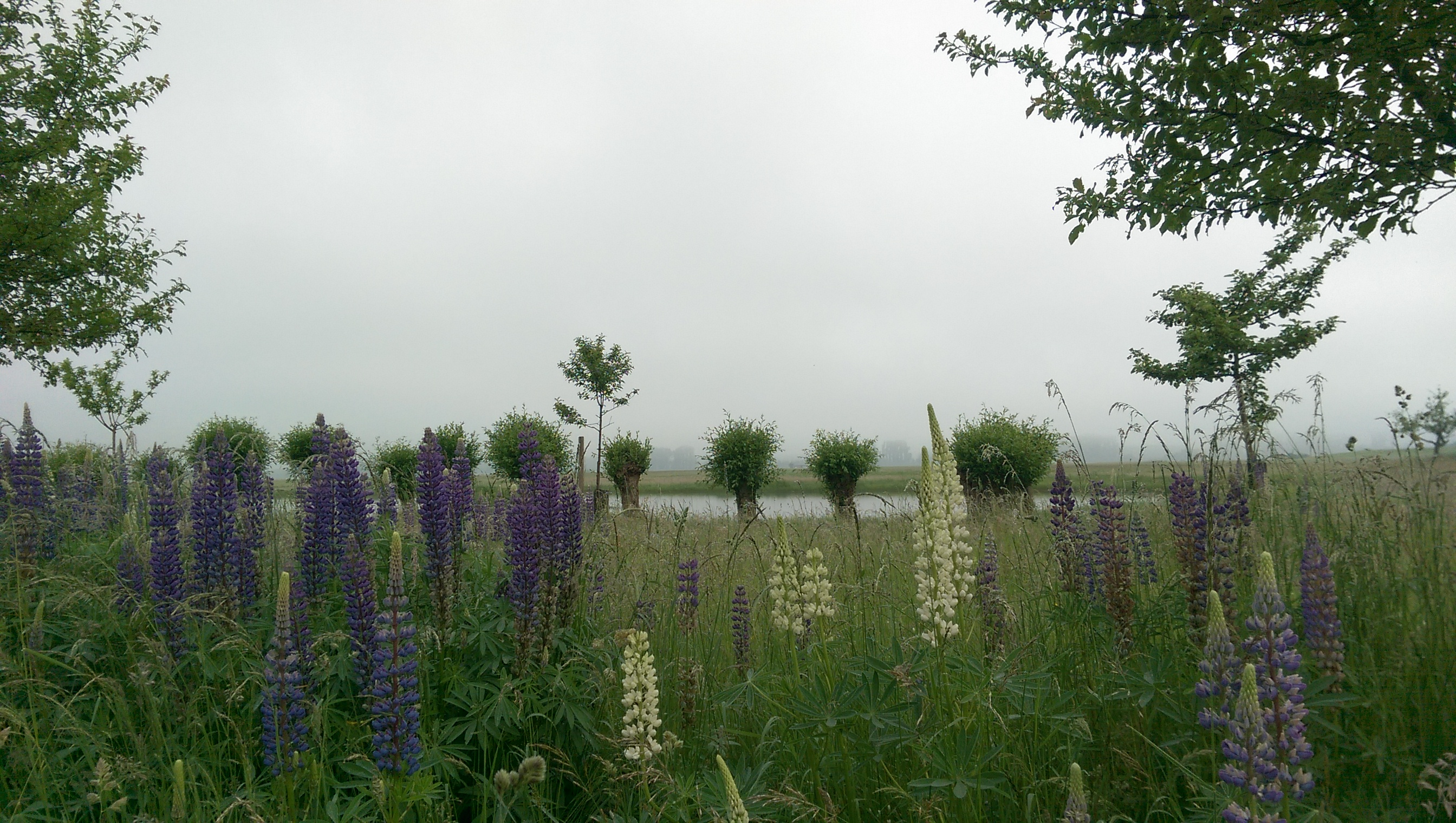
Nature reserve "Auf dem Sand" in Hergershausen

== Nature reserves ==
In addition to Münster, Altheim and Eppertshausen, Hergershausen has a large part of the approximately 400-hectare floodplain area "Hergershäuser Wiesen" on the lower reaches of the Gersprenz.river The renaturation of the Gersprenz, the conversion of arable land back to grassland, the rewetting of parts of the area and the creation of ponds and hollows since 1980 have created, among other things, wet meadows and fen meadows, which bring a high level of biodiversity to the floodplain landscape of the Hergershäuser Wiesen every year. The Hergershäuser Wiesen have become an ideal breeding, resting and feeding place for many bird species.

Here are the nature reserve "Die kleine Qualle Hergershausen", which has existed since 1984, and the nature Reserve "Auf dem Sand" between Hergershausen and Altheim", which was designated in 1998. North of Hergershausen is the nature reserve "Brackenbruch bei Hergershausen" with wet meadows, water bodies and near-natural forest stands. These three protected areas are embedded in the larger Natura2000 areas "Untere Gersprenz" (FFH area 6019-303) and "Untere Gersprenzaue" (EU bird protection area 6119-401), sub-area Hergershausen.

The Hergershäuser Wiesen offer a varied habitat for around 160 plant species, some of which are highly specialized, around 30 dragonfly species and 40 butterfly species. Swarms of cranes, geese and lapwings rest here with up to 1000 animals. Rare birds such as little egrets from the south, curlews or phalaropes from the north use the wet meadows as a resting place. Black and red kites, as well as the tree falcon can be found in the surrounding forests. The meadows are breeding grounds for rare animals such as snipes, little grebes, corn buntings and stonechats. After 30 years of abstinence, the white stork has been breeding again since 2000. There were also 5 avocets, 2 black-necked grebes, a common raven breeding pair and 11 rook breeding pairs observed. Especially in spring, the European tree frog and natterjack toad cannot be ignored. Swallowtails and various blue ants can be observed as rare moths. Snake knotweed, primroses and the garlic Germander are growing again in the meadows. And for a few years now, the beaver has migrated back into the Gersprenz floodplain in the area of the nature reserve. The area itself can be explored using well-developed hiking and biking trails as well as viewing platforms.

== Townscape ==
The evangelical church characterizes the townscape. More than 20 half-timbered and farmhouses in the old part of Hergershausen are listed as cultural monuments under the Hessian Monument Protection Act. In 2005, the town won a medal in the competition "Unser Dorf hat Zukunft".

== Economy and Infrastructure ==
Hergershausen has a station on the Rhine-Main-Railway in the section between Darmstadt Hauptbahnhof and Aschaffenburg Hauptbahnhof.

Hergershausen is also connected to Babenhausen and some other villages of the municipality of Babenhausen like Sickenhofen, Harpertshausen and Langstadt, as well as to Schaafheim through its three stops on the BA1 bus line.

The federal highway 26 runs about 500 m from the village and is connected via a road.

The Zweckverband Gruppewasserwerk Dieburg has its headquarters in the Hergershausen waterworks.

== Literature ==
- Tilo Fink: Eintritt in die Geschichte der Dörfer Sickenhofen und Hergershausen (2015)
- Barbara Demandt: Die mittelalterliche Kirchenorganisation in Hessen südlich des Mains = Schriften des Hessischen Landesamtes für geschichtliche Landeskunde 29 (1966), S. 119.
- Max Herchenröder: Die Kunstdenkmäler des Landkreises Dieburg. 1940, S. 158.
- Wilhelm Müller: Hessisches Ortsnamenbuch. Band 1: Starkenburg. 1937, S. 315ff.
- Hans Georg Ruppel (Bearb.): Historisches Ortsverzeichnis für das Gebiet des ehem. Großherzogtums und Volksstaats Hessen mit Nachweis der Kreis- und Gerichtszugehörigkeit von 1820 bis zu den Veränderungen im Zuge der kommunalen Gebietsreform = Darmstädter Archivschriften 2. 1976, S. 113.
- Dagmar Söder: Kulturdenkmäler in Hessen. Kreis Offenbach = Denkmaltopographie Bundesrepublik Deutschland. 1987, S. 777ff.
- Literatur über Hergershausen nach Register nach GND In: Hessische Bibliographie
- Suche nach Hergershausen In: Archivportal-D der Deutschen Digitalen Bibliothek
