= Richard Hammer =

Richard Hammer may refer to:

- Dick Hammer, American athlete, firefighter, and actor
- Richard Hammer (politician), German politician

== See also ==
- Richard Hammar, legal counsel for the Assemblies of God
