= Andreas Storm =

German politician

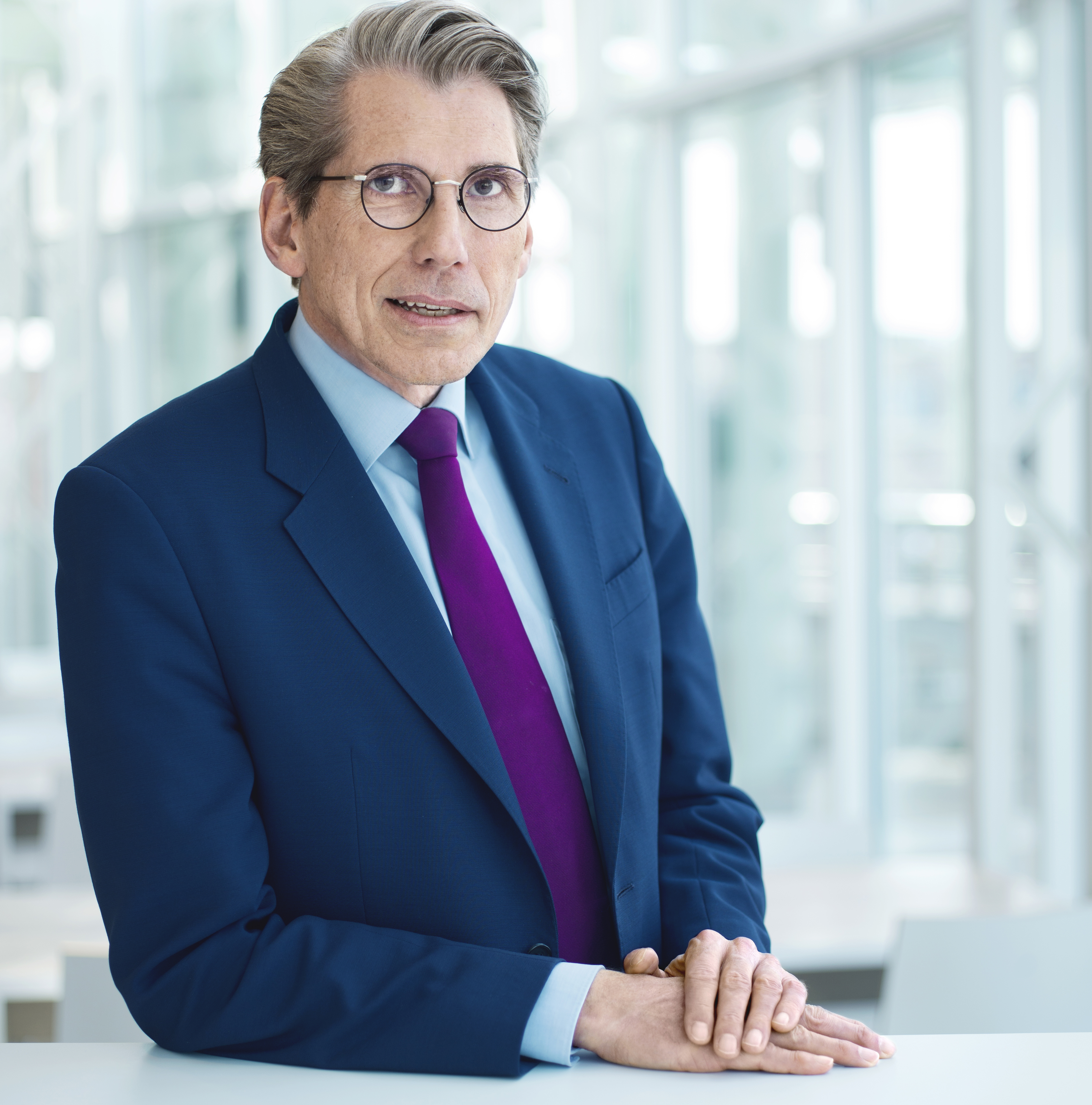
- Storm in 2019

Minister for Social Affairs, Health, Women and Family of Saarland
- In office 9 May 2012 – 12 November 2014
- Minister-President: Annegret Kramp-Karrenbauer
- Preceded by: Monika Bachmann
- Succeeded by: Monika Bachmann

Minister for the Environment, Energy and Transport of Saarland
- In office 18 January 2012 – 9 May 2012
- Minister-President: Annegret Kramp-Karrenbauer
- Preceded by: Simone Peter
- Succeeded by: Anke Rehlinger (Environment); Heiko Maas (Energy and Transport)

Minister for Federal Affairs of Saarland
- In office 10 August 2011 – 9 May 2012
- Minister-President: Annegret Kramp-Karrenbauer
- Preceded by: Karl Rauber
- Succeeded by: Office abolished

Member of the Bundestag; from Hesse
- In office 10 November 1994 – 27 October 2009
- Preceded by: Eike Ebert
- Succeeded by: Multi-member district
- Constituency: Darmstadt (1994–1998); State list (1998–2009)

Personal details
- Born: 20 May 1964 (age 62) Darmstadt, West Germany
- Party: Christian Democratic Union
- Education: Goethe University Frankfurt

Andreas Storm (born 20 May 1964) is a German health insurance manager and former politician (CDU). From 2005 to 2009 he was Parliamentary State Secretary to the Federal Minister of Education and Research. From November 2009 to August 2011 he was a permanent State Secretary in the Federal Ministry of Labor and Social Affairs. From 2011 to 2012 Storm was head of the Saarland State Chancellery and Minister for Federal Affairs, and from 9 May 2012 to 12 November 2014 he was Minister for Social Affairs, Health, Women and Family in Saarland. From 1994 to 2009 Storm was a member of the German Bundestag. Since 1 January 2017 he has been chairman of the Board of DAK-Gesundheit.

== Education and career ==
After graduating from high school in 1983, Storm studied economics at the Johann Wolfgang Goethe University in Frankfurt am Main, graduating in 1988 with a degree in economics. He then worked as a research associate at the Institute for Development, Environment and Quantitative Economic Research. In 1990, he moved to the policy department of the Federal Ministry for Economic Affairs and Energy as a consultant. On 1 July 2016 he joined the board of DAK-Gesundheit and took over as chairman of the board on 1 January 2017. In December 2021, Storm was re-elected by the administrative board of DAK-Gesundheit for another six years. His second term began on 1 July 2022.
