= Astrid Mannes =

German author and politician

Member of the Bundestag
- In office 26 January 2024 – 25 March 2025
- Preceded by: Ingmar Jung
- Succeeded by: Stefan Korbach
- Constituency: Wiesbaden
- In office 24 October 2017 – 26 October 2021
- Preceded by: Brigitte Zypries
- Succeeded by: Andreas Larem
- Constituency: Darmstadt

Personal details
- Born: Astrid Ursula Luise Mannes; 2 January 1967 (age 59) Hilden, West Germany
- Party: Christian Democratic Union

Astrid Mannes (born 2 January 1967) is a German author and politician of the Christian Democratic Union (CDU) who has served as a member of the national parliament ("Bundestag") from 2017 to 2021 and again from 2024 to 2025.

For her first term, Mannes was directly elected as a member for constituency of Darmstadt.

== Early life and education ==
Astrid Luise Mannes was born into a Protestant family in Hilden, a mid-sized industrial town a short distance to the east of Düsseldorf. She grew up in the town, where she attended the Helmholtz-Gymnasium (secondary school), successfully passing her school final exams (Abitur) in 1986. Her degree, for which she studied between 1986 and 1990, embraced history, political sciences and public law. She received her degree in 1991.

== Early career ==
During 1991/92 Mannes worked as a personal assistant to Herbert Czaja who at that time was president (described in at least one source as "the controversial president") of the Federation of Expellees ("Bund der Vertriebenen"), an organisation originally formed in 1957 to represent the interests of ethnic German victims of the ethnic cleansing east of the Oder–Neisse line during 1944-1950. Between 1992 and 2000 she was employed as a research assistant in the then recently relocated Bundestag. During this time she worked both for the CDU/CSU parliamentary group as a whole and for several individual Bundestag members.

Between 2000 and 2007 Mannes held a succession of relatively short-term appointments, while keeping in touch with the world of politics. From 2001 till 2003 she was a press spokeswoman for the German Didacta Association ("Deutschen Didacta Verband"), a lobbying organisation representing businesses involved in education and training. She also found time to work on her doctorate, which she received from the University of Dortmund in 2005. Her dissertation was a biography of Constantin Fehrenbach, a long-forgotten (by many) German chancellor during the early days of German democracy.

== Political career ==
During 1986/87 Mannes served as chair of the Association of Christian Democratic Students faction in the Bonn Student Parliament. She joined the CDU (party) itself in 1990. Within the party she was involved in various committees. Between 2006 and 2008 she served as district chair of the (CDU) Women's Union in Darmstadt-Dieburg, having by this time moved the centre of her operation upriver to the region south of Frankfurt.

In 2007 Mannes put herself forward as a candidate in the mayoral election for Mühltal, a small town in the hills to the south of Darmstadt. On 1 July 2007, two days after the much postponed opening of the Lohberg road tunnel, she was elected, taking office on 28 November 2007. She was a popular mayor. On 9 June 2013, she received the votes of 54.9% of participating voters in the subsequent mayoral election.

On 27 March 2011 the local party moved her up from place 39 to place 10 on the CDU candidate list for the district council election which, given the strength of party support in the area, meant that she became a member of the district council. She became a member of the CDU Party Executive for South Hesse (Darmstadt region).

In the 2017 General Election Mannes stood successfully for election to the national parliament ("Bundestag"). This time, instead of being elected through inclusion on a regional party list, she was elected directly as the winning candidate for the Darmstadt electoral district ("Wahlkreis 186"). Her margin of victory was a narrow one: Darmstadt had previously been represented by Brigitte Zypries (SPD) since 2005. In parliament, she served on the Committee on Education, Research and Technology Assessment.

Mannes lost her seat in the 2021 German federal election but eventually re-entered parliament when she took the seat of Ingmar Jung who had resigned.
