= Messel =

- Municipality
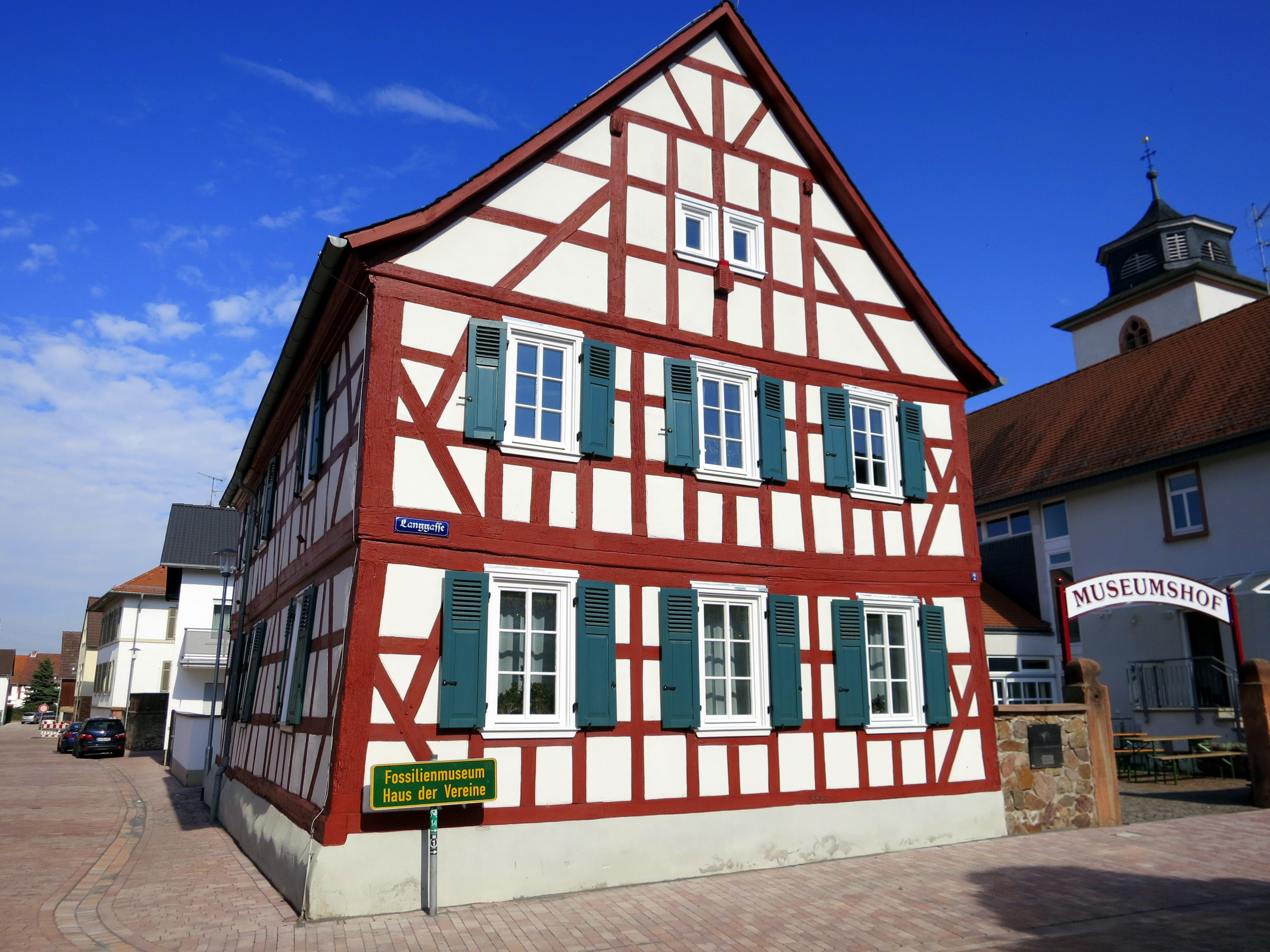
- Museum of Fossils

- Coat of arms

- Location of Messel within Darmstadt-Dieburg district
- Interactive map of Messel
- Location within Germany Location within Hesse
- Coordinates: 49°56′N 08°44′E
- Country: Germany
- State: Hesse
- Admin. region: Darmstadt
- District: Darmstadt-Dieburg

Government
  - Mayor (2022–28): Thorsten Buhrmester

Area
  - Total: 14.82 km^{2} (5.72 sq mi)
- Elevation: 172 m (564 ft)

Population (2025-12-31)
  - Total: 4,229
  - Density: 285.4/km^{2} (739.1/sq mi)
- Time zone: UTC+01:00 (CET)
  - Summer (DST): UTC+02:00 (CEST)
- Postal codes: 64409
- Dialling codes: 06159
- Vehicle registration: DA / DI
- Website: www.messel.de

Messel is a municipality in the district of Darmstadt-Dieburg in Hesse near Frankfurt am Main in Germany.

The village is first mentioned, as Masilla, in the Lorsch codex. Messel was the property of the lords of Groschlag from ca. 1400 to 1799. After the extinction of the Groschlag male lineage, the village would have passed to the Archbishopric of Mainz but the population refused to accept this transition and paid homage to the daughters of the Groschlag family instead. The minister of the archbishopric, von Albini, consequently occupied the village with a force of 50 hussars. In 1806, the village fell to the Grand Duchy of Hesse.

The nearby Messel pit is an important site for Eocene fossils.

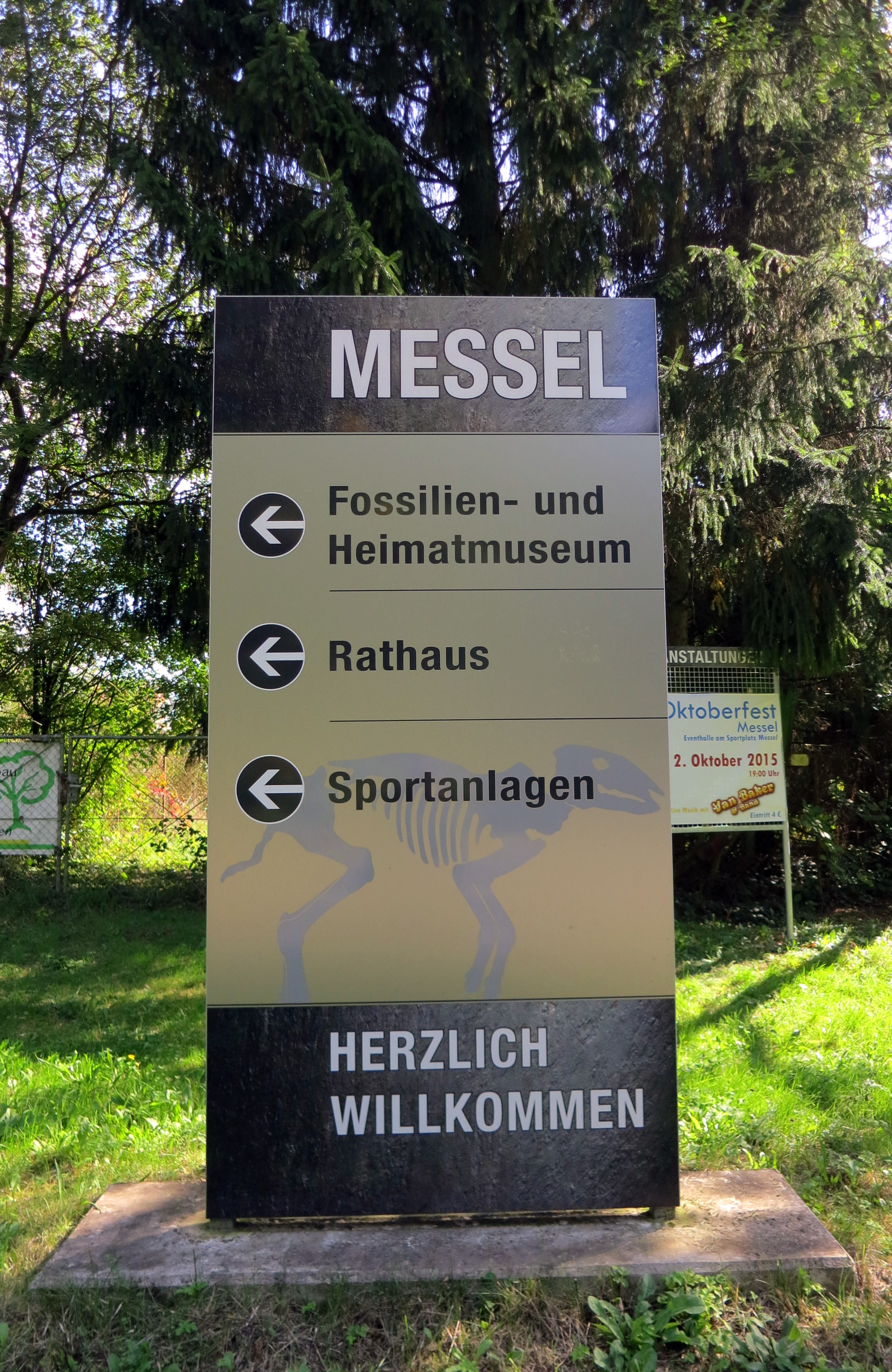
Signpost at the entrance

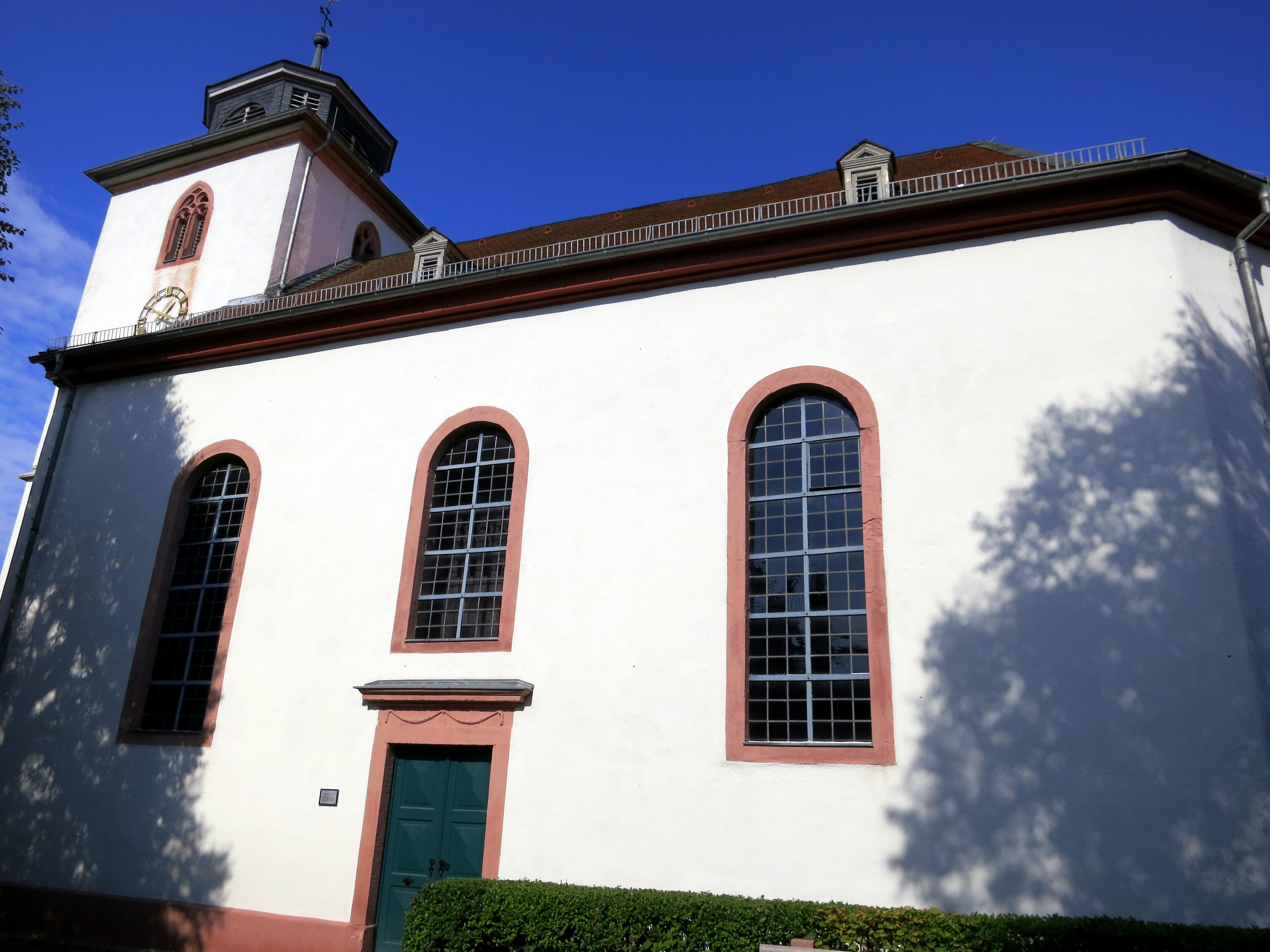
Protestant Church of 1545
