= Andreas Larem =

German politician

- Larem in 2021

Member of the Bundestag; for Darmstadt
- In office 26 October 2021 – 25 March 2025
- Preceded by: Astrid Mannes
- Succeeded by: Seat vacant

Personal details
- Born: 25 September 1964 (age 62) Dieburg, West Germany
- Party: Social Democratic
- Children: 2

Andreas Larem (born 25 September 1964) is a German politician of the Social Democratic Party (SPD) who has been serving as a member of the Bundestag since 2021.

== Political career ==
Larem became a member of the Bundestag in the 2021 elections, representing the Darmstadt district.

In parliament, Larem has since been serving on the Committee on Foreign Affairs and its Subcommittee on the United Nations, International Organizations and Civil Crisis Prevention.

In addition to his committee assignments, Larem is part of the German Parliamentary Friendship Group for Relations with the States of South Asia.

== Other activities ==
- German Poland Institute (DPI), Member of the Board of Trustees (since 2022)
