= Helga Timm =

German politician (1924–2014)

Member of the Bundestag; from Hesse
- In office 20 October 1969 – 20 December 1990
- Preceded by: Multi-member district
- Succeeded by: Eike Ebert
- Constituency: State list (1969–1980); Darmstadt (1980–1990)

Personal details
- Born: Helga Magdalena Timm; 11 July 1924 Hamburg, Germany
- Died: 6 December 2014 (aged 90) Darmstadt, Germany
- Party: Social Democratic
- Education: University of Hamburg

Helga Magdalena Timm (11 July 1924 – 6 December 2014) was a German politician.

== Early life and education ==
Timm studied History, Classics and Education from 1946 to 1952. She earned a doctorate at the University of Hamburg in 1952. Her doctoral thesis, supervised by Fritz Fischer, investigated the grand coalition formed by Hermann Müller, and its ultimate breakdown in 1930. The Commission for Parliamentary History and Political Parties published the dissertation in 1953 as the first study that dealt with the subject.

== Career ==
From 1953 to 1965, Timm worked as a scientific fellow of the UNESCO Youth Institute in Gauting. She then lectured at the Institute of Labour, affiliated with the University of Frankfurt. From 1946 until 1952, Timm was a member of the Social Democratic Party of Germany (SPD) and the Socialist German Student Union. Timm was elected to the Bundestag from a regional list of candidates of the SPD party in Hessen, and served for six terms between 20 October 1969 and 20 December 1990. From 1973 to 1987, she was chief whip of the SPD party, responsible for ensuring that members are present at voting time. In addition, Timm had a seat on the German Society Committee for the United Nations.

She was buried in Darmstadt Forest Cemetery.
