= Brigitte Zypries =

German lawyer and politician

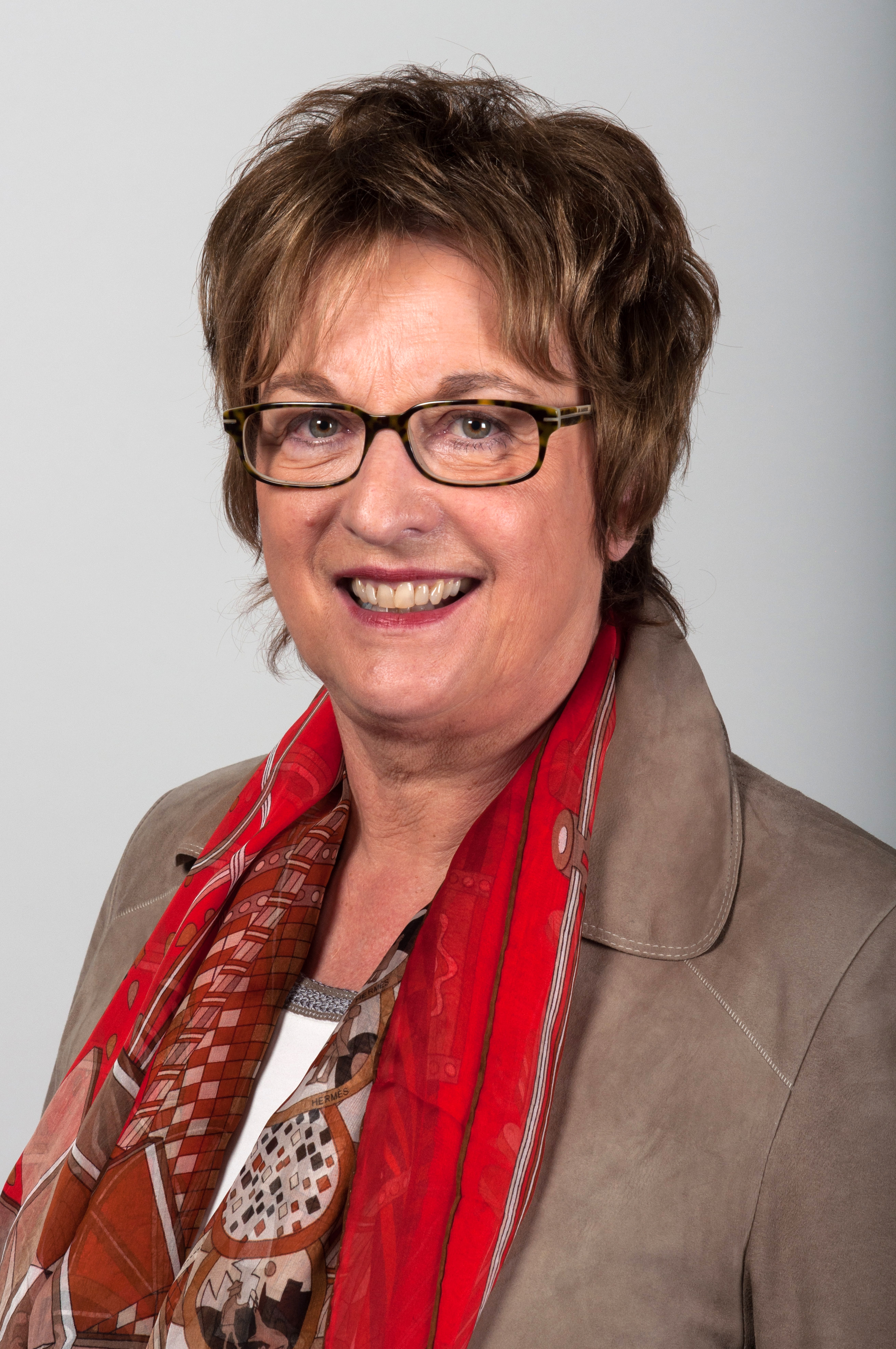
- Zypries in 2014

Minister for Economic Affairs and Energy
- In office 27 January 2017 – 14 March 2018
- Chancellor: Angela Merkel
- Preceded by: Sigmar Gabriel
- Succeeded by: Peter Altmaier

Minister of Justice
- In office 22 October 2002 – 17 October 2009
- Chancellor: Gerhard Schröder; Angela Merkel
- Preceded by: Herta Däubler-Gmelin
- Succeeded by: Sabine Leutheusser-Schnarrenberger

Parliamentary State Secretary for Aerospace Affairs
- In office 17 December 2013 – 26 January 2017
- Minister: Sigmar Gabriel
- Preceded by: Peter Hintze
- Succeeded by: Dirk Wiese

Member of the Bundestag; for Darmstadt
- In office 18 October 2005 – 24 October 2017
- Preceded by: Walter Hoffmann
- Succeeded by: Astrid Mannes

Personal details
- Born: 16 November 1953 (age 73) Kassel, West Germany
- Party: Social Democratic
- Education: University of Giessen
- Website: brigittezypries.de

Brigitte Zypries (born 16 November 1953) is a German lawyer and politician of the Social Democratic Party (SPD). Between 2017 and 2018, she served as Minister for Economics and Energy in the government of Chancellor Angela Merkel; she was the first woman to hold that office in German history.

Zypries had previously been Parliamentary State Secretary since December 2013, charged with the coordination of Germany's aviation and space policies. She was Federal Minister of Justice of Germany from 2002 to 2009 and State Secretary at the Federal Ministry of the Interior from 1998 to 2002.

== Early life and education ==
Zypries studied law at the University of Giessen from 1972 to 1977, and took her first legal state exam in 1978. Then followed in-service training in the regional court district of Gießen, and in 1980 the second state exam. Until 1985 she worked at the University of Giessen.

== Career ==
=== Early career ===
- 1985–1988: Assistant head of division at State Chancellery of Hesse
- 1988–1990: Member of academic staff at the Federal Constitutional Court of Germany
- 1991: Head of division of the State Chancellery of Lower Saxony
- 1995–1997: Head of department of the State Chancellery of Lower Saxony
- to 1998: Active in the Ministry for Women, Labour and Social Affairs of Lower Saxony

=== State Secretary at the Federal Ministry of the Interior (1998–2002) ===
Following the 1998 federal elections, in the first cabinet of Chancellor Gerhard Schröder, Zypries became State Secretary in the Federal Ministry of the Interior under Otto Schily. From September 1999, she chaired the State Secretary Committee for the management of the Federal Government program "Modern State – Modern Administration".

=== Federal Minister of Justice (2002–2009) ===
Following the 2002 federal elections, Zypries became Federal Minister of Justice in the second cabinet of Chancellor Gerhard Schröder, succeeding Herta Däubler-Gmelin. Between 2007 and 2009, she was also one of 32 members of the Second Commission on the modernization of the federal state (Föderalismuskommission II), which had been established to reform the division of powers between federal and state authorities in Germany.

In 2003, Zypries represented the German government before the Federal Constitutional Court when the Free Democratic Party challenged a German law allowing authorities to eavesdrop on conversations in private homes. While law-enforcement officials and the government argue that the law helps fight organized crime and terrorism, opponents contend it violates constitutional privacy guarantees and has not allowed authorities to crack a single major case.

In 2005, the German government suffered a major setback in its efforts to combat terrorism after the Federal Constitutional Court ruled that the country's implementation of the European Arrest Warrant was unconstitutional. The court said the EU idea was compatible with Germany's constitution, but that the law drafted by Zypries was sloppily written and did not go far enough in framing the leeway offered to prosecutors by the European Arrest Warrant. Just hours after the ruling, German police released terrorism suspect Mamoun Darkazanli, who had been held awaiting extradition to Spain where he is believed to have been linked to al-Qaida activities. When German economics minister Karl-Theodor zu Guttenberg decided to outsource the drafting of new bankruptcy legislation in 2009, Zypries criticized that Guttenberg wasted taxpayers' money and that it was the responsibility of her ministry, not his, to oversee the preparation of the legislation. In 2010, the Constitutional Court ruled that a law requiring telecommunications companies to retain data from telephone, email and Internet traffic is unconstitutional; the law had been introduced by Zypries as implementation of an EU guideline.

In the negotiations to form a government following the 2005 federal elections, Zypries led the SPD's delegations in the working groups on justice, consumer protection, and internal affairs; her co-chairs from the CDU/CSU were Wolfgang Bosbach, Horst Seehofer and Wolfgang Schäuble, respectively.

After German prosecutors had issued arrest warrants in 2007 for 13 suspected CIA operatives believed to have been involved in the abduction of Khaled el-Masri in North Macedonia in late 2003 as well as in his being taken via Baghdad to a secret CIA prison in Afghanistan in January 2004, Zypries soon decided not to further pursue the CIA agents. Though their names were still on an Interpol wanted persons list, the United States stated that it would not recognize its validity. Zypries explained that the US government had made clear to her that it would neither arrest nor hand over the agents. In the end, she concluded that, given the slim chances of success, it made no sense to even try to get them extradited.

On the occasion of the sixtieth anniversary of the founding of the State of Israel, Zypries participated in the first joint cabinet meeting of the governments of Germany and Israel in Jerusalem in March 2008.

In the case of Richard Williamson in 2009, Zypries said that the German government was willing to press charges against the bishop if he did not clearly retract his comments.

In 2009, Zypries led the resistance to the Google Books Library Project in Germany. In the daily Stuttgarter Nachrichten, she accused Google of behaving in a "simply unlawful" way.

=== Member of Parliament (2009–2017) ===
Between 2009 and 2013, Zypries served on the German Bundestag's Committee on the Election of Judges (Wahlausschuss), which is in charge of appointing judges to the Federal Constitutional Court of Germany. From 2009, she was also a member of the parliamentary body in charge of appointing judges to the Highest Courts of Justice, namely the Federal Court of Justice (BGH), the Federal Administrative Court (BVerwG), the Federal Fiscal Court (BFH), the Federal Labour Court (BAG), and the Federal Social Court (BSG).

Ahead of the 2013 elections, Peer Steinbrück included Zypries in his shadow cabinet for the Social Democrats' campaign to unseat incumbent Angela Merkel as chancellor. During the campaign, Zypries served as shadow minister for consumer protection. In the negotiations to form a so-called Grand Coalition following the elections, she led the SPD delegation in the working group on digital policy; her co-chair was Dorothee Bär of the CSU.

Following the formation of the grand coalition in December 2013, Zypries was appointed Parliamentary State Secretary in the Federal Ministry of Economics and Energy. In January 2014, she became the government's coordinator for aviation and space policies.

In February 2014, Zypries accompanied German President Joachim Gauck on a state visit to India – where they met with Prime Minister Manmohan Singh and Sonia Gandhi, among others – and Myanmar.

In June 2016, Zypries announced that she would not stand in the 2017 federal elections but instead resign from active politics by the end of the parliamentary term.

=== Minister for Economic Affairs and Energy (2017–2018) ===
In a cabinet reshuffle following the nomination of Frank-Walter Steinmeier as candidate for the federal presidency, Zypries was appointed Minister for Economic Affairs and Energy on 27 January 2017. She succeeded Sigmar Gabriel, who took the office of Minister for Foreign Affairs from Steinmeier.

During her time in office, Zypries led the government's efforts to save Germany's then second-largest airline Air Berlin. When the company filed for bankruptcy protection in August 2017, she authorized a bridging loan of 150 million euros ($176 million) to allow Air Berlin to keep its planes in the air for three months and secure the jobs of its 7,200 workers in Germany while negotiations with Lufthansa continue.

In the negotiations to form a fourth coalition government under Chancellor Angela Merkel following the 2017 federal elections, Zypries led the working group on economic affairs, alongside Thomas Strobl and Alexander Dobrindt.

== Later career ==
From 2019 to 2023, Zypries served as ombudsperson for BDIU, the national association of Germany's credit management, debt collection and debt purchase sector. In 2020, she took on a similar role in implementing the settlement agreed between Volkswagen and the Federation of German Consumer Organisations (VZBV) following the company's emissions scandal. In 2021, she was appointed to co-chair – alongside Theo Waigel – an independent expert commission established by audit firm Ernst & Young to assess its involvement in the Wirecard scandal.

Since 2023, Zypries has been serving as ombudsperson at German private credit bureau Schufa.

== Other activities ==
=== Corporate boards ===
- Bombardier Transportation, member of the supervisory board (since 2019)
- Deutsches Institut für Service-Qualität (DISQ), chairwoman of the advisory board (since 2019)
- KfW, ex-officio deputy chairwoman of the board of supervisory directors (2017–2018)
- RAG-Stiftung, ex-officio member of the board of trustees (2017–2018)
- Deutsche Bahn, member of the supervisory board (2016–2017)
- German Investment Corporation (DEG), ex-officio member of the supervisory board (2013–2017)
- Deutsche Gesellschaft für Internationale Zusammenarbeit (GIZ), ex-officio member of the supervisory board (2013–2017)
- DB Mobility Logistics, member of the supervisory board (2013–2015)

=== Non-profit organizations ===
- German Table Tennis Association (DTTB), Member of the Ethics Commission (since 2020)
- betterplace.org, Member of the supervisory board (since 2018)
- Business Forum of the Social Democratic Party of Germany, member of the political advisory board (since 2018)
- Christliches Jugenddorfwerk Deutschlands, member of the board of trustees
- Deutsche Nationalstiftung, member of the board of trustees
- German Poland Institute, member of the board of trustees
- HSE Foundation, member of the board of trustees
- German Israeli Lawyer's Association (DIJV), president
- German Institute for Economic Research (DIW), Department of Gender Studies, member of the Circle of Supporters
- Friedrich Ebert Foundation, member of the board of trustees
- Gustav Heinemann Civic Award of the SPD, member of the board of trustees
- Institute for Sports, Business & Society (ISBS) at the EBS University of Business and Law, member of the board of trustees
- Das Progressive Zentrum, member of the Circle of Friends
- Rotary Club, member
- National Paralympic Committee Germany, chairwoman of the board of trustees (2009–2015)
- Aktive Bürgerschaft, member of the board of trustees (-2014)
- Federal Agency for Civic Education, alternate member of the board of trustees (2010–2013)
- Magnus Hirschfeld Foundation, alternate member of the board of trustees (2011–2013)
- German Foundation for International Legal Cooperation (IRZ), member (2009–2013)
- German Association for Small and Medium-Sized Businesses (BVMW), member of the political advisory board (2009–2013)
- Zeitschrift für Rechtspolitik (ZRP), co-editor (2009–2013)
- ELNET (organization), Member of the advisory council

== Political positions ==
Zypries is considered a proponent of regulating more tightly access to Internet platforms such as Google, Facebook, Amazon.com and Apple Inc.’s iTunes. A joint letter to the European Commission in November 2014, signed by Zypries and her French counterpart Axelle Lemaire on behalf of the German and French governments, suggested “essential” digital platforms should potentially be brought under existing rules for telecoms markets, a standalone regulation or specially tailored antitrust rules.

Zypries is a supporter of the Campaign for the Establishment of a United Nations Parliamentary Assembly, an organisation which advocates for democratic reformation of the United Nations.

== Controversies ==
Ending a nasty diplomatic dispute between the United States and Germany, Zypries announced at the United States Holocaust Memorial Museum in 2006 that the German government was dropping its decades-long resistance to opening the archives kept at the International Tracing Service in the town of Bad Arolsen.

On 3 June 2007, Zypries caused some controversy by saying at a meeting of G8 justice ministers in Munich that it should be assumed that missing British child Madeleine McCann was abducted by a gang that passes on children to be abused.

In response to a 2007 meeting between chancellor Angela Merkel and the Dalai Lama, China canceled a high-level meeting on the protection of intellectual property rights of Chinese legal experts and Zypries in retaliation. A statement from the German Justice Ministry later said the meeting was called off "for technical reasons." The opposition Green Party, which was in coalition with then-Chancellor Gerhard Schröder's Social Democrats from 1998 to 2005, also praised Merkel's stance.
