= Daniela Wagner =

German politician (born 1957)

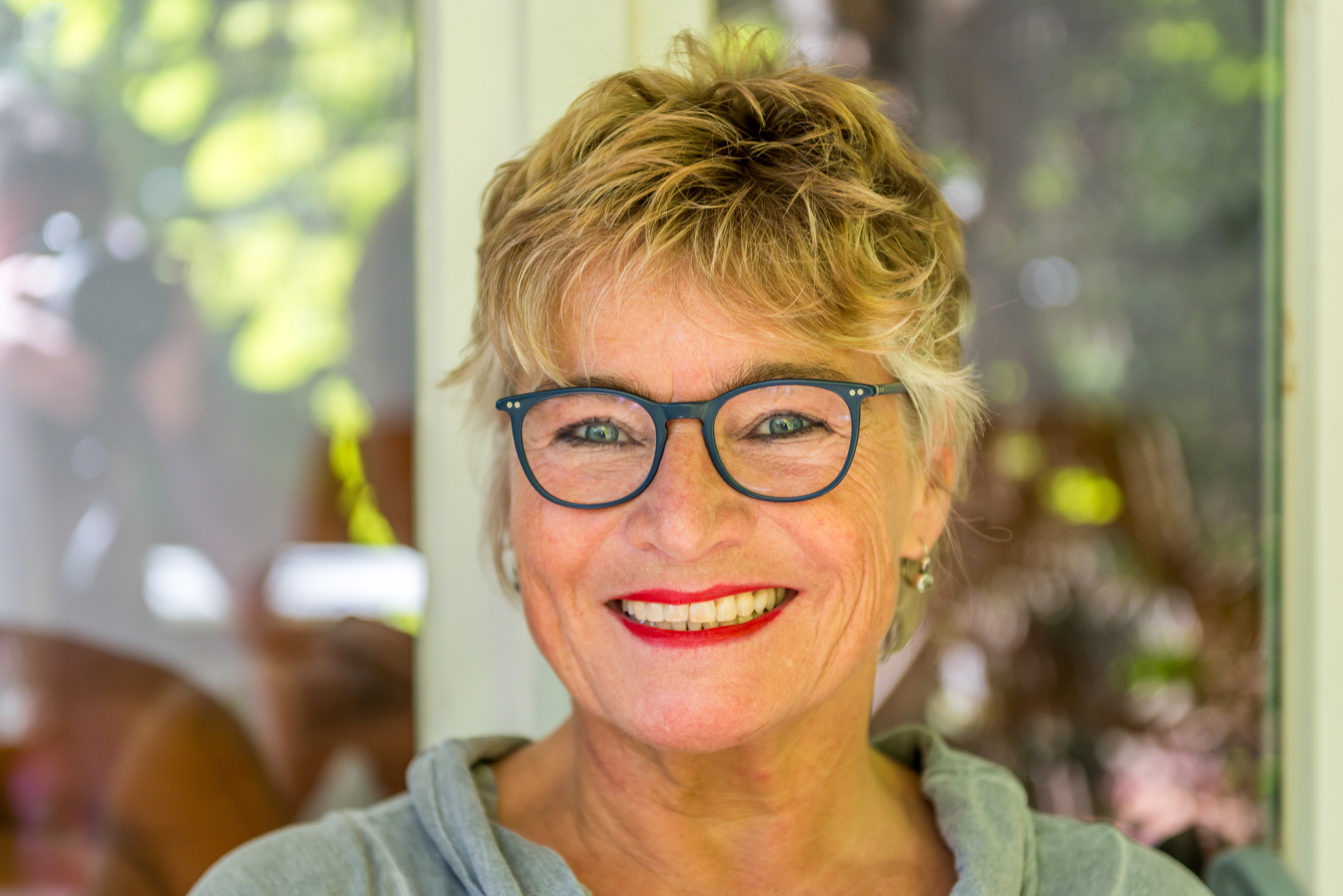
- Daniela Wagner in 2017

Member of the Bundestag
- Incumbent
- Assumed office 2017

Personal details
- Born: 4 April 1957 (age 69) Darmstadt, West Germany (now Germany)
- Party: Greens
- Children: 1

Daniela Wagner (born 4 April 1957) is a German politician of the Alliance 90/The Greens who has served as a member of the Bundestag from the state of Hesse from 2009 'til 2013 and since 2017. Wagner serves on the Committee on Construction, Housing, Urban Development and Municipalities and of the Committee on Transport and Digital Infrastructure. In addition, she is a Member of the Supervisory Board of Neue Wohnraumhilfe and Darmstädter Stadtentwicklungsgesellschaft (DSE).

== Early life and career ==
Wagner attended the Georg Büchner School in Darmstadt from 1968 to 1977. After graduating from high school, she studied German and English for the teaching profession in Frankfurt am Main from 1977 to 1978. From 1979 to 1981 she studied political science, law and economics at the University of Oldenburg and from 1982 to 1988 at the TH Darmstadt, both times without graduating.

== Political career ==
From 1987 to 1994, Wagner served as a member of the Landtag of Hesse.

Wagner was a member of the Bundestag from 2009 to 2013. She was able to return in 2017. In parliament, she serves on the Committee on Construction, Housing, Urban Development and Municipalities and of the Committee on Transport and Digital Infrastructure. For her parliamentary group she is spokesperson for urban development.

In addition to her committee assignments, Wagner has been a substitute member of the German delegation to the Parliamentary Assembly of the Council of Europe (PACE) since 2018. In this capacity, she serves on the Committee on Equality and Non-Discrimination.

== Other activities ==
- Neue Wohnraumhilfe, Member of the Supervisory Board (since 2004)
- Darmstädter Stadtentwicklungsgesellschaft (DSE), Member of the Supervisory Board (since 2015)
