= Richard Hammar =

Richard Roy Hammar (born April 20, 1950) is the legal counsel for the Assemblies of God. He has authored more than 50 books and circulates two bi-monthly newsletters. As a CPA, he specializes in legal and tax issues for religious and non-profit organizations and is one of 270 Professional Registered Parliamentarians in the United States. He has worked in this field since 1978 and specializes in church law and tax issues.

== Education and career ==
Hammar studied pre-law at Augustana College in Rock Island, Illinois, graduating in 1972. Following graduation from college he enrolled at Valparaiso University School of Law and was later admitted to Harvard Law School, where he earned an LL.M. degree. He was initially employed as an attorney for the United States Department of Defense. In 1978, Hammar became the first legal counsel for the Assemblies of God denomination headquartered in Springfield, Missouri, a role he occupies to this day, and in 1987, he became a co-partner in a publishing company (Christian Ministry Resources). In that capacity, he wrote several books and two popular newsletters devoted to the legal, tax, financial, and risk management issues of relevance to religious organizations.

His books include Pastor, Church & Law, the annual Church and Clergy Tax Guide, Church Finance, the Church Guide to Copyright Law, the biannual Handbook of Church Compensation, and individual tax guides for church denominations. He has also written the Church Law & Tax Report newsletter since 1987, has contributed articles to numerous journals and publications, and is a frequent speaker at legal and tax conferences such as NACBA's The Church Network conference. He co-founded, with Cambridge University in England, an international program in risk management for religious organizations. In 1992, he published a video and book (Reducing the Risk of Child Abuse in Your Church) which was distributed and has assisted religious organizations in managing the risk of child sexual abuse.

== Personal ==
Hammar and his wife have three children and five grandchildren, and he credits his wife with his conversion to Christianity. Hammar is also an active amateur astronomer.
