= Karl Rauber =

Swiss painter

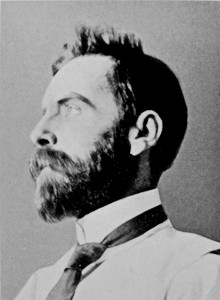
Karl Rauber (date unknown)

Karl Rauber (8 August 1866, in Konstanz – 5 August 1909, in Solothurn) was a Swiss history, landscape, and genre painter.

== Life and work ==
He was the son of Theodor Rauber (1841–1897), a music director and teacher. He began his studies at the Kunstgewerbeschule in Karlsruhe in 1884. Two years later, he enrolled at the Academy of Fine Arts there. His primary instructors were Ferdinand Keller, Caspar Ritter and Ernst Schurth. He became a master student of Claus Meyer in 1890. It was then he started to focus on historical scenes, mostly of a religious nature.

After 1894, following advice from Leopold von Kalckreuth, he switched to landscape painting, "en plein aire". His first major exhibition came in 1896, at the Swiss Salon of the Schweizerische Landesausstellung in Geneva. That same year, he moved to Baden and set up a studio in a former Salvation Army kitchen. He continued to paint Swiss landscapes, however, travelling to Limmattal, Wehntal, Glatttal, and the Katzensee. He also created an occasional religious work; notably a mural of the Last Supper for the village church in Wettingen; designed by the architect, Karl Moser.

Due to a chronic stomach ailment, he gave up his studio in 1905 and moved to Solothurn, seeking a healthier climate. He died there four years later.

== Sources ==
- Erwin Haller: "Rauber, Karl", In: Argovia. Jahresschrift der Historischen Gesellschaft des Kantons Aargau, Vols.68–69, 1958, pp. 603–604 (Online).
- E. Reinhart: "Rauber, Karl", In: Carl Brun (Ed.): Schweizerisches Künstler-Lexikon. Vol.2: H–R. Huber & Co., Frauenfeld 1908, pg.596 (Karl Rauber at the Internet Archive).
- "Rauber, Karl", In: Schweizerisches Künstler-Lexikon. Vol.4: Supplement A–Z. Huber & Co., Frauenfeld 1917, pg.357 (Karl Rauber at the Internet Archive
