= Bickenbach, Hesse =

Bickenbach
- Municipality
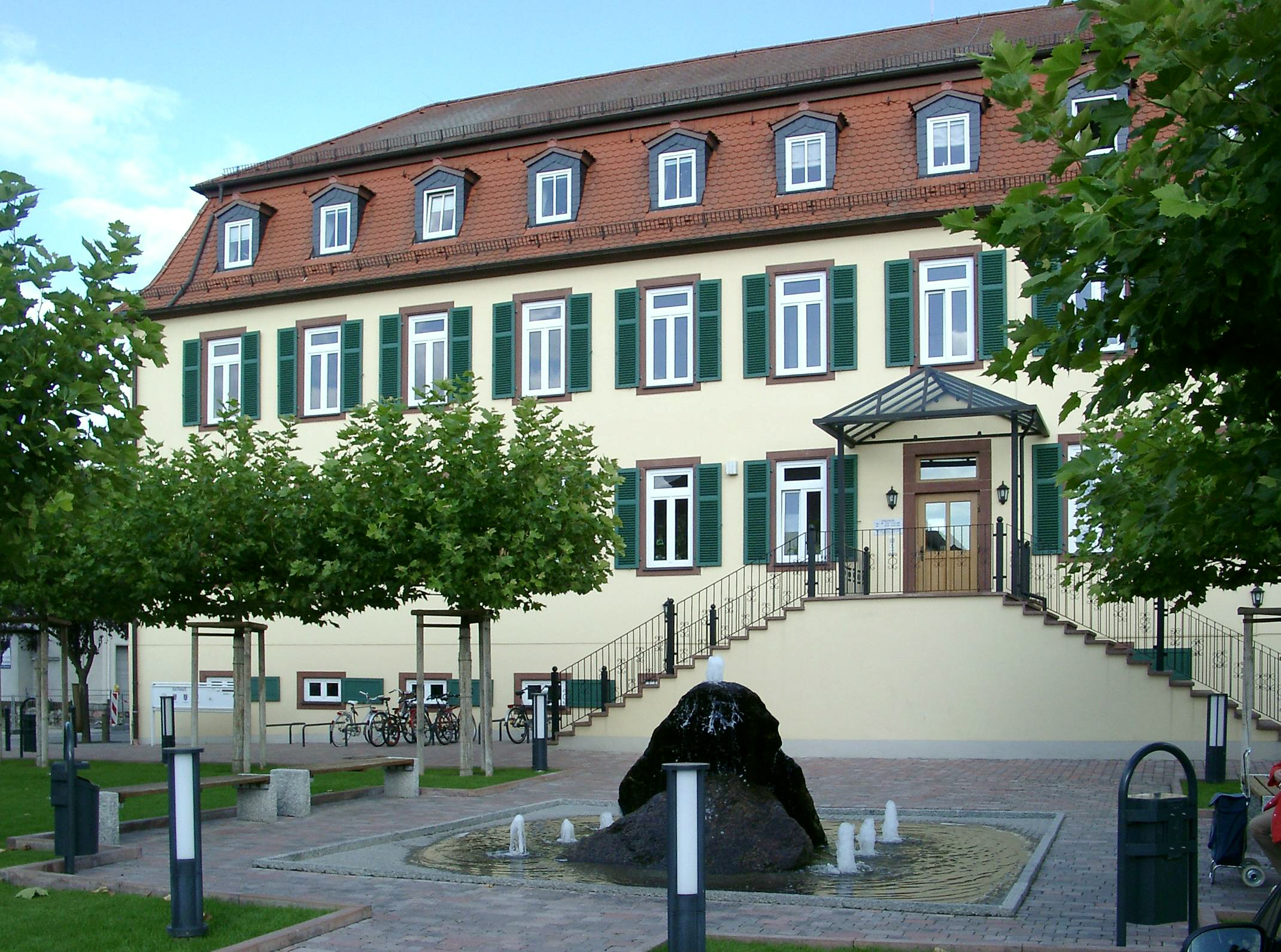
- Town hall

- Coat of arms

- Location of Bickenbach within Darmstadt-Dieburg district
- Interactive map of Bickenbach
- Location within Germany Location within Hesse
- Coordinates: 49°46′N 8°37′E
- Country: Germany
- State: Hesse
- Admin. region: Darmstadt
- District: Darmstadt-Dieburg

Government
  - Mayor (2023–29): Markus Hennemann (SPD)

Area
  - Total: 9.26 km^{2} (3.58 sq mi)
- Elevation: 119 m (390 ft)

Population (2025-12-31)
  - Total: 6,085
  - Density: 657/km^{2} (1,700/sq mi)
- Time zone: UTC+01:00 (CET)
  - Summer (DST): UTC+02:00 (CEST)
- Postal codes: 64402–64404
- Dialling codes: 06257
- Vehicle registration: DA
- Website: www.bickenbach-bergstrasse.de

Bickenbach (German pronunciation: [ˈbɪkn̩bax]) is a municipality in the Darmstadt-Dieburg district of Hesse, Germany. It is situated on the Hessische Bergstraße wine region.

== Political geography ==
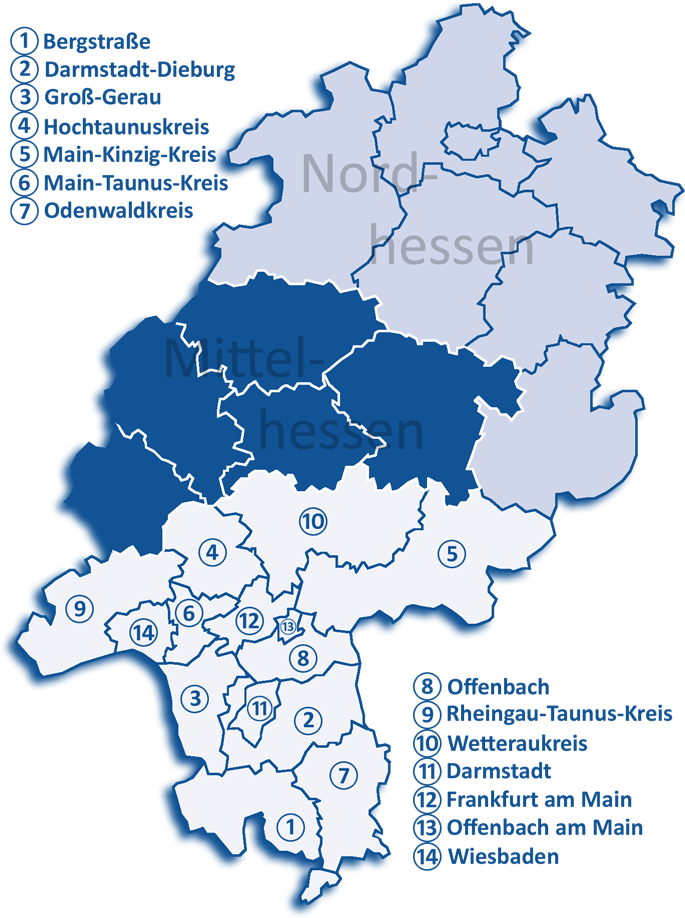

The federal state of Hesse is divided into three administrative regions (Regierungsbezirk); Bickenbach is located in the most southerly of these regions - Darmstadt. There are fourteen districts (landkreise) within this region; Bickenbach is located in the southern district of Darmstadt-Dieburg. The district surrounds the city of Darmstadt proper. Neighbouring districts include Offenbach to the north, Gross-Gerau to the west, Bergstrasse to the south-west and Odenwaldkreis to the south-east. To the east lies the district of Miltenberg which forms the border with the federal state of Bavaria.
