= Richard Hammer (politician) =

German politician (1897–1969)

Member of the Bundestag; from Hesse
- In office 7 September 1949 – 15 October 1957
- Preceded by: Constituency established
- Succeeded by: Multi-member district
- Constituency: Darmstadt (1949–1953); State list (1953–1957)

Member of the Landtag of Hesse
- In office 1 December 1946 – 9 December 1949
- Preceded by: Multi-member district
- Succeeded by: Nikolaus Schiergens
- Constituency: State list

Personal details
- Born: 7 February 1897 Darmstadt, Germany
- Died: 3 October 1969 (aged 72) Darmstadt, West Germany
- Party: Free Democratic Party

Richard Hammer (7 February 1897 – 3 October 1969) was a German politician of the Free Democratic Party (FDP) and former member of the German Bundestag.

== Political career ==
Hammer was a member of the Landtag of Hesse from 1946 to 9 December 1949. He was a member of the Bundestag from its first election in 1949 to 1957. In 1949 he was directly elected in Darmstadt with 36.8% of the valid votes cast, and in 1953 he entered parliament via the Hessian FDP state list. From 7 December 1949, he had been chairman of the Bundestag's Committee on Health Care.

== Literature ==
Herbst, Ludolf; Jahn, Bruno (2002). Vierhaus, Rudolf (ed.). Biographisches Handbuch der Mitglieder des Deutschen Bundestages. 1949–2002 [Biographical Handbook of the Members of the German Bundestag. 1949–2002] (in German). München: De Gruyter - De Gruyter Saur. p. 1715. ISBN 978-3-11-184511-1.
