= Groschlag =

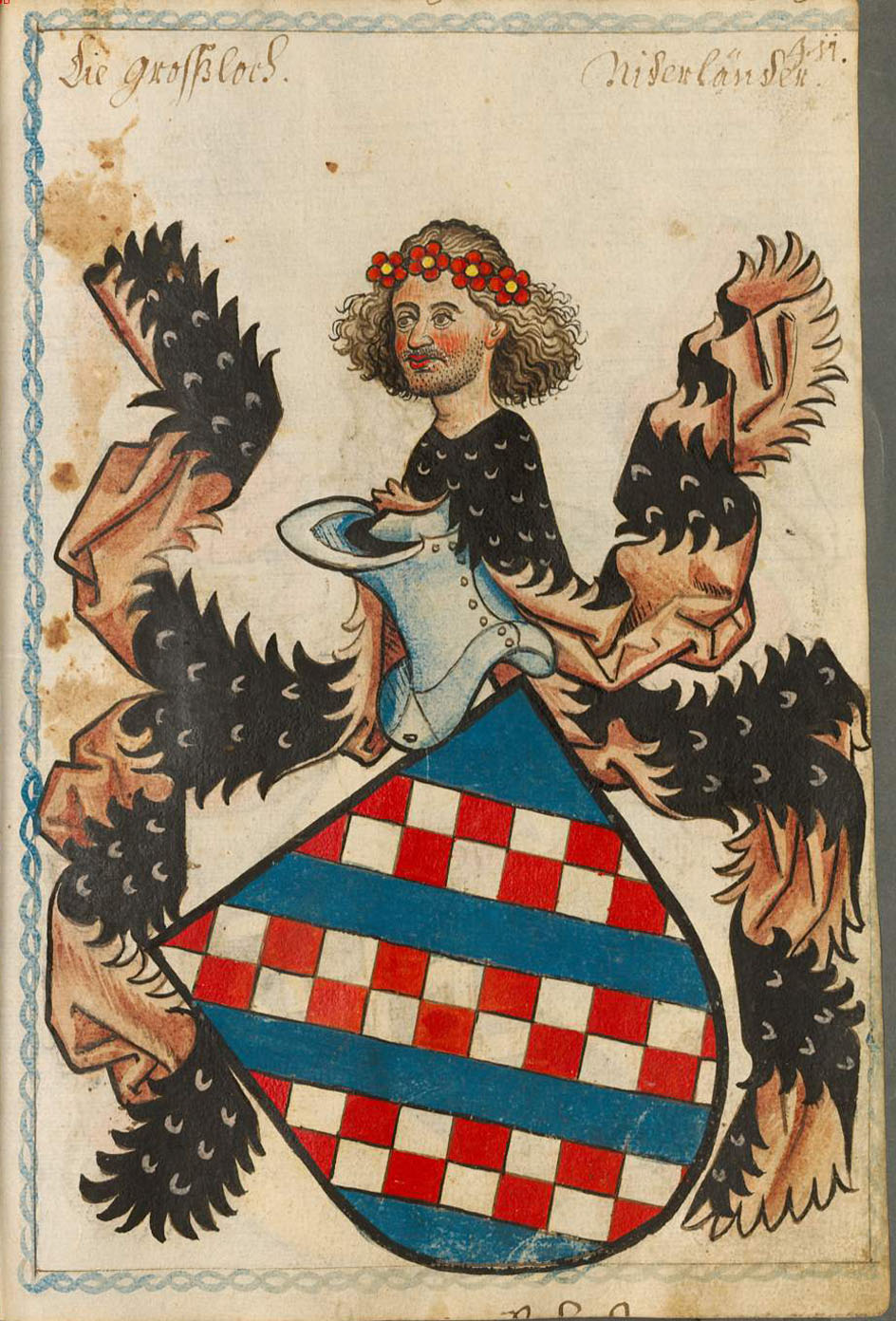
Coat of arms of Groschlag family

The Groschlag family was an ancient family of German nobility in the County of Mark, extinct in 1799.

== History ==
The knights of Groschlag were vogts (reeves) at Eppertshausen in the Carolingian Empire.

In the 14th century, they were employed as castle officials in Dieburg in the Archbishopric of Mainz. They entered into a long-lasting territorial feud with the counts of Hanau. In the 1355 Weistum of Babenhausen, the counts of Hanau are represented as the highest-ranking nobility of the Mark, with the knights of Groschlag following in second place.

In the 17th century, the Groschlag family married into the powerful Schönborn aristocracy, rising to higher status in the principality of Mainz. The male line of the Groschlags was extinct in 1799, with a surviving daughter, Countess Maria Anna Philippine Walburga of Lerchenfeld-Köfering (1775-1854), who served as lady in waiting to Queen Caroline of Bavaria, inheriting Eppertshausen.
