= Eppertshausen =

- Municipality
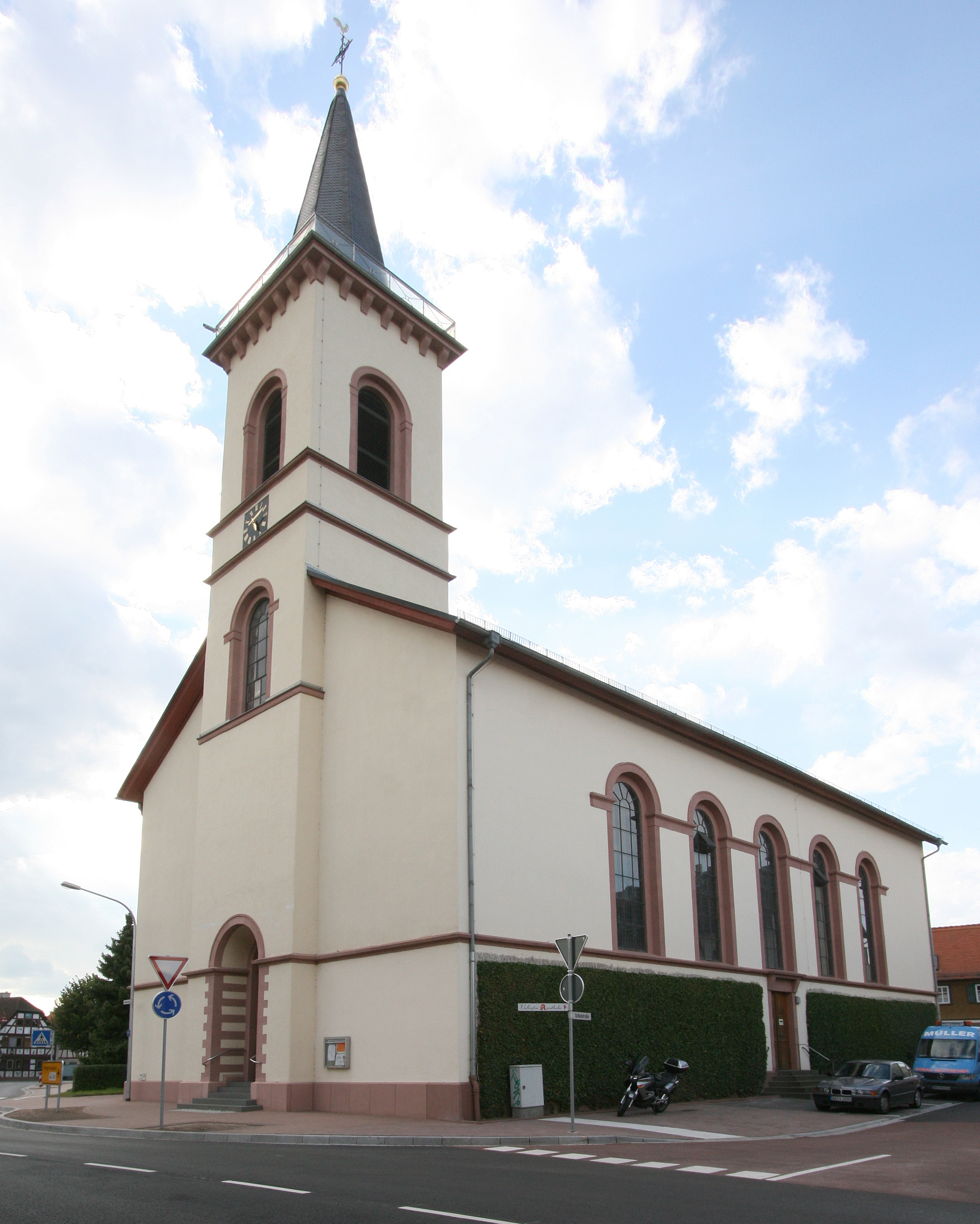
- Saint Sebastian Church

- Coat of arms

- Location of Eppertshausen within Darmstadt-Dieburg district
- Interactive map of Eppertshausen
- Location within Germany Location within Hesse
- Coordinates: 49°57′N 08°51′E
- Country: Germany
- State: Hesse
- Admin. region: Darmstadt
- District: Darmstadt-Dieburg

Government
  - Mayor (2020–26): Carsten Helfmann (CDU)

Area
  - Total: 13.11 km^{2} (5.06 sq mi)
- Elevation: 144 m (472 ft)

Population (2025-12-31)
  - Total: 6,398
  - Density: 488.0/km^{2} (1,264/sq mi)
- Time zone: UTC+01:00 (CET)
  - Summer (DST): UTC+02:00 (CEST)
- Postal codes: 64859
- Dialling codes: 0 60 71
- Vehicle registration: DA
- Website: www.eppertshausen.de

Eppertshausen is a municipality in southern Hesse, in the district Darmstadt-Dieburg, Germany. The municipality has a total population of about 6,429 inhabitants. Currently, the mayor is Carsten Helfmann, re-elected in 2020.
