= List of places in Hesse =

This is a list of geographical features in the state of Hesse, Germany.

== Mountain ranges ==
- Hermannsberg
- Kellerwald
- Odenwald
- Rhön
- Spessart
- Taunus
- Vogelsberg
- Westerwald

=== Additional ===
- Emmet (Upland)

== Hills ==
- Arennest
- Bensberg (Langenberge)
- Elfbuchen
- Elzer Berg
- Escheberg
- Frauenberg
- Großer Nickus
- Hangelstein
- Helfenstein (Habichtswald)
- Hemberg (ridge)
- Hemsberg
- Homberg (Hinterland)
- Hundsberg
- Hungert
- Kappe (Hinterland)
- Kleiner Nickus
- Moosberg (Reinhardswald)
- Naxburg
- Otzberg, hill and extinct volcano

== Rivers ==
- Eder
- Fulda
- Kinzig
- Lahn
- Main
- Rhine
- Schwalm
- Werra
- Weser

== Cities ==
see List of cities in Germany and List of cities in Hesse by population
