= Helfenstein =

Helfenstein can refer to:

- House of Helfenstein, a German noble family
- Helfenstein Castle, a ruined castle near Geislingen an der Steige, Baden-Württemberg, Germany; the former seat of the House of Helfenstein
- Helfenstein (Habichtswald), a hill in Hesse, Germany
- Château de Helfenstein, a ruined castle near Éguelshardt, Lorraine, France
- 8067 Helfenstein, a comet
- Sven Helfenstein (born 1982), Swiss ice hockey player
