= Otzberg Castle =

Medieval castle in Hesse, Germany

- castrum Othesberg; Veste Otzberg
- Hering
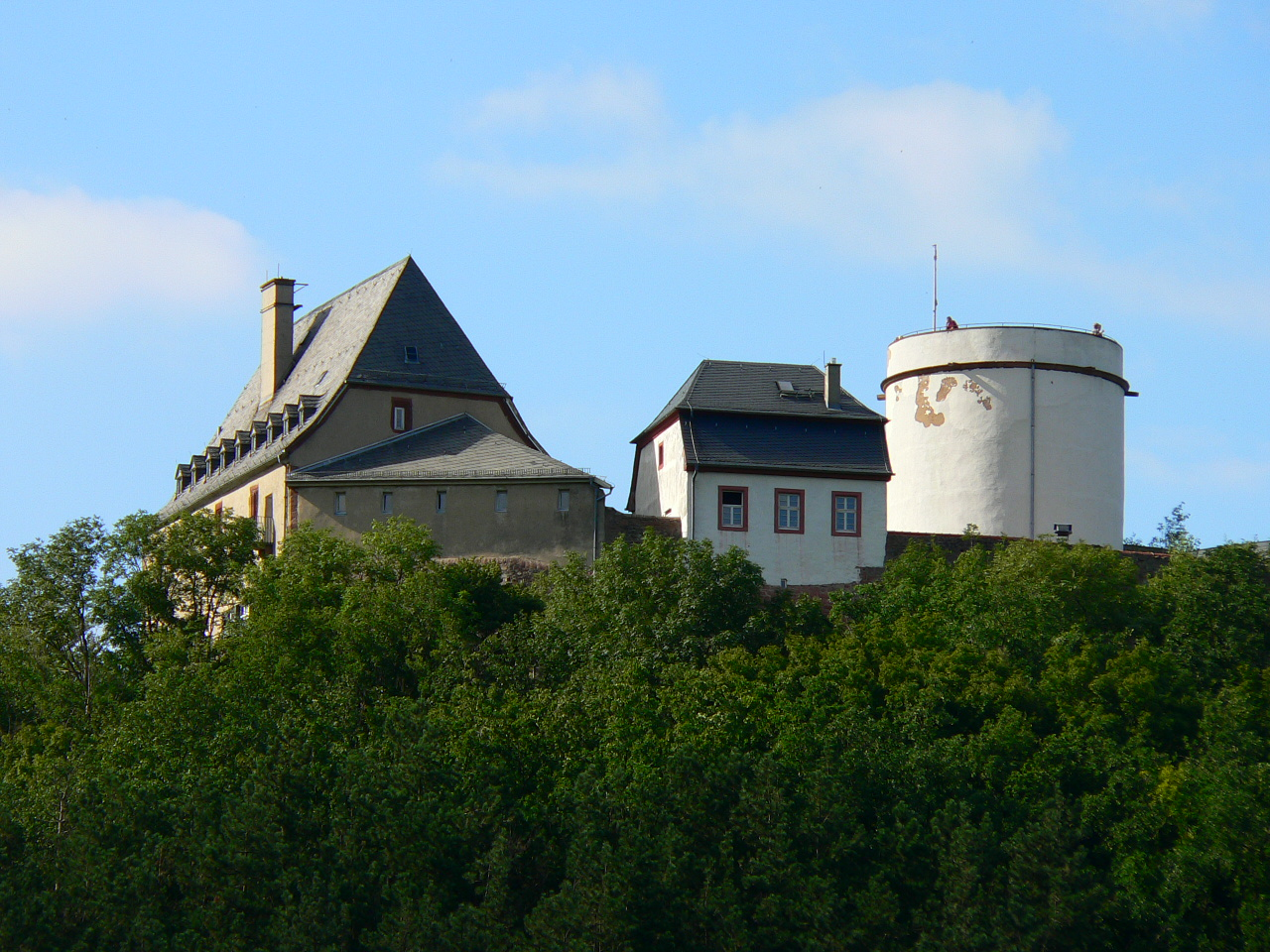
- Otzberg Castle seen from the southeast

Site information
- Type: hill castle
- Code: DE-HE
- Condition: Preserved with the exception of the barracks and cabinet

Location
- Location within Hesse Location within Germany
- Coordinates: 49°49′11″N 8°54′40″E
- Height: 367 m above sea level (NN)

Site history
- Built: First recorded in 1231

Garrison information
- Occupants: ministeriales

Otzberg Castle (German: Veste Otzberg) in the German state of Hesse is a medieval castle on the summit of the Otzberg in the Odenwald forest at a height of 367 m above NN. On its northern slopes is the village of Hering, which grew out of the lower ward or castellan's settlement. The history of castle and village is therefore closely interwoven.

== History ==
The region around the Otzberg probably belonged to the territory that King Pippin gifted in 766 A.D. to Fulda Abbey, together with Groß-Umstadt.

Otzberg Castle was probably built in the late 12th/early 13th century. At this time, Abbot Marquard I of Fulda secured the abbey estates and built castles that were visible from a long way as a sign of his influence.

...Here is a site for a castle…

He transferred the castle to Conrad of Hohenstaufen, brother of the Emperor Frederick Barbarossa, as vogt. Conrad was Count Palatine of the Rhine.

The castrum Othesberg was first mentioned in the records in 1231. In this document the Archbishop of Mainz, Siegfried III, also the overseer of Fulda Abbey, guaranteed to Count Palatine Otto II the arrangement agreed in the previous year, the details of which are unknown.

In 1244 the castellanos de odesbrech are mentioned for the first time: the castellans or Burgmannen of Otzberg Castle. The fortifications must have been sufficiently developed that five castellans and their servants were able to occupy it. The castellans built houses in the village of Hering, so-called "castellan's houses" or Burgmannenhäuser. Of these only parts of the house owned by Gans of Otzberg have survived.

In the early 14th century, the resources of Fulda Abbey ran out so, in 1332, Prince-Abbot Henry VI of Hohenberg enfeoffed Otzberg Castle and the Fulda part of Umstadt for 4,600 pounds of Heller to Werner of Anevelt and Engelhard of Franckenstein, who invested 200 pounds in improving the castle.

In 1374 Fulda redeemed the estate again, but in the same year enfeoffed Otsperg die burg ("Otzberg the castle"), Heringes die stat darundir ("Hering the town below it") and half of Umstadt for 23,875 guilders to Ulrich of Hanau. Ulrich spent 400 guilders on improvements to the castle.

In 1390 the abbey sold the three properties to the Count Palatine Rupert II. Their value in that transaction was 33,000 guilders.

In 1504 the Bavarian Feud partly involved Otzberg. In the dispute over the Landshut succession, Emperor Maximilian imposed the imperial ban on Count Palatine Philip for a breach of the Landfrieden. Landgrave William II of Hesse seized Otzberg by force. After the Reichstag of Constance in 1507, the Electoral Palatinate received the Amt of Otzberg back again and did not enfeoff it again. But weapon technology had changed so that the castle could no longer simply be held by castellans. In 1511, a Zwinger was built, the inner wall was strengthened and a new gatehouse built.

In the mid-16th century a stone town wall was built around the lower ward (the village of Hering).

During the Thirty Years' War, a Bavarian corps of 2,000 men and imperial and Spanish troops camped in the area of Otzberg-Umstadt in 1621, and besieged Otzberg Castle. A year later, the garrison surrendered the castle. The castle and amt of Otzberg as well as half of Umstadt went back to Hesse in 1623 as compensation for war damage suffered.

In 1647 the French took the castle. They based themselves at the castle and helped themselves to the food and provisions. As a result of the Peace of Westphalia in 1648 Otzberg was returned to the Palatinate.

Although the whole of the Palatinate was in French hands during the Napoleonic Wars, the two Ämter of Otzberg and Umstadt remained Electoral Palatine. At that time the Palatine Archives were stored at Otzberg Castle, in which one can read the property claims for a new era.

With the stabilisation of the political situation, Otzberg Castle lost its military importance for the Palatinate. From 1711, active service soldiers were gradually replaced by disabled veterans, so that from 1720 the castle was purely an invalids' garrison that guarded the prisoners incarcerated there.

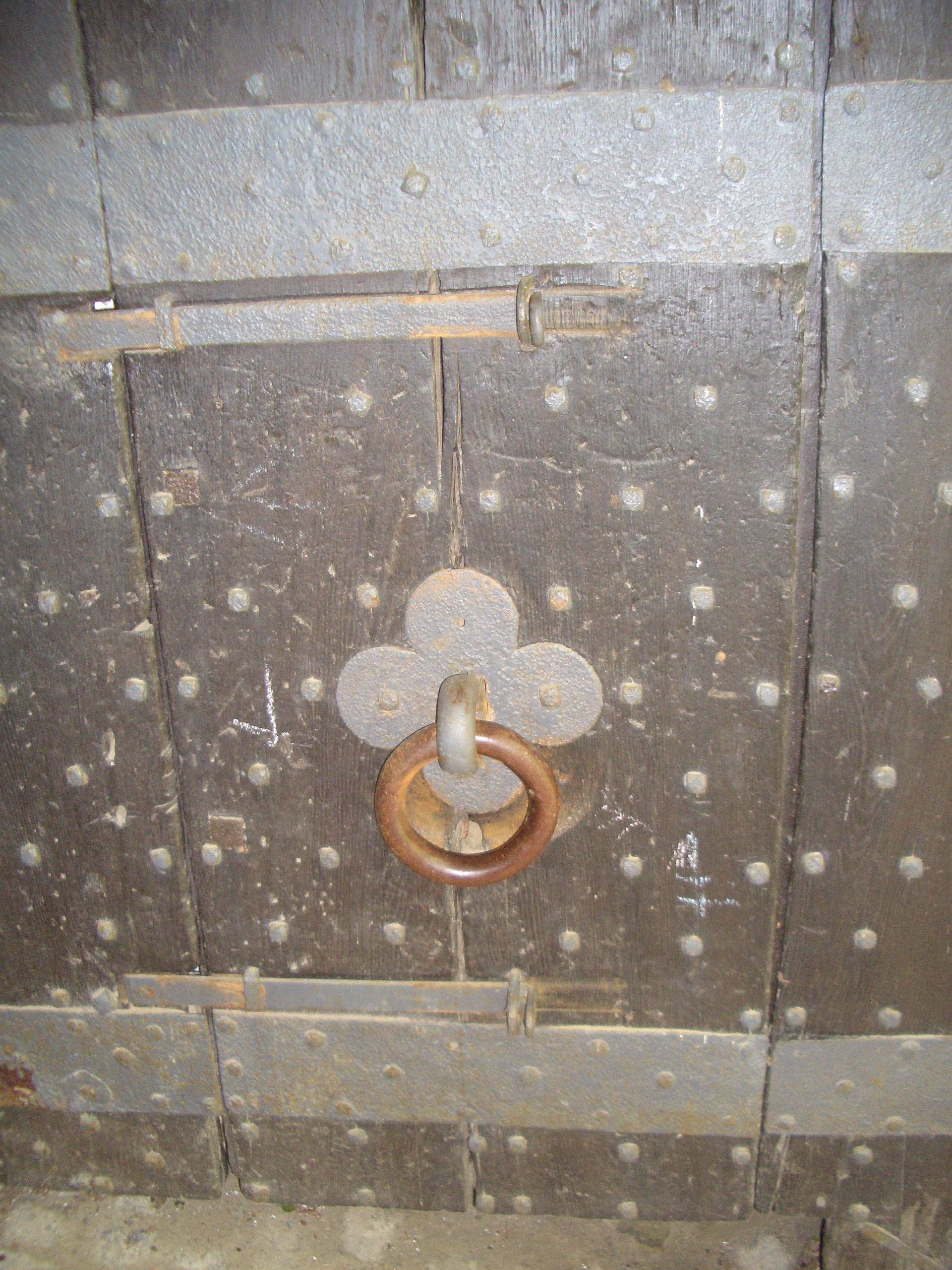
According to legend, whoever bites through this ring owns the castle

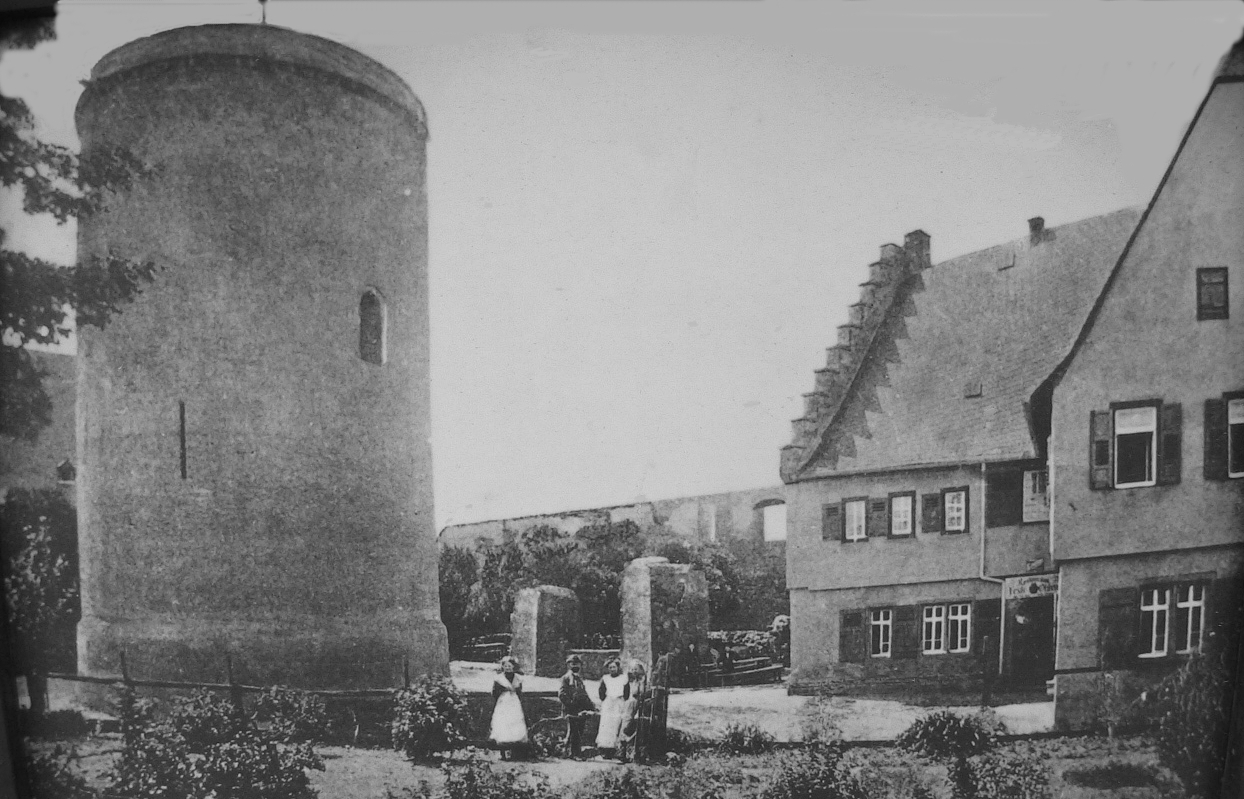
The inner courtyard in 1900

In 1802 the Electoral Palatine Oberamt of Otzberg went to the Landgraviate of Hesse-Darmstadt, which used it from 1803 as a state prison.

In 1818 Otzberg Castle was abandoned as a military location.

On 25 July 1826 the Finance Ministry in Darmstadt issued a decree that the tower of the castle, the commandant's house with its small stables, the doctor's house, the stable near the Marketenderei, the well house and the new barracks (Bandhaus) should be preserved. All other buildings should be sold for demolition.

In 1921 the Bandhaus was converted into a youth hostel.

In the 1950s a forestry office and a restaurant were housed in the commandant's house. This arrangement continued until the mid-60s when the place was rented to various tenants to run the restaurant.

In 1985, the Bandhaus became a museum, the Collection of Folk Art in Hesse (Sammlung zur Volkskunde in Hessen). In 1996 the Korporalshaus was rebuilt. It has since been used as a museum building and location for the Standesamt of the municipality of Otzberg.

== Military ==
The occupants from the outset were soldiers; in the 14th century, six men lived there; around 1471 there were 14 people. Specialised paid soldiers first appeared in the 16th century when the place was converted into a defensible fortification.

== Description ==
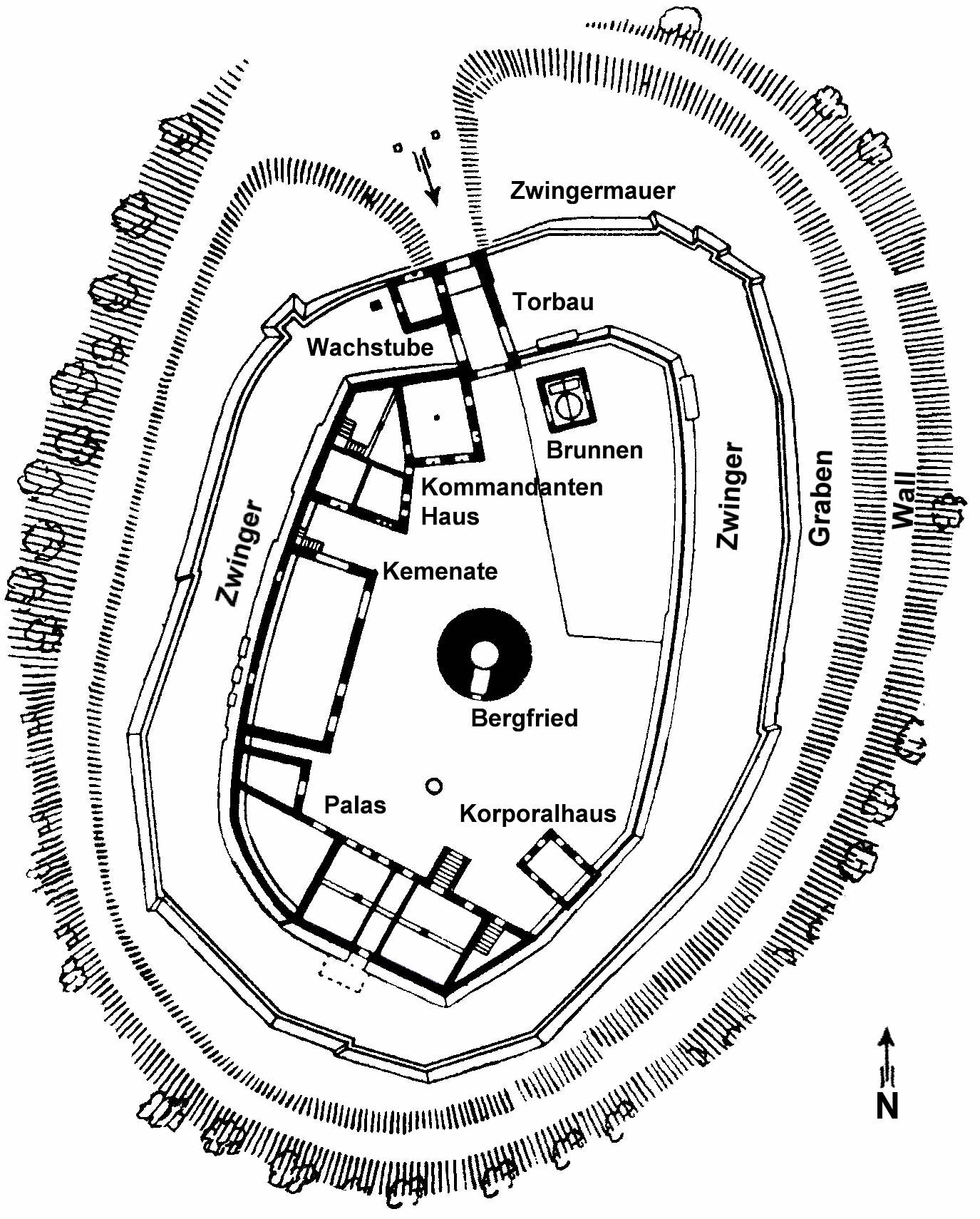
Plan of Otzberg Castle

The appearance of the fortress is dominated by its double concentric walls built in the 16th century and oval in shape, and the bergfried which is of Romanesque origin. Its character is still that of a fortress from the time after the introduction of artillery, typical castle features, like towers are entirely missing.

=== Bergfried ===
The bergfried, also known locally as the Weiße Rübe ("White Beet", also the name for the wild turnip), is the oldest building in the castle. On clear days the visitor can see the whole of the county of Darmstadt-Dieburg and as far as the city of Frankfurt am Main and the Taunus hills from the top of the 17-metre-high keep.

=== Well ===
The castle well dates to about 1320 and is one of the deepest wells in Hesse. After recent excavations the depth of the well has now been estimated as about 50 metres. Next to it is a 1788 treadwheel that made it considerably easier to raise water.

=== Commandant's house ===
The commandant's house (Kommandantenhaus), in which the castle pub is housed today, was built in 1574 together with several other new buildings.

=== Palas ===
The palas houses the Otzberg Museum – Documenting the history of Veste Otzberg.

=== Barracks/cabinet room ===
The old cabinet room was later used as a barrack. Due to the Hessian demolition decree (hessischen Abrissverfügung) of 1806 it was one of the few buildings that was destroyed at Otzberg Castle. Today, only the wall foundations remain.

=== Corporal's house ===
The "corporal's house" (Korporalshaus), rebuilt in 1996 is used as a registry by the municipality of Otzberg.

Buildings of Otzberg Castle

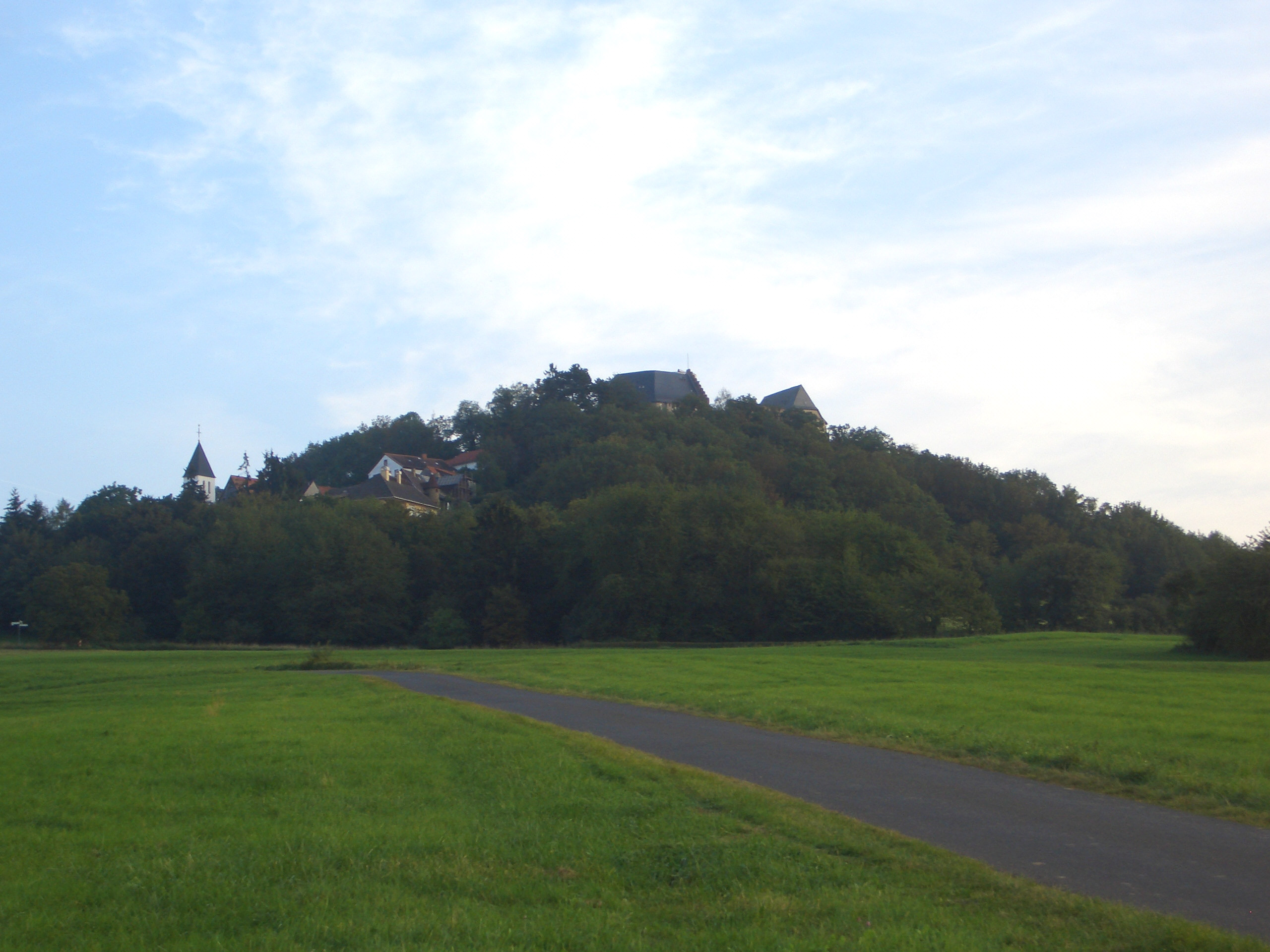
The Otzberg - north side

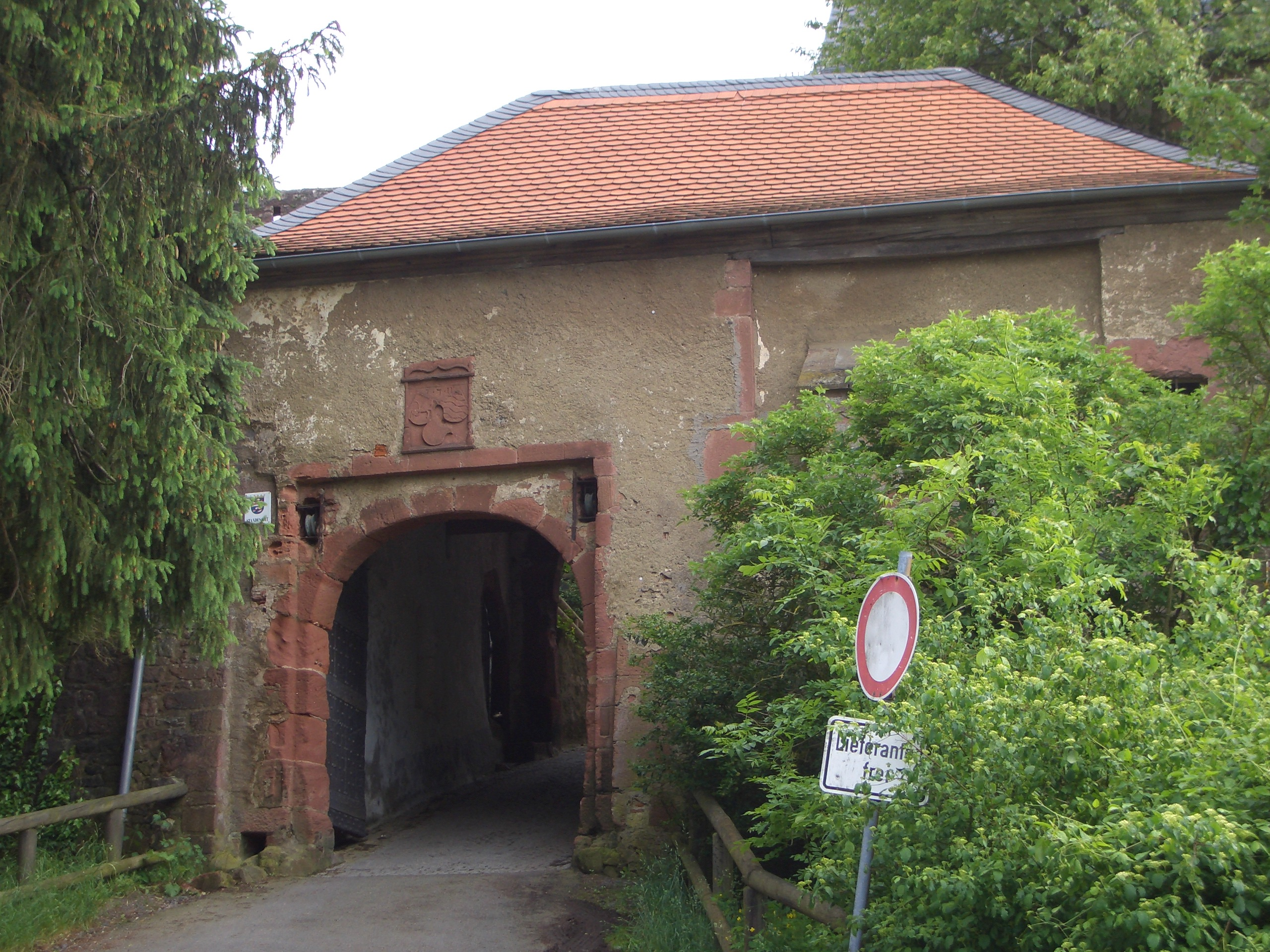
Gatehouse to the castle

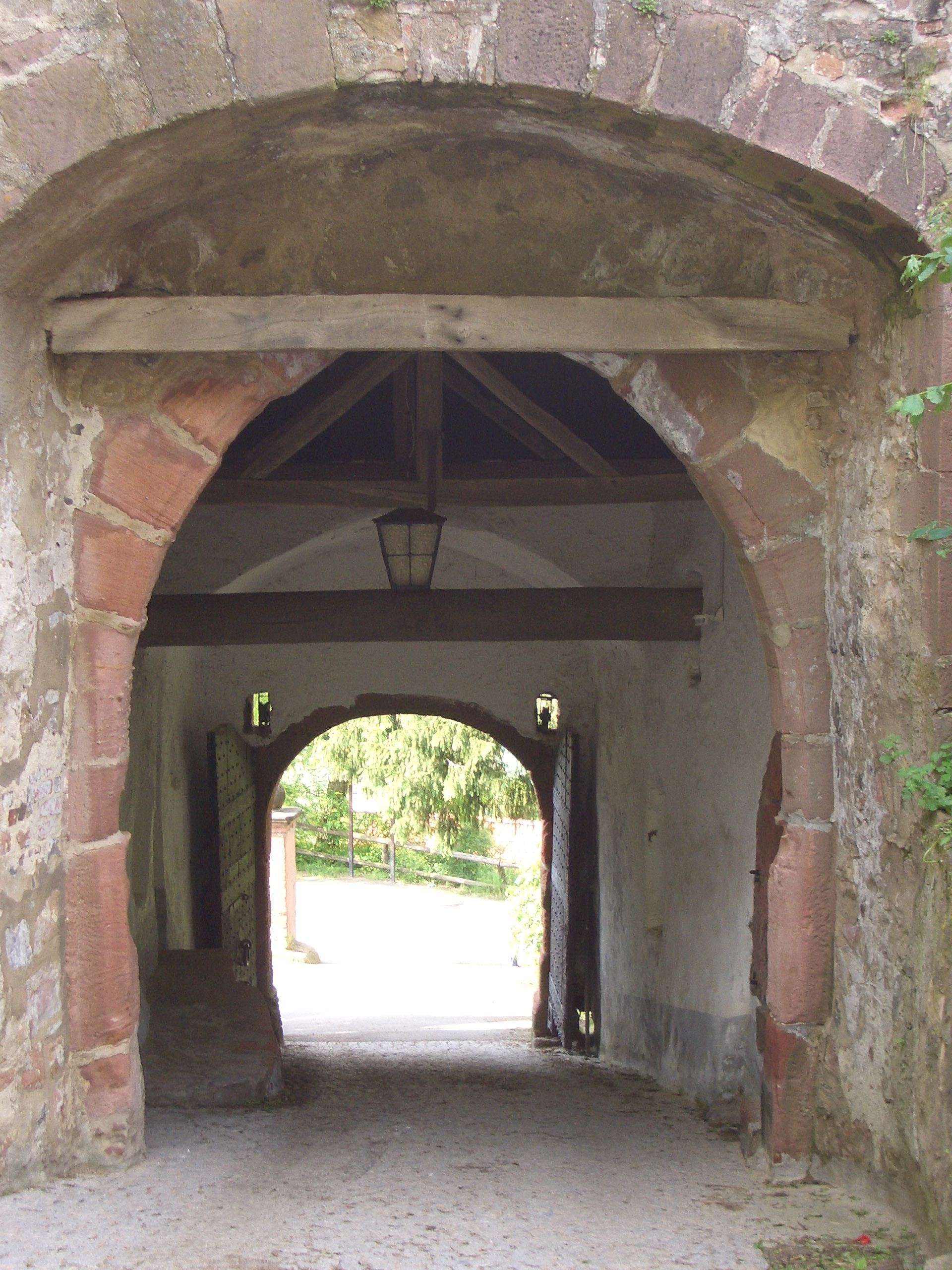
Gatehouse to the exit

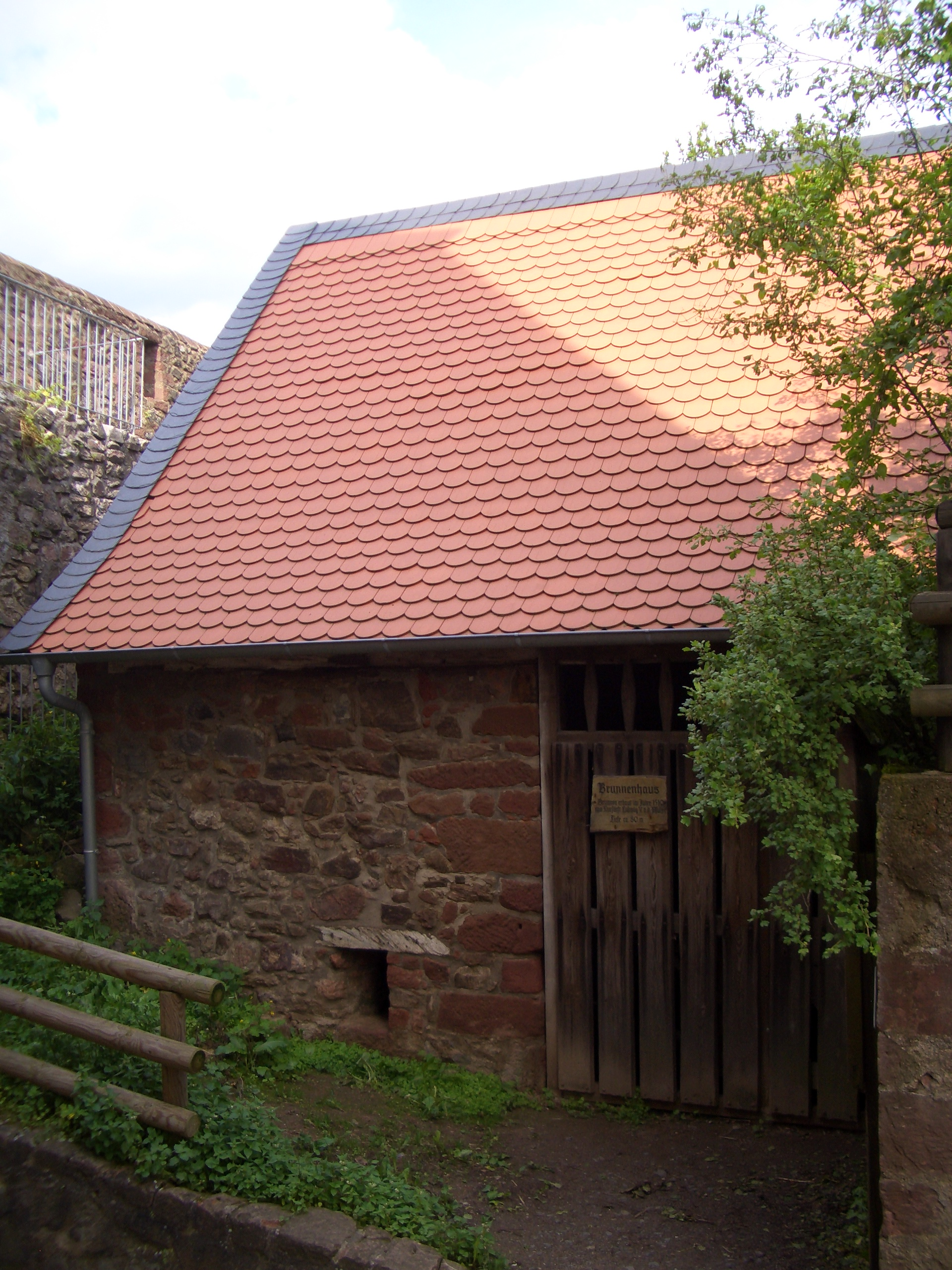
Well house

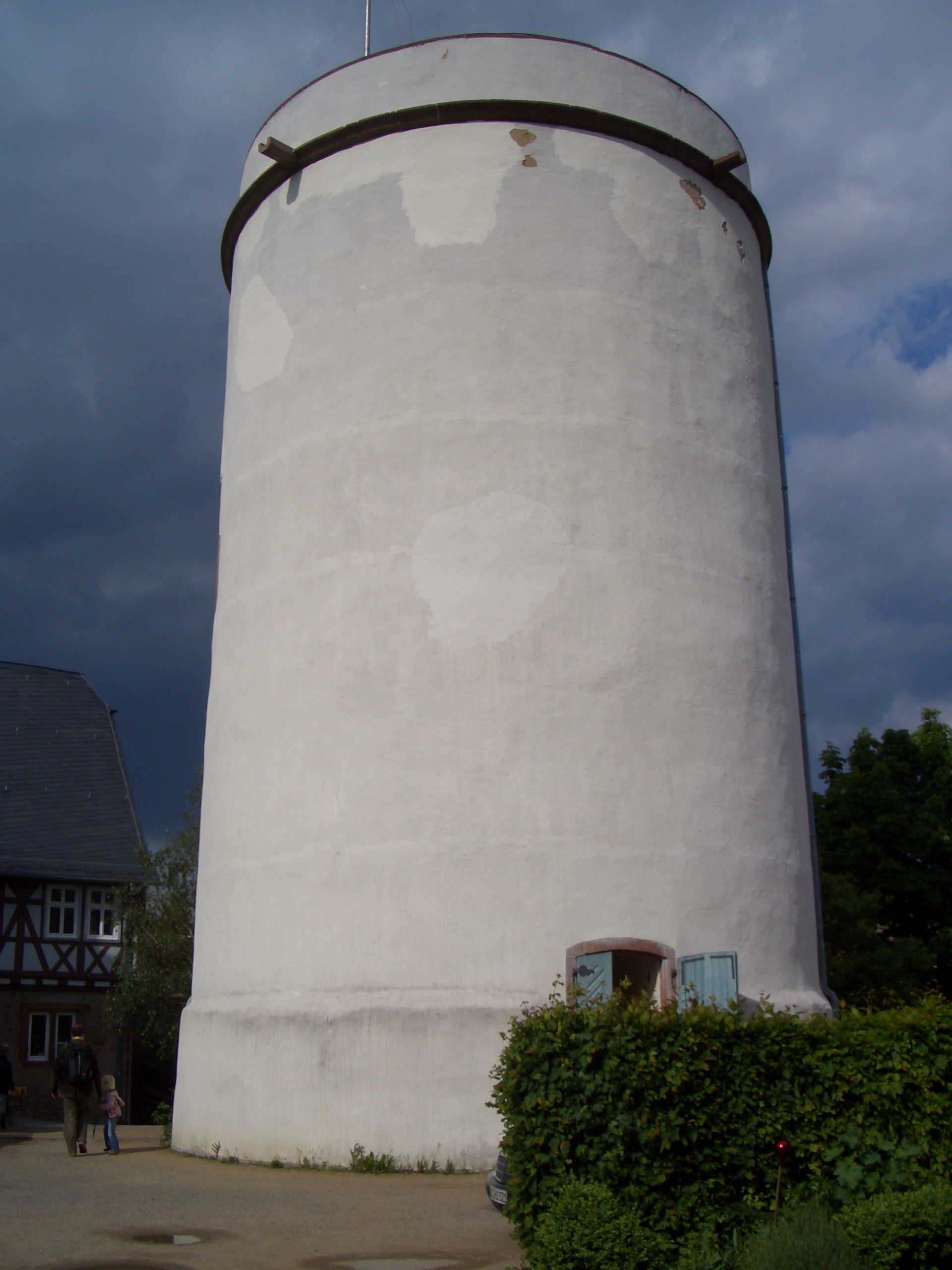
The bergfried

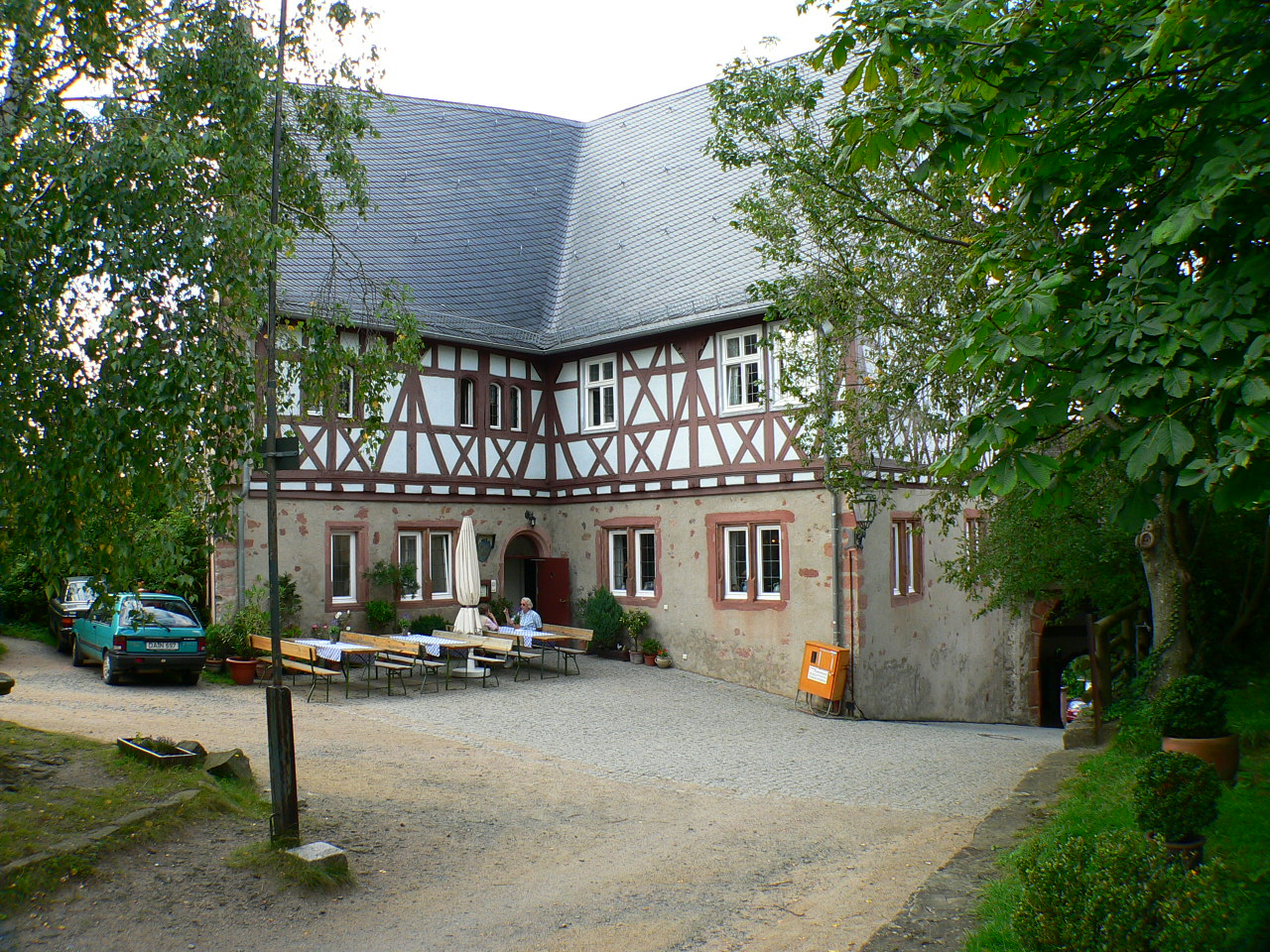
Commandant's house

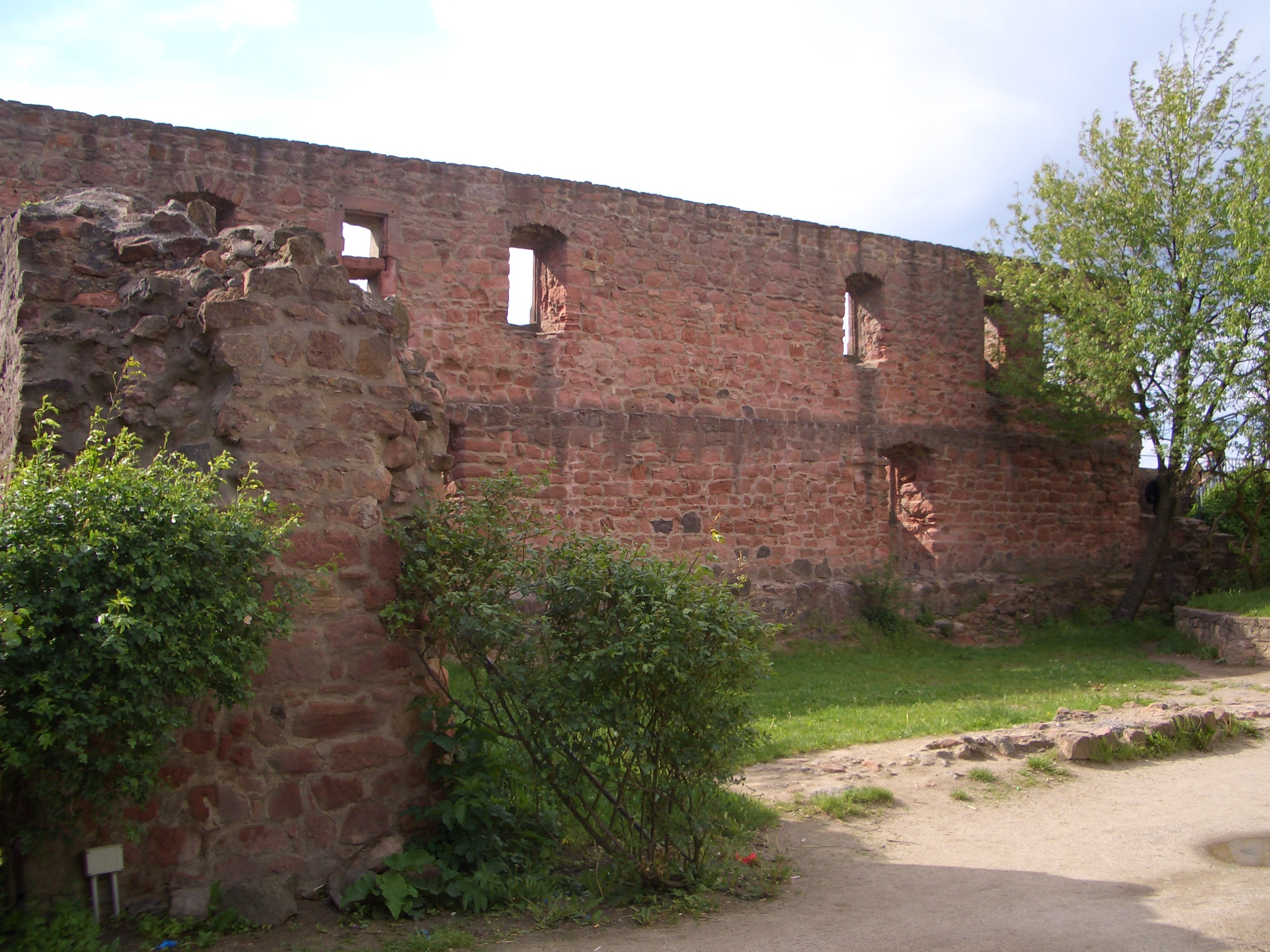
Barracks/cabinet room

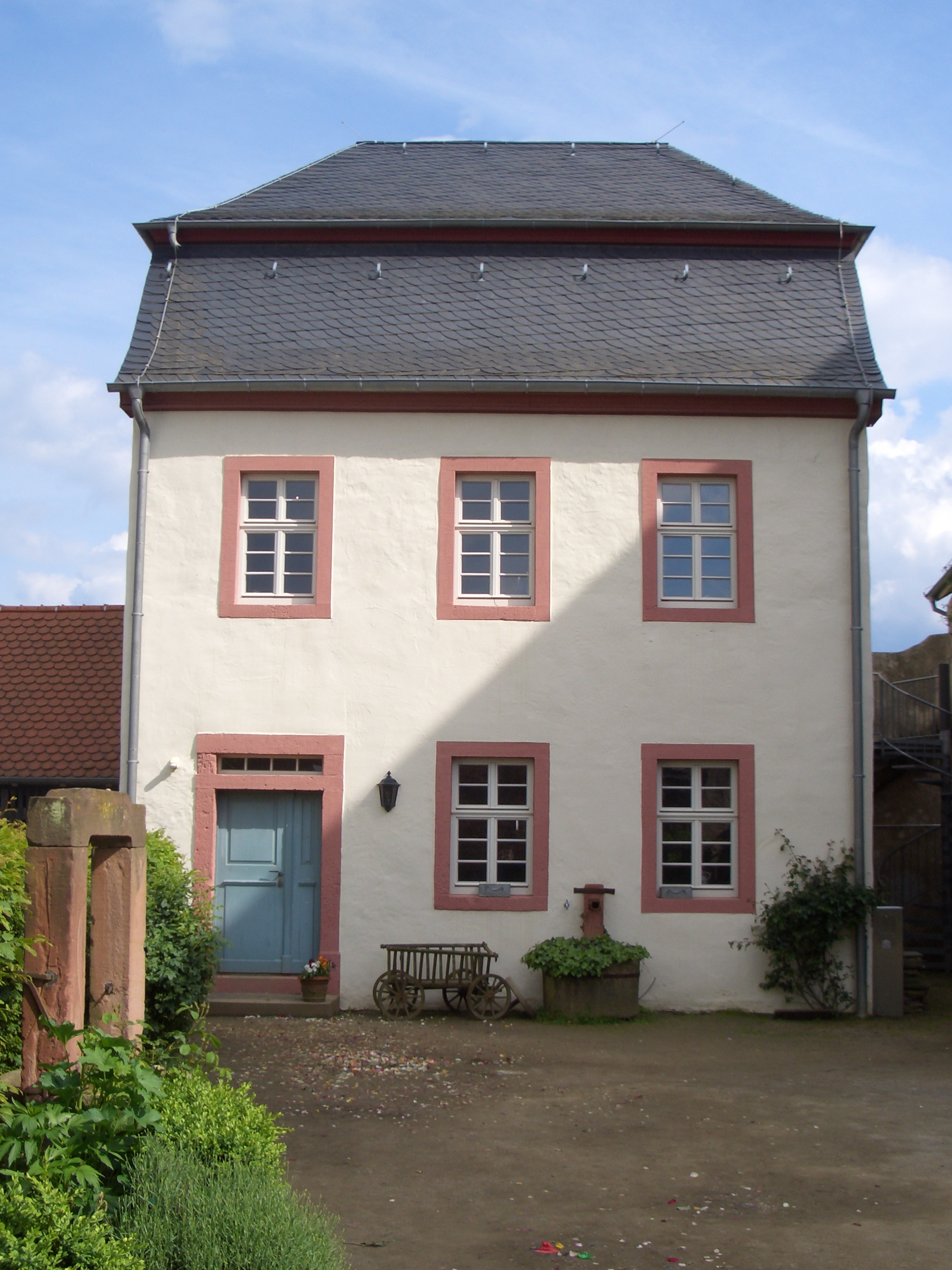
"Korporalshaus"

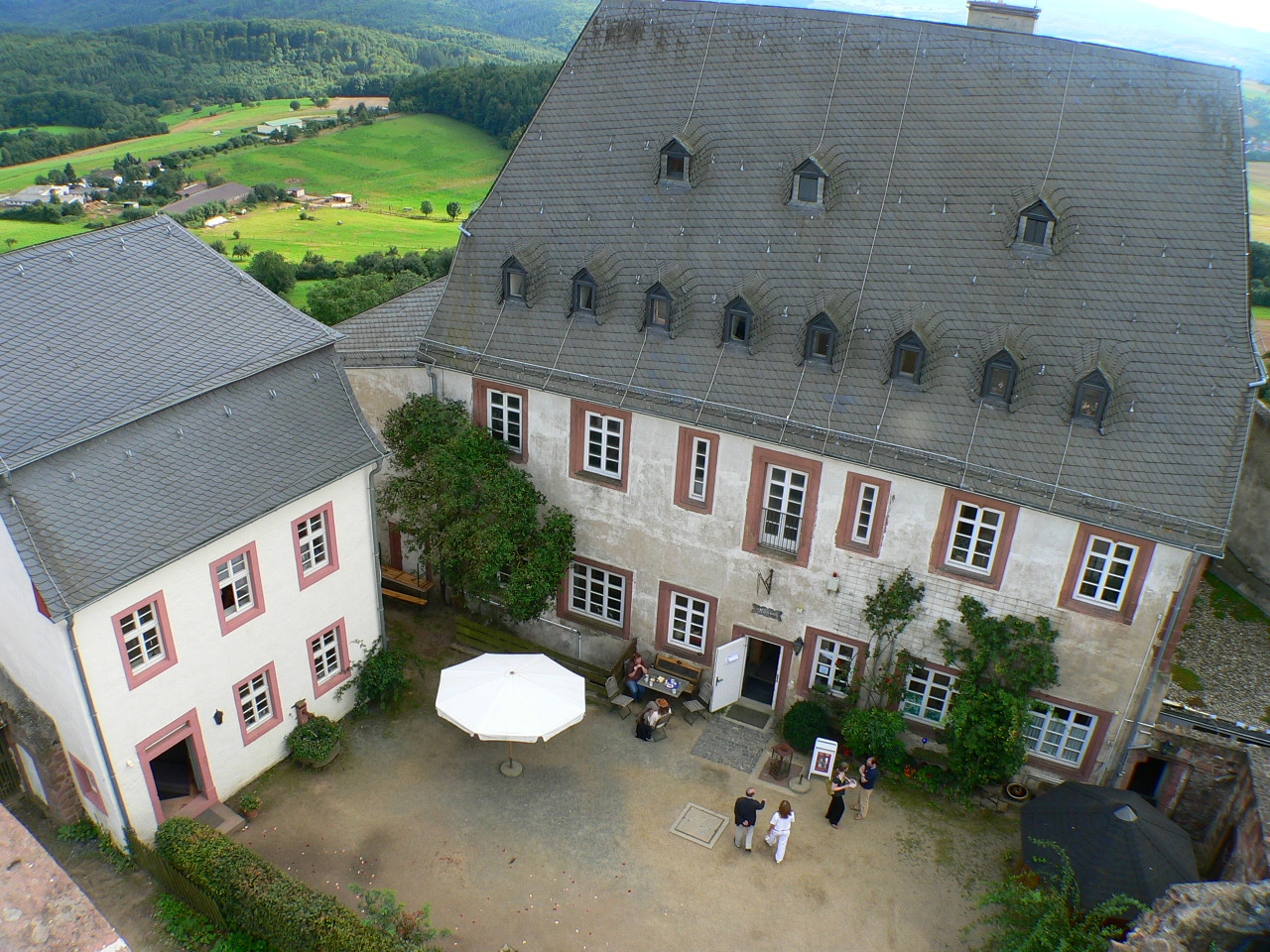
"Korporalshaus" and palas

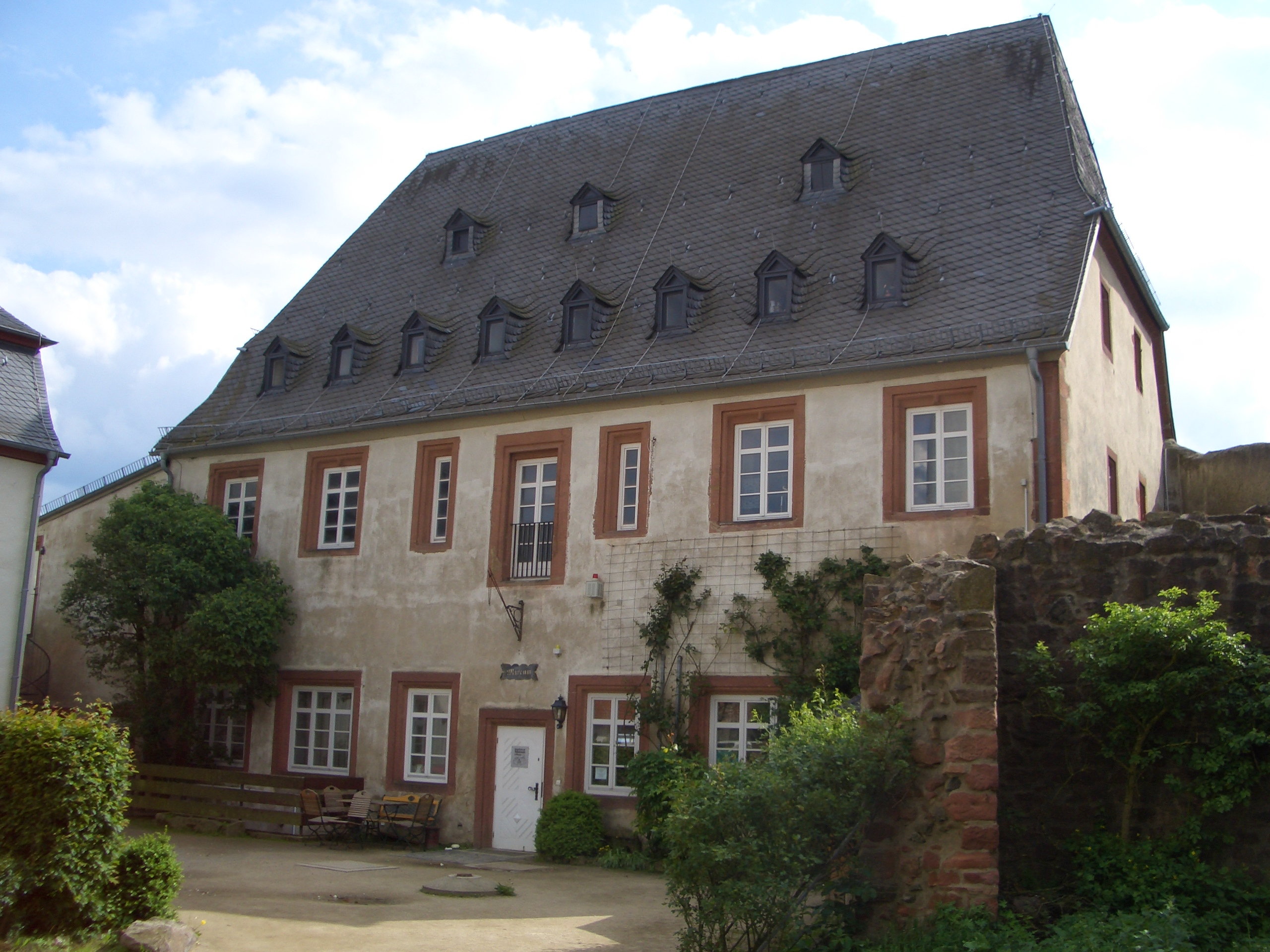
The palas

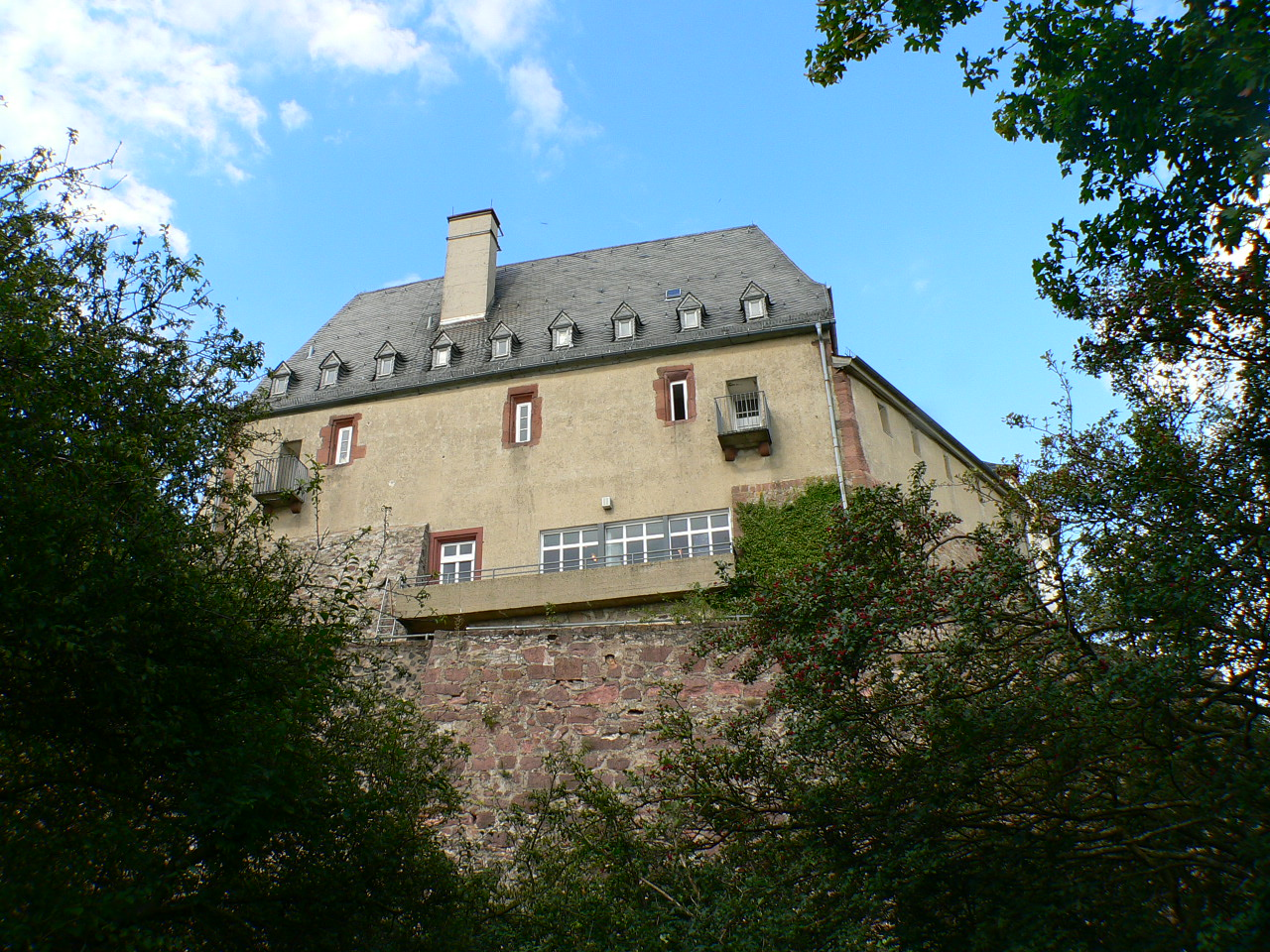
South side of the palas

== Literature ==
- Wolfram Becher: Name und Ursprung der Burg Otzberg. In: Der Odenwald. Zeitschrift des Breuberg-Bundes 26/1, 1979, pp. 3–26.
- Thomas Biller: Burgen und Schlösser im Odenwald. Ein Führer zu Geschichte und Architektur. Schnell und Steiner, Regensburg, 2005, ISBN 3-7954-1711-2, pp. 189–192.
- Thomas Steinmetz: Zur Frühgeschichte der Burg Otzberg. In: Der Odenwald. Zeitschrift des Breuberg-Bundes. 51st annual issue (2004), Heft 2, ISSN 0029-8360, pp. 43−57.
- Axel W. Gleue: Otzberg Burg-Festung-Kaserne. Otzberg, 2003.
- Rudolf Knappe: Mittelalterliche Burgen in Hessen: 800 Burgen, Burgruinen und Burgstätten. 3rd edn. Wartberg-Verlag. Gudensberg-Gleichen, 2000. ISBN 3-86134-228-6, pp. 540−542.
- Schlösser, Burgen, alte Mauern. Herausgegeben vom Hessendienst der Staatskanzlei, Wiesbaden, 1990, ISBN 3-89214-017-0, pp. 287–289.
