= List of cities in Hesse by population =

The following list sorts all cities in the German state of Hesse with a population of more than 20,000. As of May 15, 2022, 59 cities fulfill this criterion and are listed here. This list refers only to the population of individual municipalities within their defined limits, which does not include other municipalities or suburban areas within urban agglomerations.

== List ==
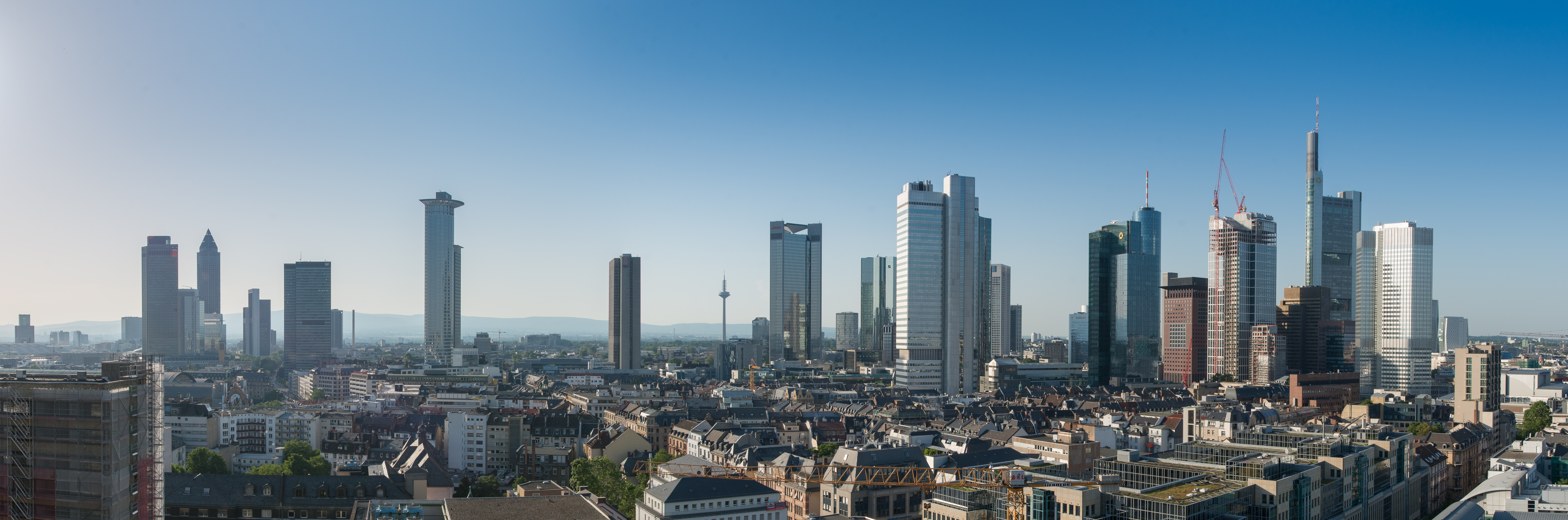
Frankfurt am Main

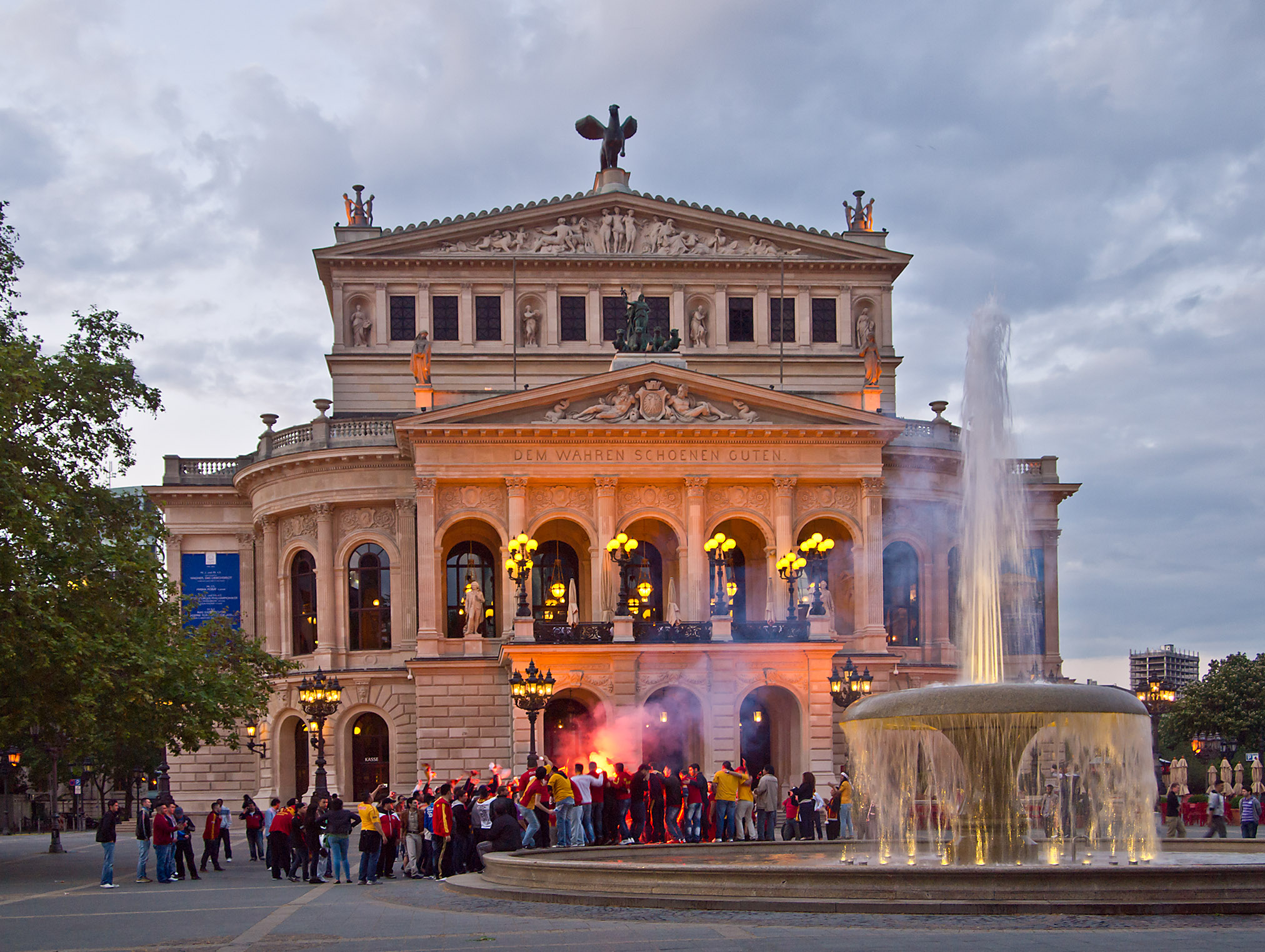
Frankfurt am Main

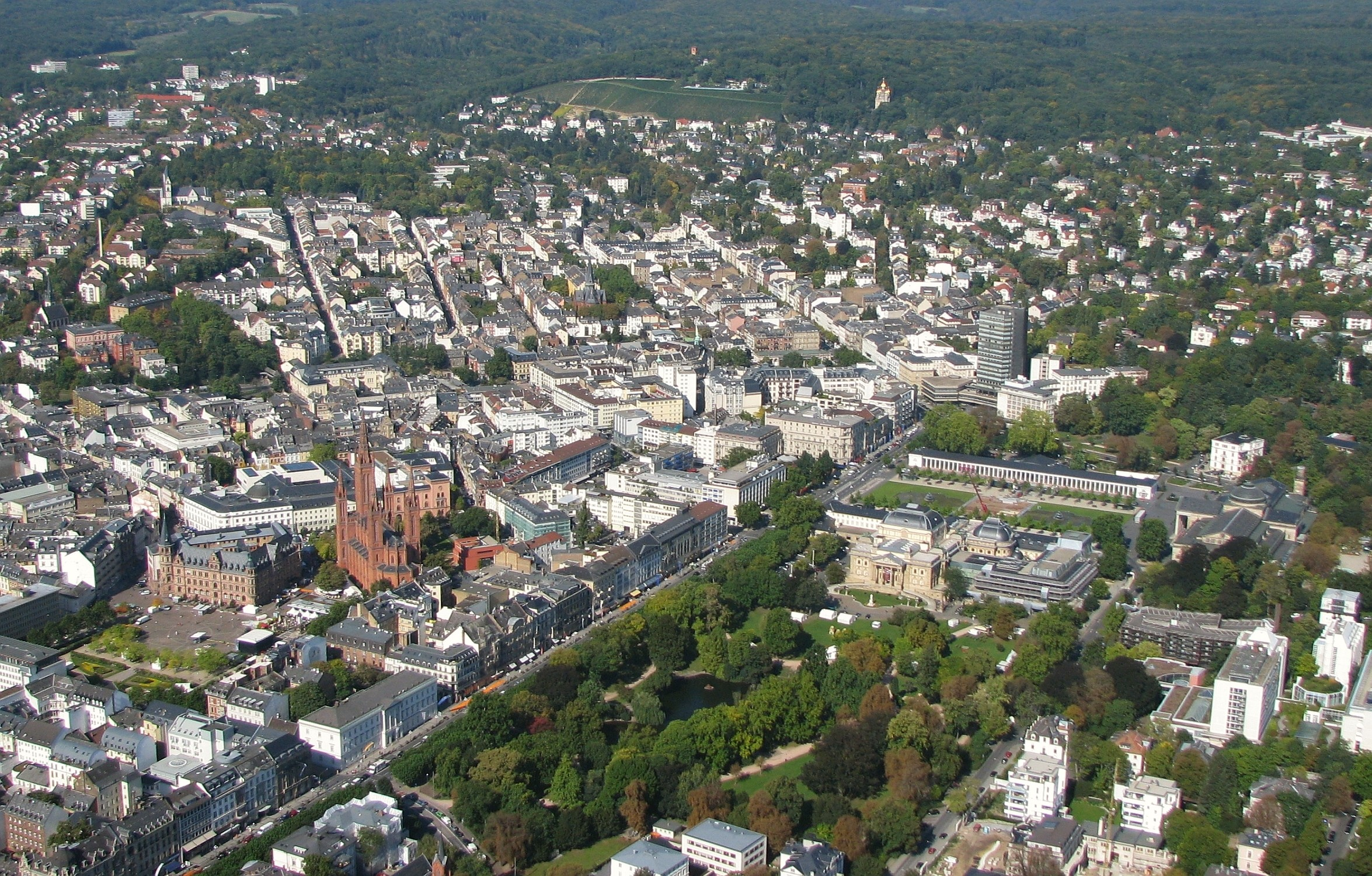
Wiesbaden

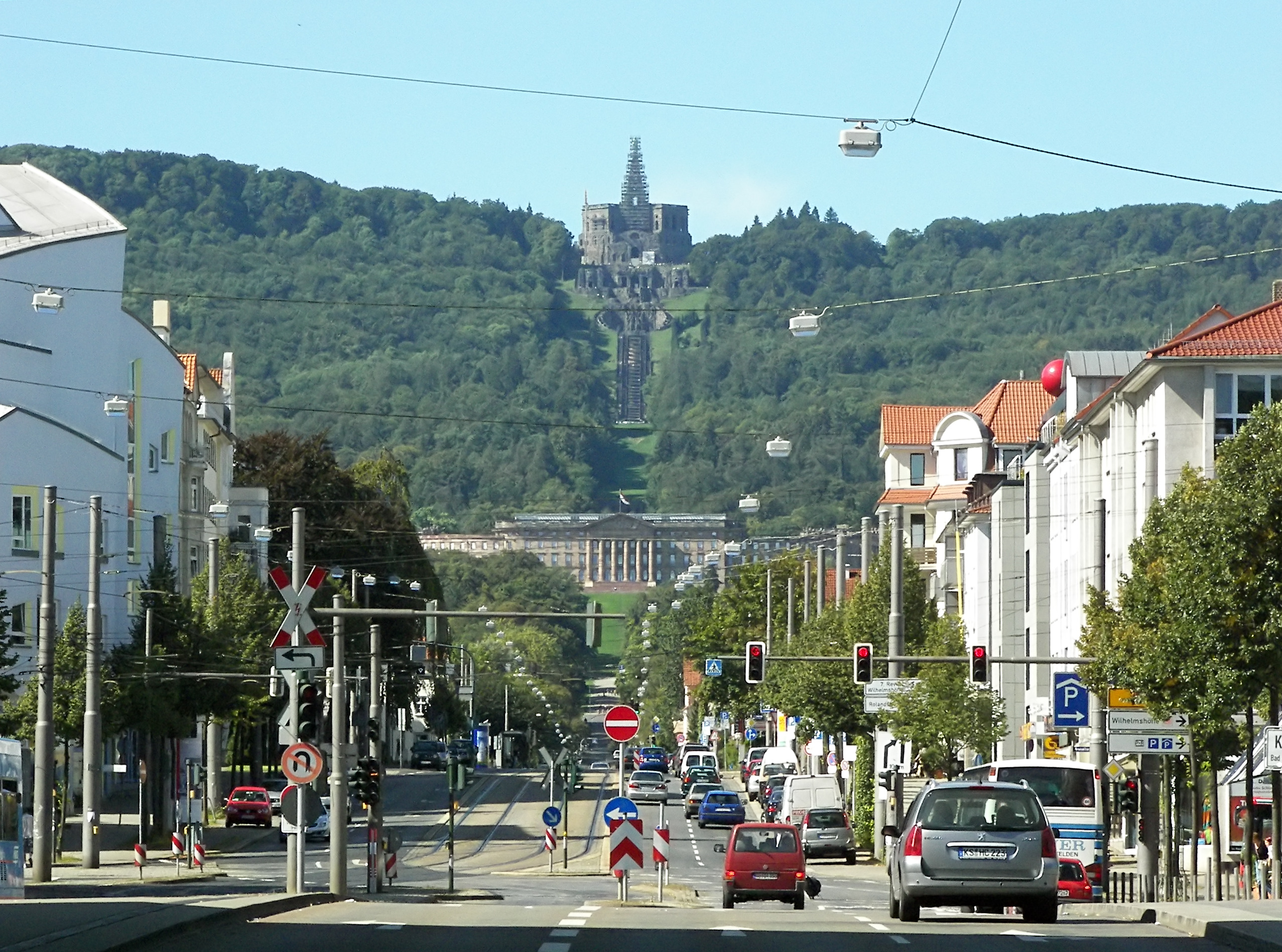
Kassel

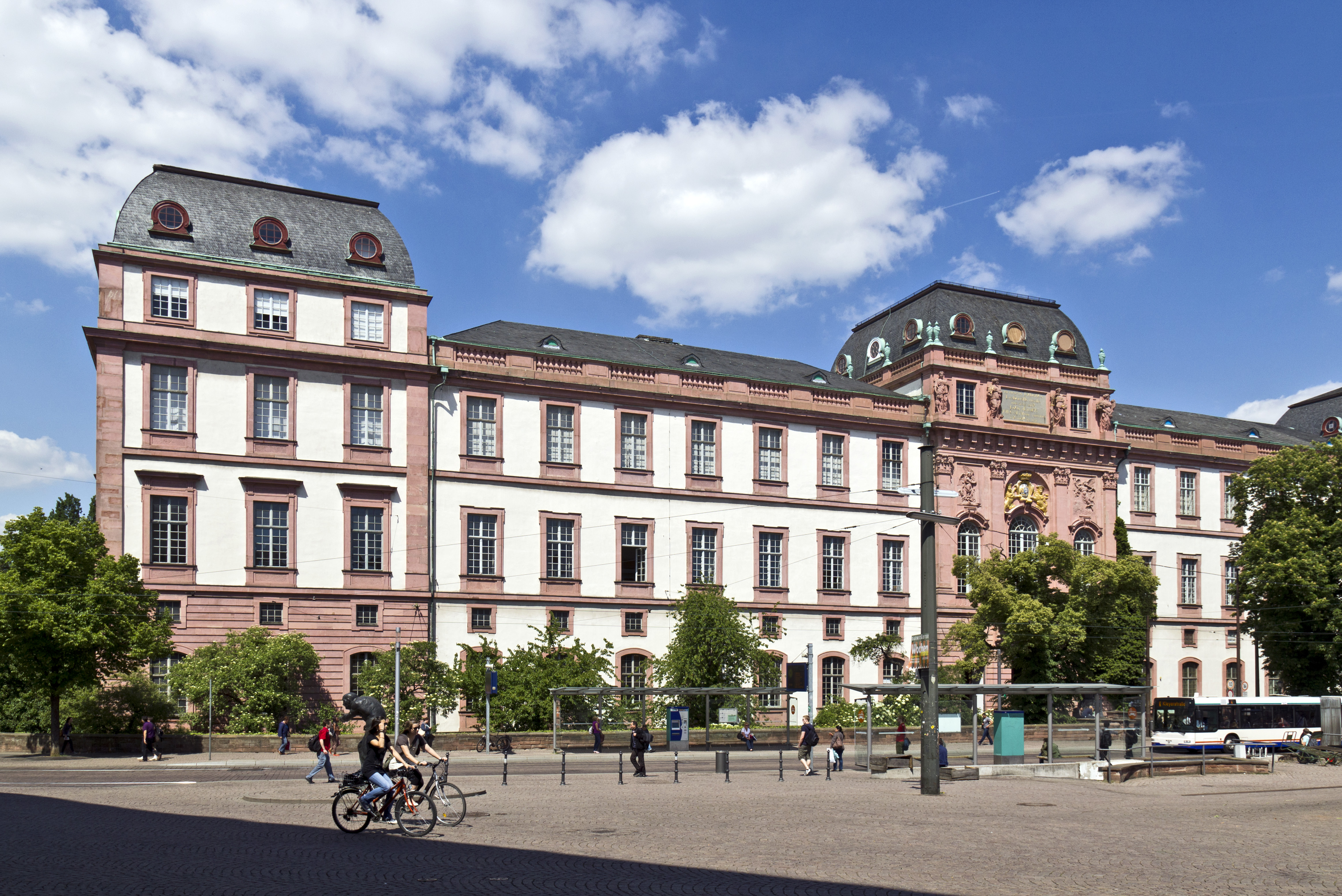
Darmstadt

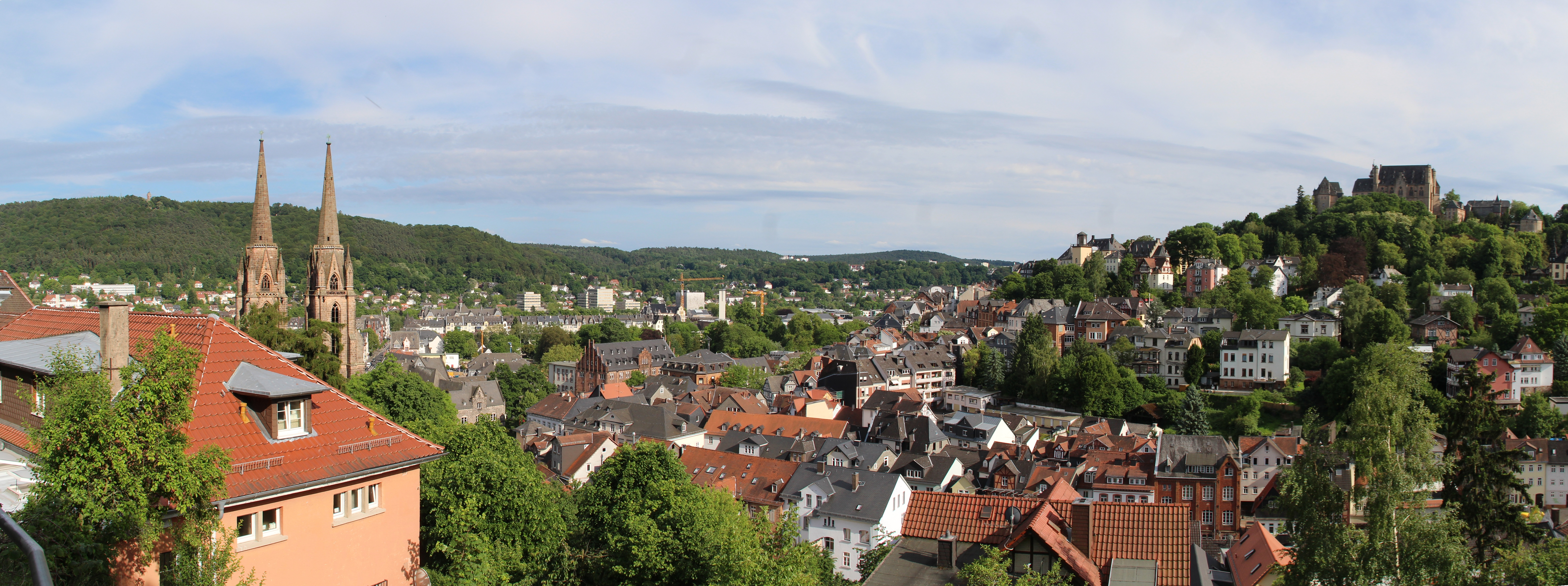
Marburg

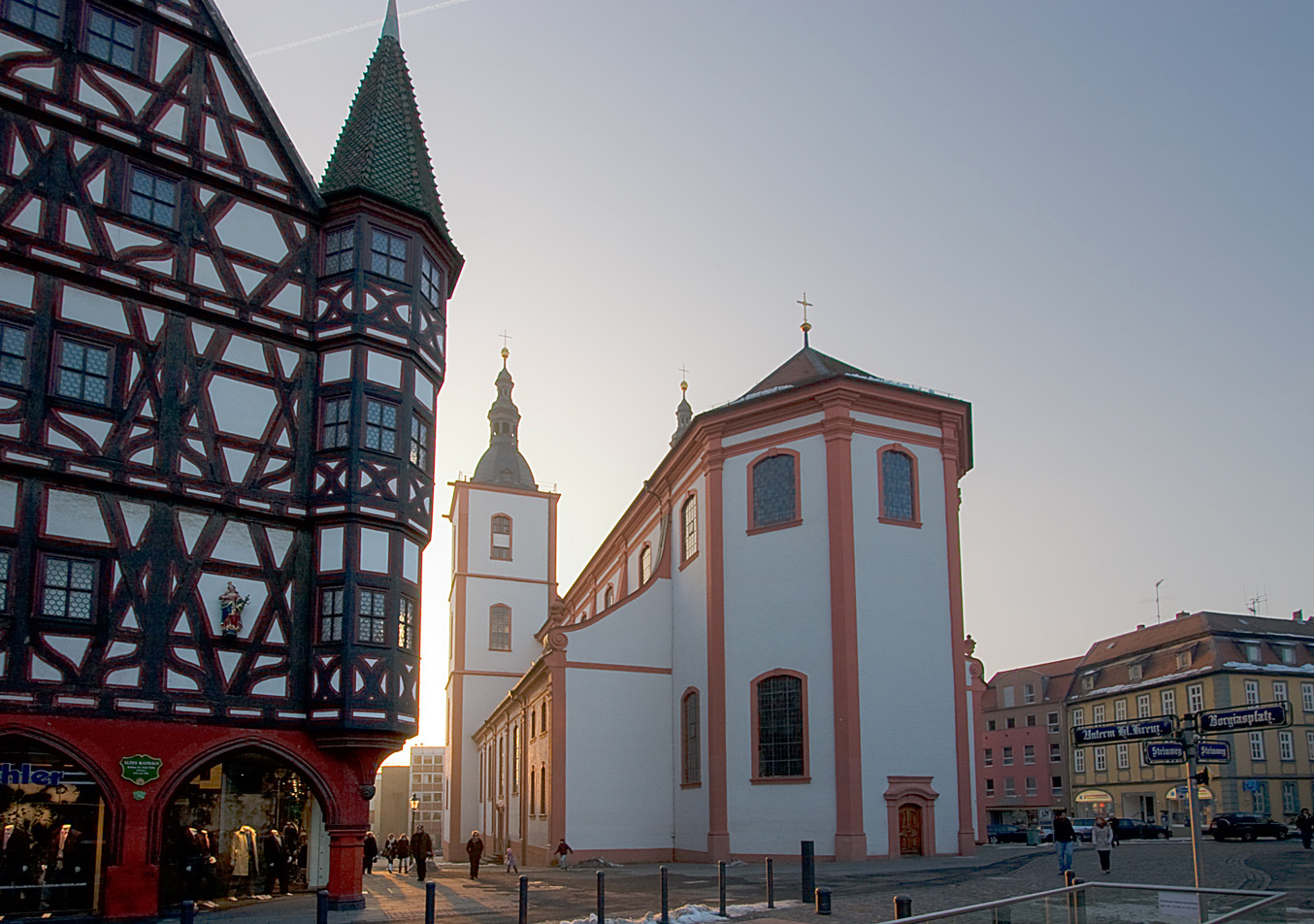
Fulda

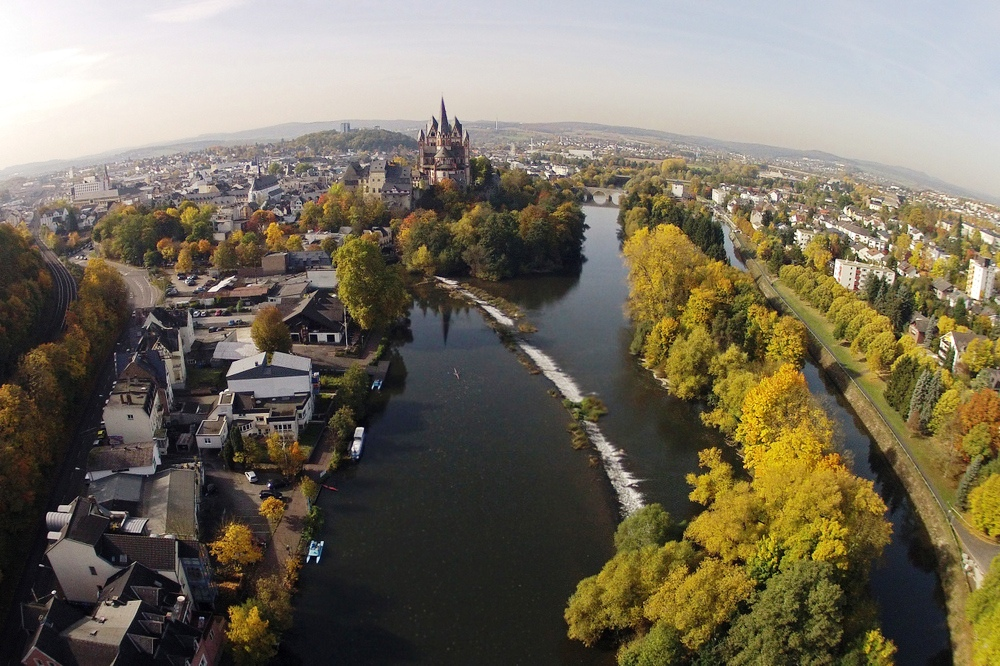
Limburg an der Lahn

The following table lists the 59 cities in Hesse with a population of at least 20,000 on May 15, 2022, as estimated by the Federal Statistical Office of Germany. A city is displayed in bold if it is a state or federal capital.

1. The city rank by population as of May 15, 2022, as enumerated by the 2022 Germany census
2. The city name
3. The name of the district (Landkreis) in which the city lies (some cities are districts on their own called urban districts)
4. The city population as of May 15, 2022, as enumerated by the 2022 Germany census
5. The city population as of May 9, 2011, as enumerated by the 2011 European Union census
6. The city land area as of May 15, 2022
7. The city population density as of May 15, 2022 (residents per unit of land area)

2022 rank	City	District	2022 census	2011 census	2022 land area	2022 pop. density
1	Frankfurt am Main	urban district	743,268	667,925	248 km^{2}	2,993/km^{2}
2	**Wiesbaden**	urban district	284,260	269,121	204 km^{2}	1,394/km^{2}
3	Kassel	urban district	195,012	190,765	107 km^{2}	1,826/km^{2}
4	Darmstadt	urban district	161,767	143,499	122 km^{2}	1,325/km^{2}
5	Offenbach am Main	urban district	129,479	113,443	44.9 km^{2}	2,885/km^{2}
6	Hanau	Main-Kinzig-Kreis	93,632	86,803	76.5 km^{2}	1,224/km^{2}
7	Giessen	Giessen (district)	87,217	74,776	72.6 km^{2}	1,201/km^{2}
8	Marburg	Marburg-Biedenkopf	72,768	71,683	124 km^{2}	587.3/km^{2}
9	Fulda	Fulda (district)	64,688	64,414	104 km^{2}	621.7/km^{2}
10	Rüsselsheim am Main	Groß-Gerau (district)	64,517	58,765	58.3 km^{2}	1,107/km^{2}
11	Bad Homburg vor der Höhe	Hochtaunuskreis	54,795	51,370	51.2 km^{2}	1,071/km^{2}
12	Wetzlar	Lahn-Dill-Kreis	53,116	50,826	75.7 km^{2}	702.1/km^{2}
13	Oberursel (Taunus)	Hochtaunuskreis	46,218	44,088	45.4 km^{2}	1,019/km^{2}
14	Rodgau	Offenbach (district)	44,501	42,919	65.0 km^{2}	684.2/km^{2}
15	Dreieich	Offenbach (district)	41,535	39,389	53.3 km^{2}	779.7/km^{2}
16	Bensheim	Bergstraße	40,993	39,253	57.8 km^{2}	708.9/km^{2}
17	Hofheim am Taunus	Main-Taunus-Kreis	39,004	37,842	57.4 km^{2}	679.2/km^{2}
18	Maintal	Main-Kinzig-Kreis	38,712	35,805	32.4 km^{2}	1,194/km^{2}
19	Langen	Offenbach (district)	37,169	34,939	29.1 km^{2}	1,276/km^{2}
20	Neu-Isenburg	Offenbach (district)	36,531	34,708	24.3 km^{2}	1,504/km^{2}
21	Limburg an der Lahn	Limburg-Weilburg	35,617	33,583	45.1 km^{2}	788.7/km^{2}
22	Dietzenbach	Offenbach (district)	35,183	31,845	21.7 km^{2}	1,623/km^{2}
23	Bad Vilbel	Wetteraukreis	34,955	31,280	25.7 km^{2}	1,361/km^{2}
24	Viernheim	Bergstraße	34,252	32,615	48.4 km^{2}	707.5/km^{2}
25	Bad Nauheim	Wetteraukreis	32,162	30,210	32.5 km^{2}	988.4/km^{2}
26	Lampertheim	Bergstraße	32,058	31,037	72.3 km^{2}	443.6/km^{2}
27	Mörfelden-Walldorf	Groß-Gerau (district)	31,804	32,380	44.1 km^{2}	720.7/km^{2}
28	Bad Hersfeld	Hersfeld-Rotenburg	30,635	28,610	73.8 km^{2}	414.7/km^{2}
29	Taunusstein	Rheingau-Taunus-Kreis	30,016	28,365	67.0 km^{2}	447.9/km^{2}
30	Friedberg	Wetteraukreis	28,719	27,337	50.2 km^{2}	572.3/km^{2}
31	Rödermark	Offenbach (district)	28,645	26,262	30.0 km^{2}	955.2/km^{2}
32	Mühlheim am Main	Offenbach (district)	28,607	26,847	20.7 km^{2}	1,384/km^{2}
33	Griesheim	Darmstadt-Dieburg	28,578	25,511	21.6 km^{2}	1,326/km^{2}
34	Kelkheim (Taunus)	Main-Taunus-Kreis	28,392	27,685	30.6 km^{2}	923.9/km^{2}
35	Hattersheim am Main	Main-Taunus-Kreis	28,016	24,773	15.8 km^{2}	1,773/km^{2}
36	Baunatal	Kassel	27,734	27,378	38.3 km^{2}	724.7/km^{2}
37	Heppenheim	Bergstraße	26,912	24,895	52.1 km^{2}	516.3/km^{2}
38	Butzbach	Wetteraukreis	26,529	23,885	107 km^{2}	248.9/km^{2}
39	Weiterstadt	Darmstadt-Dieburg	26,311	23,675	34.4 km^{2}	764.9/km^{2}
40	Idstein	Rheingau-Taunus-Kreis	25,621	23,271	79.7 km^{2}	321.2/km^{2}
41	Friedrichsdorf	Hochtaunuskreis	25,585	24,323	30.2 km^{2}	849.2/km^{2}
42	Pfungstadt	Darmstadt-Dieburg	25,474	23,829	42.5 km^{2}	598.8/km^{2}
43	Groß-Gerau	Groß-Gerau (district)	24,887	23,739	54.5 km^{2}	456.9/km^{2}
44	Obertshausen	Offenbach (district)	24,789	23,785	13.6 km^{2}	1,820/km^{2}
45	Bad Soden am Taunus	Bad Soden am Taunus	23,242	21,061	12.6 km^{2}	1,859/km^{2}
46	Dillenburg	Lahn-Dill-Kreis	23,003	23,874	83.9 km^{2}	274.6/km^{2}
47	Riedstadt	Groß-Gerau (district)	22,927	21,557	73.7 km^{2}	311.0/km^{2}
48	Gelnhausen	Main-Kinzig-Kreis	22,868	21,801	45.2 km^{2}	506.5/km^{2}
49	Korbach	Waldeck-Frankenberg	22,558	23,505	124 km^{2}	181.8/km^{2}
50	Karben	Wetteraukreis	22,361	21,149	43.9 km^{2}	508.9/km^{2}
51	Büdingen	Wetteraukreis	22,343	20,871	123 km^{2}	181.8/km^{2}
52	Eschborn	Main-Taunus-Kreis	21,663	20,364	12.1 km^{2}	1,786/km^{2}
53	Flörsheim am Main	Main-Taunus-Kreis	21,383	19,924	22.9 km^{2}	930.1/km^{2}
54	Groß-Umstadt	Darmstadt-Dieburg	21,244	20,699	86.8 km^{2}	244.6/km^{2}
55	Stadtallendorf	Marburg-Biedenkopf	21,101	20,722	78.3 km^{2}	269.7/km^{2}
56	Seligenstadt	Offenbach (district)	20,850	20,048	30.9 km^{2}	675.9/km^{2}
57	Bruchköbel	Main-Kinzig-Kreis	20,335	20,227	29.7 km^{2}	684.9/km^{2}
58	Herborn	Lahn-Dill-Kreis	20,084	20,632	63.8 km^{2}	315.0/km^{2}
59	Nidderau	Main-Kinzig-Kreis	20,055	19,853	46.7 km^{2}	429.2/km^{2}
