= Hemsberg =

Coordinates: 49°40′07″N 8°38′22″E

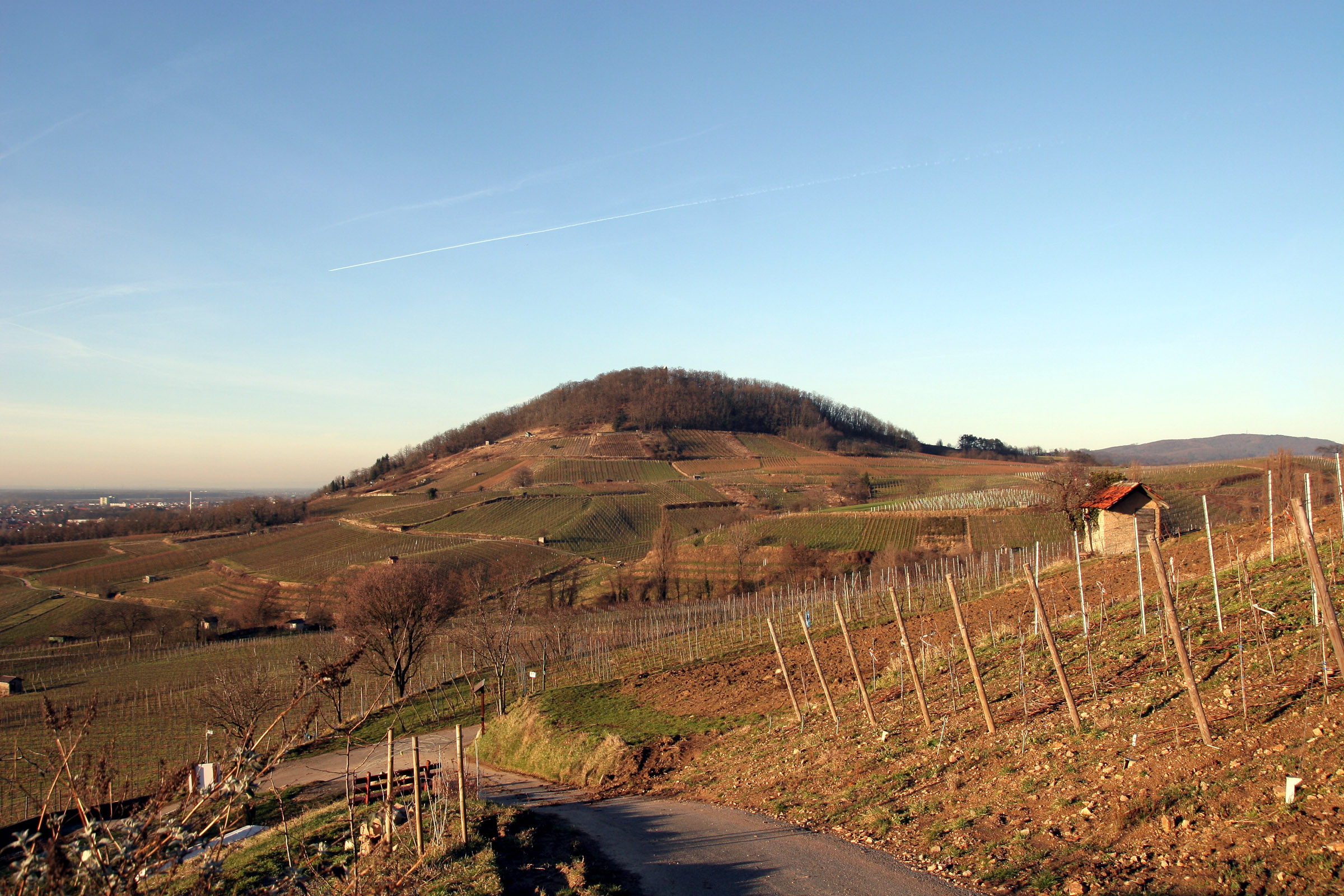
- The Hemsberg Hill

Highest point
- Elevation: 262.2 m (860 ft)

Geography
- Location: Hesse, Germany

Hemsberg is a hill in Hesse, Germany.
