= Kleiner Nickus =

Hill in Hesse, Germany

Coordinates: 50°20′N 9°42′E

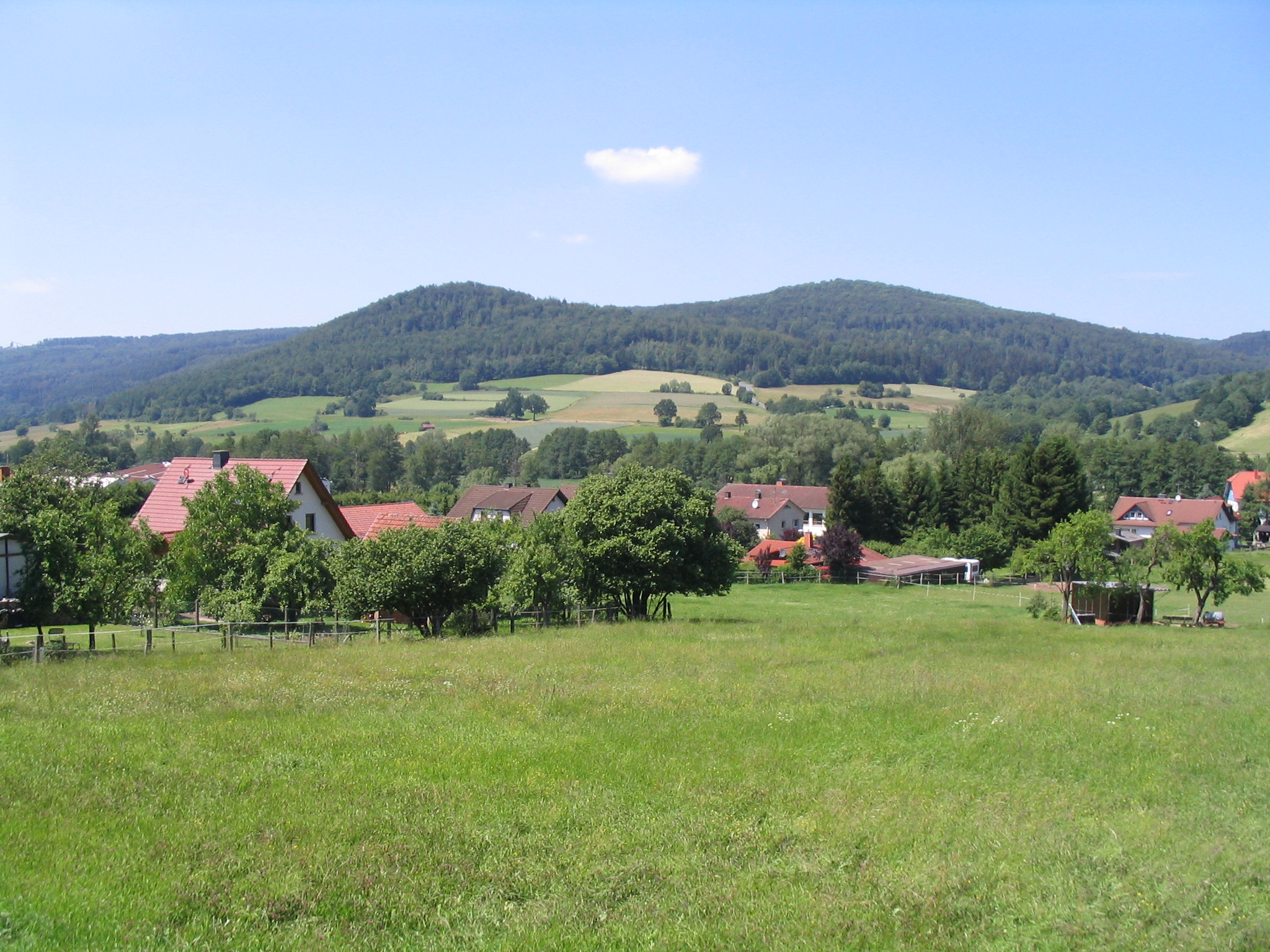
- View from Oberzell to the Kleiner (488 m) and Großer Nickus (558 m)

Highest point
- Elevation: 488 m (1,601 ft)

Geography
- Location: Hesse, Germany

The Kleiner Nickus is a hill in Hesse, Germany.
