= Hungert =

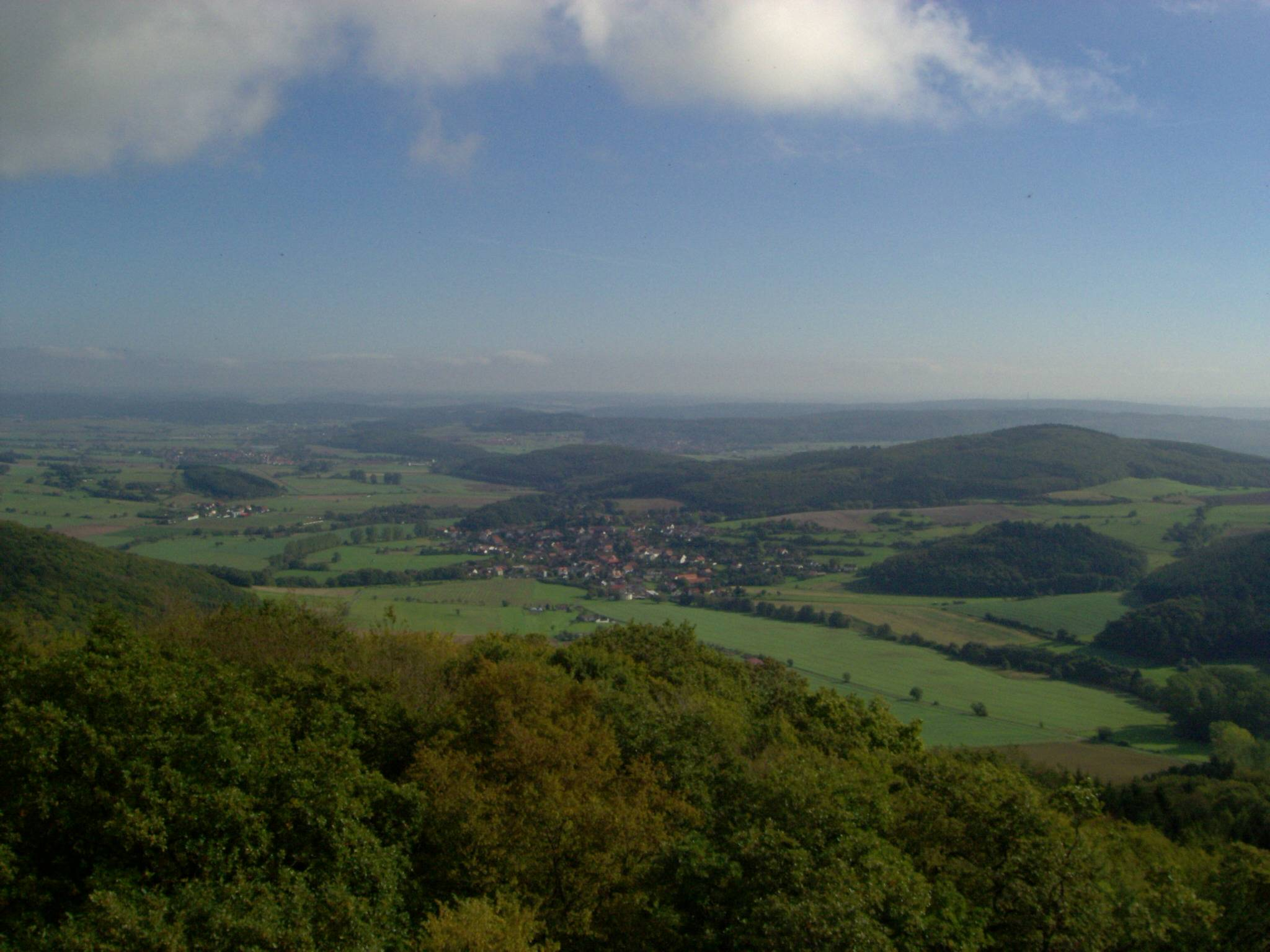
- The Hungert (right) behind Caldern

Highest point
- Elevation: 411.5 m (1,350 ft)
- Prominence: 77 m (253 ft)
- Coordinates: 50°50′9″N 8°40′21″E

Geography
- Location: Caldern, Hesse, Germany

Hungert is a hill near Caldern, Hesse, Germany.
