= Hangelstein =

Coordinates: 50°38′N 8°43′E

Highest point
- Elevation: 305 m (1,001 ft)

Geography
- Location: Hesse, Germany

Hangelstein is a hill of Hesse, Germany.
