= Naxburg =

Mountain in Hesse, Germany

Coordinates: 50°27′N 9°24′E

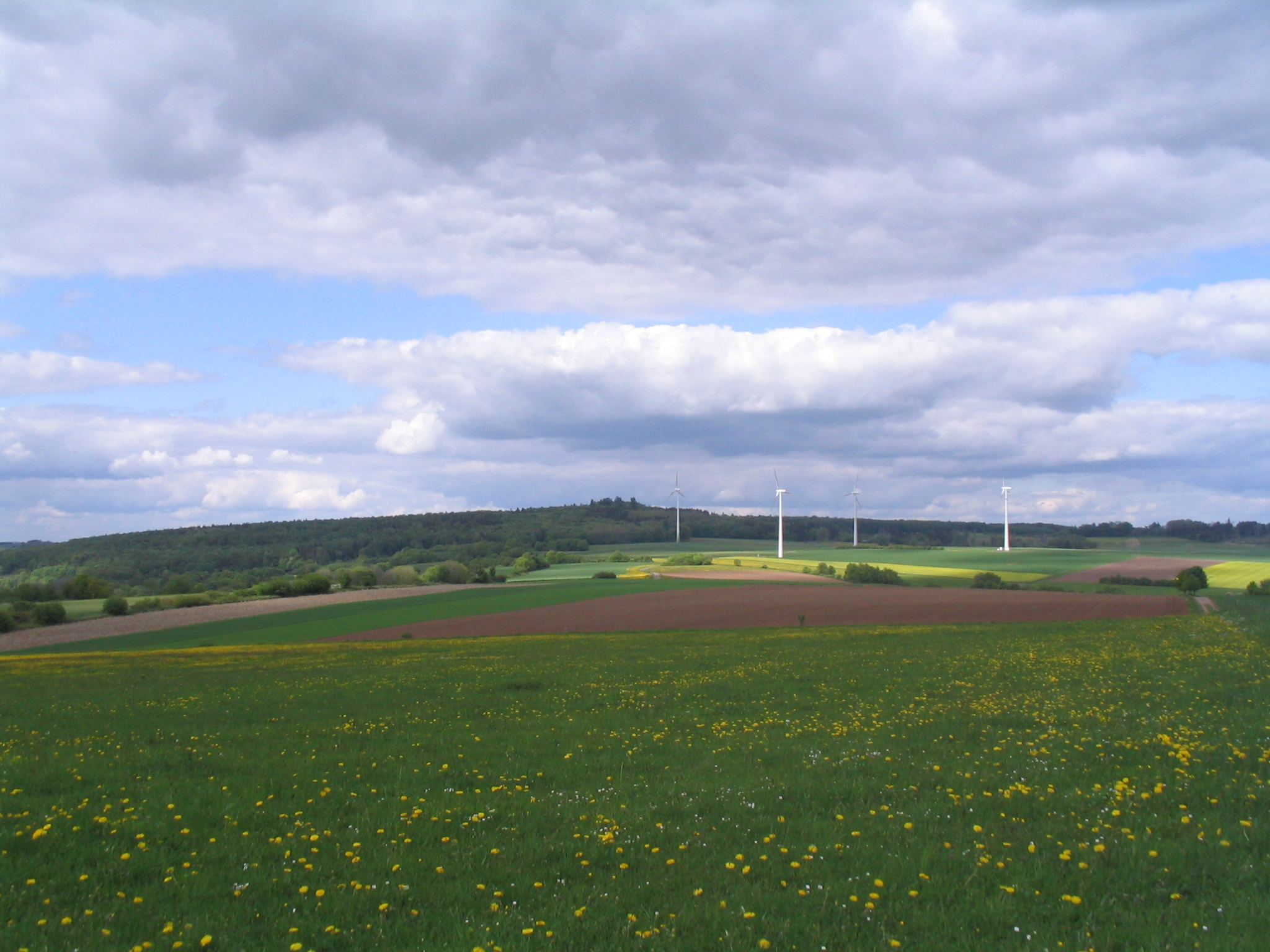
- Naxburg

Highest point
- Elevation: 554 m (1,818 ft)

Geography
- Location: Hesse, Germany

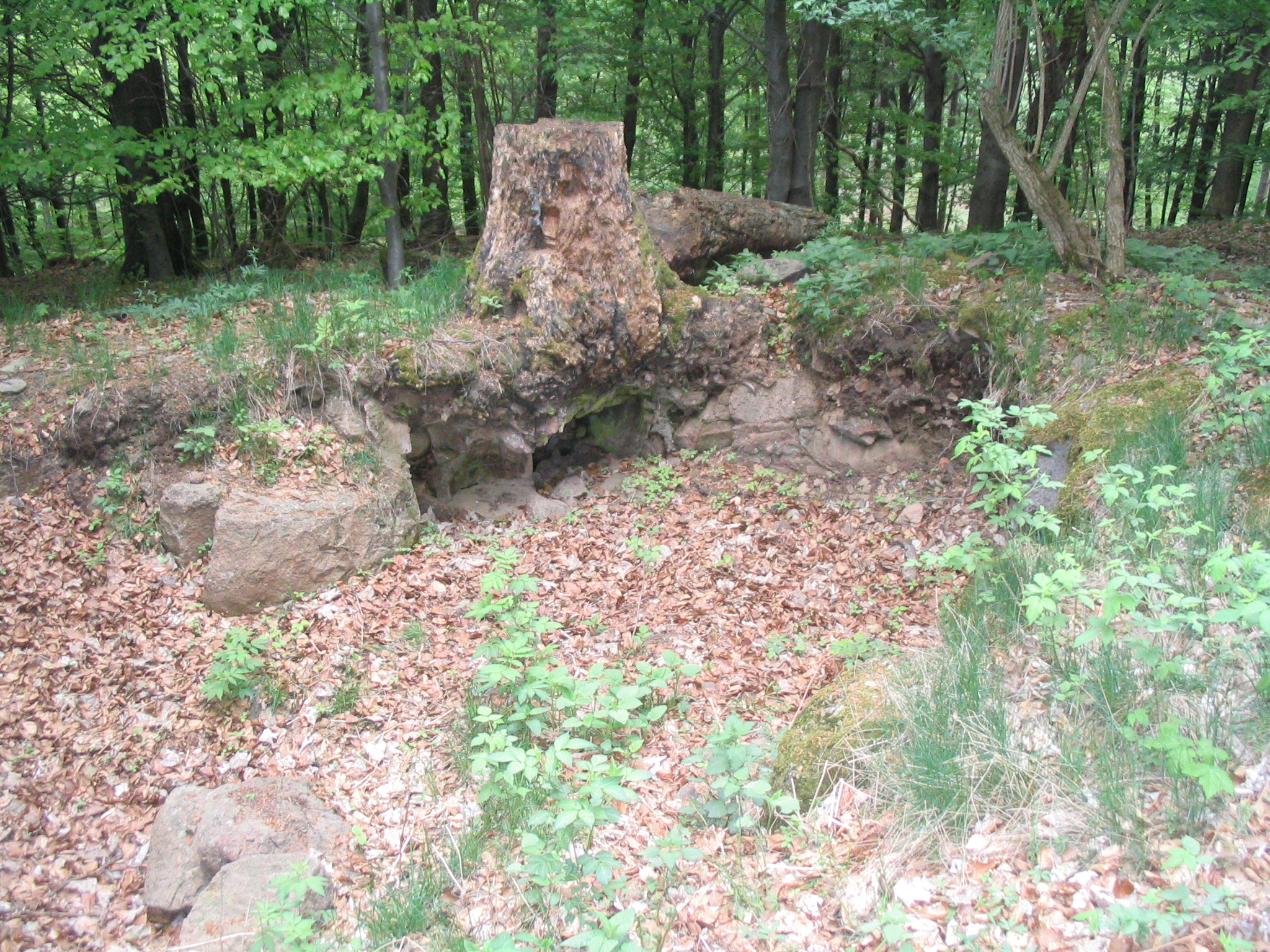
Perched atop the Naxburg hill (554 meters) near Freiensteinau in the picturesque Vogelsberg region, lies the remnants of a historic castle complex.

Naxburg is a hill of Hesse, Germany.
