= Hundsberg =

Hill in Hesse, Germany

Coordinates: 51°17′51″N 9°16′29″E

Highest point
- Elevation: 496 m (1,627 ft)

Geography
- Location: Hesse, Germany

The Hundsberg is a hill of Hesse, Germany. It is a northeastern peak of the Wattenberg massif.
