= Großer Nickus =

Coordinates: 50°21′N 9°41′E

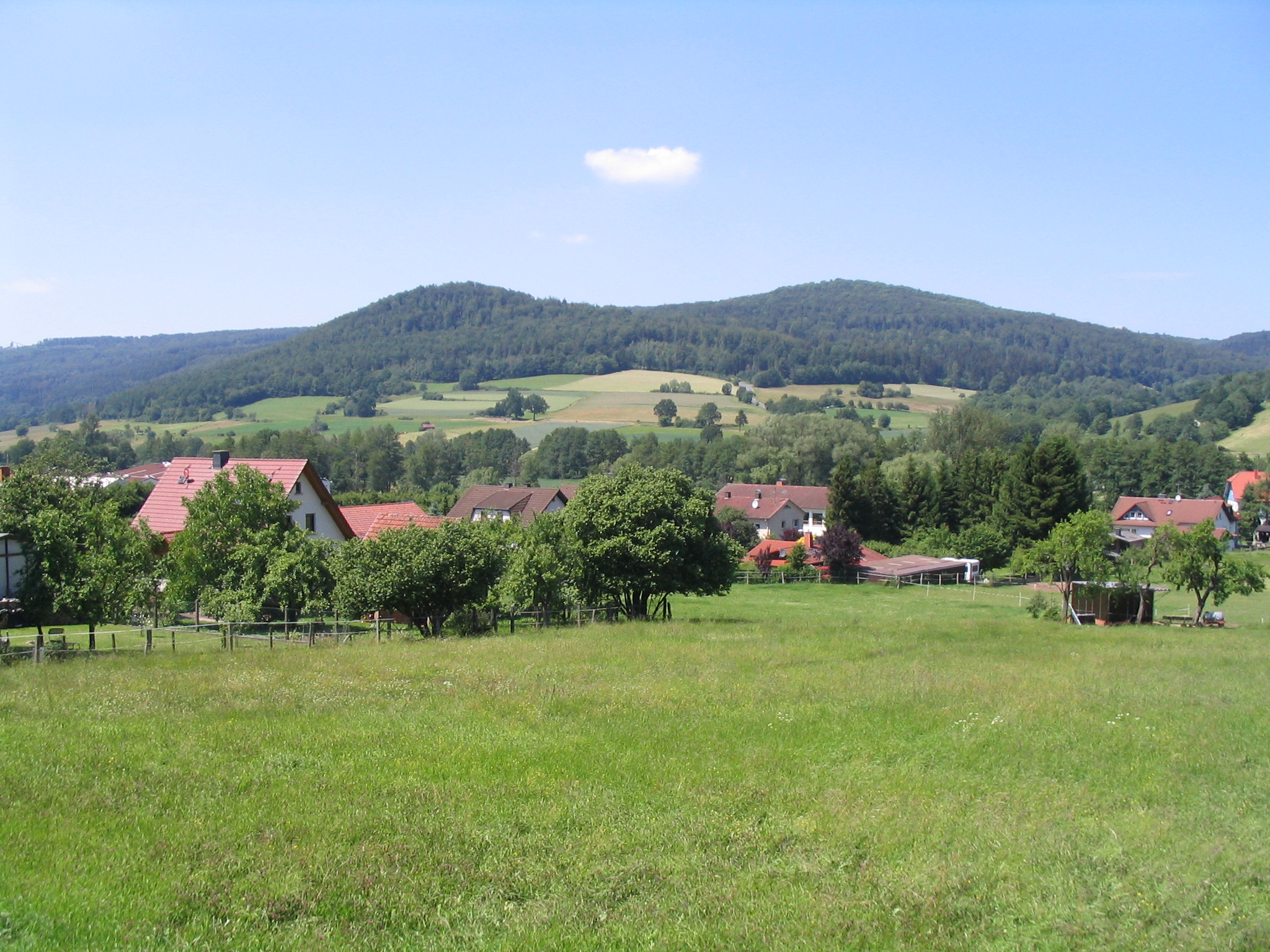
- Kleiner Nickus (left) and Großer Nickus (right)

Highest point
- Elevation: 558 m (1,831 ft)

Geography
- Location: Hesse, Germany

The Großer Nickus is a hill in Hesse, Germany.
