= Elzer Berg =

Coordinates: 50°24′41″N 7°58′23″E

Highest point
- Elevation: 291 m (955 ft)

Geography
- Location: Hesse, Germany

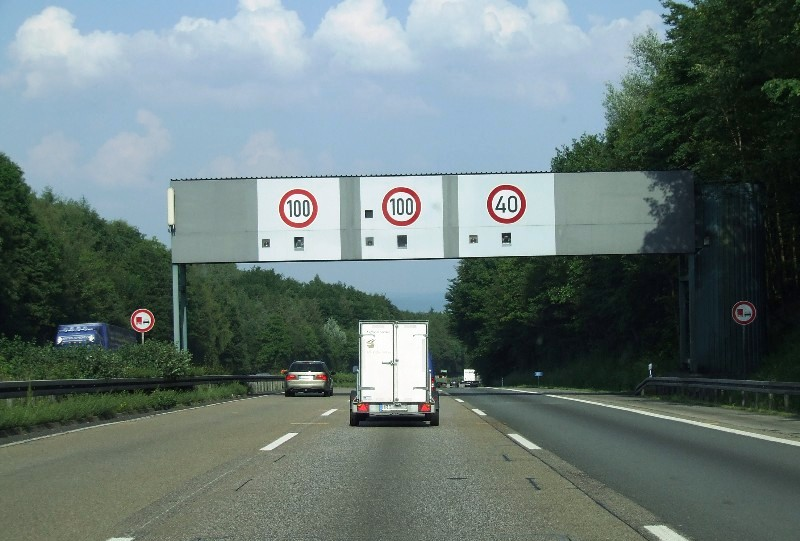
Stationary speed cameras at Elzer Berg (until 2009, the outer lane was limited to 40 km/h)

The Elzer Berg is a hill in Hesse, Germany. The Autobahn A3 crosses the hill. Its downhill slope facing Limburg is known for

its speed limit that is rigorously enforced with cameras mounted in the sign gantries.

A tunnel of the high speed train track from Cologne to Frankfurt runs under the hill as well.

Also a wind farm which includes six wind turbines has been constructed beside the Elzer Berg.
