= Otzberg (volcano) =

Mountain in Germany

Coordinates: 49°49′N 8°55′E

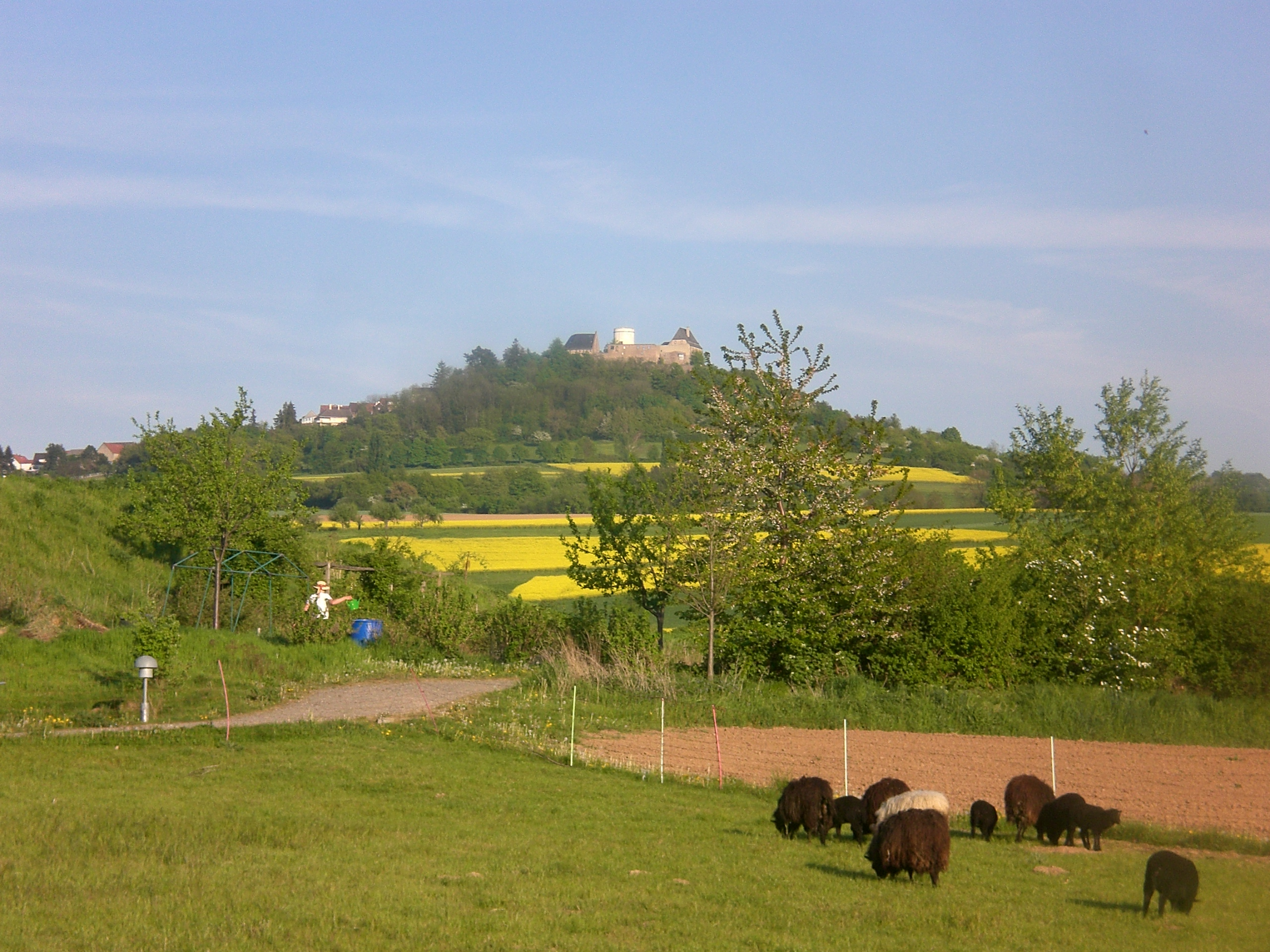
- Distant view of Mount Otzberg in southern Hesse, Germany

Highest point
- Elevation: 367 m (1,204 ft)

Geography
- Location: Hesse, Germany

Otzberg is a hill and extinct volcano in Hesse, Germany.
