= Helfenstein (Habichtswald) =

Coordinates: 51°22′N 9°21′E

Highest point
- Elevation: 578.7 m (1,899 ft)

Geography
- Location: Hesse, Germany

Helfenstein is a hill of Hesse, Germany.
