= Helm of Cannae =

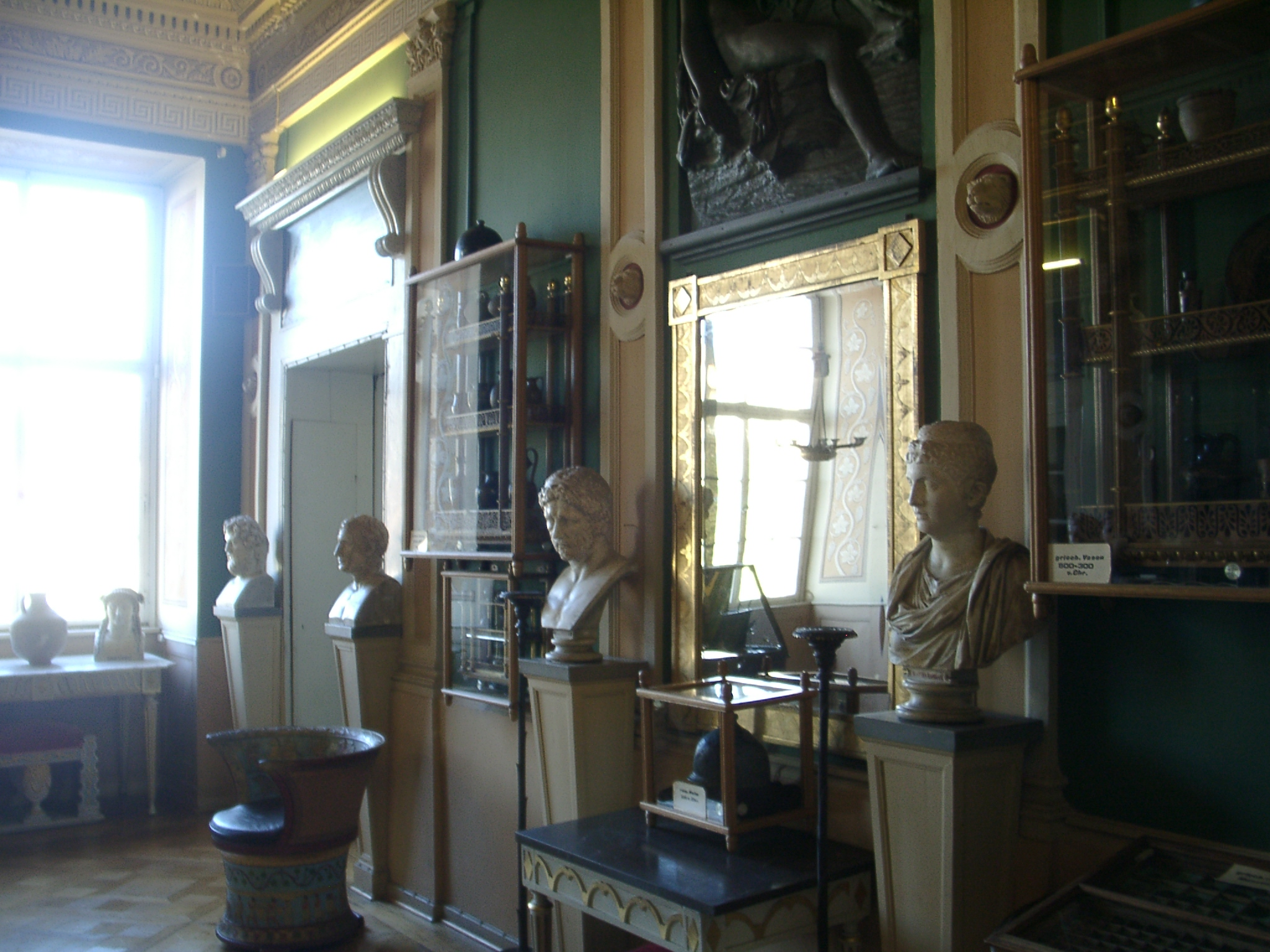
The Roman antiquities chamber of Erbach Palace. The Helm is located in the vitrine under the mirror.

The Helm of Cannae is an artefact in the antiquities collection of Franz, Count of Erbach-Erbach, at Erbach Palace in Erbach im Odenwald. It is, reputedly, one of the few surviving helmets from the field of the Battle between the Roman Republic and the Carthaginians under Hannibal in 216 BC. It is most famous for a legend about its acquisition by the count.

Legend has it that the helm was stolen from the Vatican Museum by a member of Count Franz I's staff at his direction during his second tour of Italy in 1791. The story of the preparation and commission of this theft was dealt with repeatedly and partially dramatised in nineteenth century literature. The earliest surviving written source is an account by Otto Müller, which was produced before 1868.

The servant who is said to have committed the theft was Friedrich Louis (1759–1846), who later became a forester and great-grandfather of the author Ludwig Ganghofer. He had other descendants too, including Elly Heuss-Knapp, wife of Theodor Heuss, the first President of Germany.

In serious literature about Count Franz, on the other hand, nothing is said about this event and how he acquired the famous helm is not mentioned at all. It is assumed therefore that the story is a Jägerlatein (a cock and bull story), which was recorded by Otto Müller and handed down as local tradition, perhaps based on an actual story told by Forester Friedrich Louis. The story of the Adlerstein of Würzberg is probably also derived from Louis.

== Bibliography ==
- Ernst Franz. Forstrat Louis. 2nd Edition. 1959.
- Otto Müller. Der Helm von Cannä.
