= Hesselbach Roman Fort =

Ancient Roman fort and archaeological site in Hesse, Germany

Hesselbach Fort
- Kastell Hesselbach (German)
- Interactive map of Hesselbach Fort
- 49°34′34.5″N 9°5′26″E
- Type: Numerus fort
- Periods: Trajanic up to 159/161 (max. 165)
- Location: Hesselbach
- Region: Germania Superior
- Part of: Neckar-Odenwald Limes

Site notes
- Elevation: 489 m (1,604 ft)
- Area: 80 m × 73 m (262 ft × 240 ft)
- Architectural styles: a) Wood and earth b) Dry stone c) Mortar masonry
- Condition: Traces still visible

Hesselbach Fort was a Roman numerus fort along the older Odenwald Line of the Neckar-Odenwald Limes. This archaeological site is located in Hesselbach, a district of the town of Oberzent in the Odenwaldkreis, Hesse, Germany. It is the most thoroughly studied military installation of the Odenwald Limes and the southernmost Roman fort in Hesse. Hesselbach Fort serves as a reference point for nearly all other forts along the Odenwald Limes, with insights gained here applied in Roman provincial archaeology to interpret the entire Limes section between the rivers Main and Neckar.

== Location ==
Hesselbach Fort is situated on the northeastern edge of Hesselbach village, on an open meadow not covered by modern buildings, near the Hessian-Bavarian border. Modern roads run along its praetorial front (front) and flanks, while the decuman side (rear) borders a farm's courtyard and pasture. The fort's perimeter is clearly visible in the terrain.

Topographically, the fort lies at 489 m above sea level on a plateau atop a ridge extending from the Mümling River's confluence near Obernburg southeast to the area around fort Schloßau. The nutrient-poor Buntsandstein soils and harsh climate of this plateau were not ideal for settlement. However, the ridge, running parallel to the Mümling at a consistent elevation, likely made it a strategic choice for a border line. No pre-Roman finds have been recorded in the area, and Roman artefacts suggest a primarily military use, with minimal, if any, short-lived civilian activity after the fort's abandonment.

== Research History and Significance ==
Kastell Hesselbach was first briefly mentioned in 1768 by Christian Ernst Hansselmann (1699–1776). A more detailed account followed half a century later by Johann Friedrich Knapp (1776–1848), who studied the Odenwald Limes for Count Franz I. of Erbach-Erbach (1754–1823). The Hessian Limes Commission likely conducted only superficial surveys, questioning whether the site was a fort due to limited evidence of solid masonry. (Note: Before the establishment of the Imperial Limes Commission, regional efforts to document Roman remains existed. State Limes commissions were formed in the Kingdom of Württemberg (1877) and the Grand Duchies of Hesse and Baden (1880), successfully tracing Limes routes in several areas.) In 1895, the Imperial Limes Commission, led by Friedrich Kofler (1830–1910), excavated the site, publishing results in 1896.

In 1961, provincial Roman archaeologist Dietwulf Baatz (1928–2021) studied Roman gate structures at the Tripolitanian Fort Gholaia, applying his observations to reconstruct Hesselbach’s gate buildings. Baatz later led extensive excavations at Hesselbach from 1966 to 1968, using advanced methods under the Saalburg Museum’s auspices. These excavations and the resulting publication were groundbreaking for Odenwald Limes research. Hesselbach is now considered the best-researched numerus fort of the Odenwald Line, particularly due to the comprehensive documentation of its internal structures, which serve as a model for reconstructing other Odenwald numerus forts.

== Archaeological Evidence ==
While the Reichs-Limeskommission’s late 19th-century excavations focused on the fort’s perimeter (limited by contemporary field archaeology techniques), the 1960s excavations prioritised the interior. Both campaigns identified multiple construction phases. Due to the lack of a clear stratigraphic link between perimeter and internal phases, distinct designations were used. However, correlations between these phases are supported by finds and their distribution.

Temporal correlations between the construction phases of the perimeter and the interior structures:
Perimeter	Interior	from	to
Perimeter A	Period 1	trajanic	115–130
Perimeter B	Period 2	115–130	around 145
Perimeter C	Period 2a	around 145	148–161 (154–161 ?)
Partially destroyed perimeter C	Period 3 (post- fort period)	148–161 (154–161 ?)	165 at the latest

=== Fort Perimeter ===
The fort’s perimeter enclosed approximately 0.6 hectares and remained consistent in shape across all phases, with successive walls built nearly atop one another. The Porta praetoria (main gate) faced the Limes, approximately 150 metres east. The Porta principalis dextra (right side gate) had the widest passage, suggesting it was the primary entrance. The perimeter’s contours are visible in the unbuilt meadow, with modern paths encircling the fort. An information board stands at the northern end.

==== Perimeter A ====
Constructed during the Trajanic period, Perimeter A was built in timber and soil with a wooden palisade stabilised by an earth rampart and timber posts on the inside, which supported a simple walkway. A fossa Punica (Punic ditch) with a steeper outer slope lay beyond a narrow berm. The fort had three gates: the Porta praetoria, Porta principalis dextra, and Porta principalis sinistra (left side gate), each flanked by wooden towers supported by six posts. No Porta decumana (rear gate), postern gate, or corner towers were identified.

==== Perimeter B ====
During the Hadrianic period (115–130), Perimeter B replaced the palisade with a double dry stone wall, measuring 5.0 m (northeast) to 6.9 m (southwest) in width. It consisted of outer and inner shells of unhewn Buntsandstein, filled with earth and timber, supporting, facing the Limes, a walkway possibly paved with planks and a breastwork. The fossa Punica continued but had silted up. The wooden gate structures remained unchanged, with three gates and a drainage channel for a latrine in the retentura (rear camp area), where no Porta decumana was identified at this stage.

==== Perimeter C ====
Between 140 and 150 CE, Perimeter C introduced a mortared wall built mostly in front of Perimeter B’s outer face, with an earth rampart behind. The foundation, 80 cm deep, was 1.0–1.2 m wide, with a 95 cm thick wall of Buntsandstein bonded with lime mortar from nearby Muschelkalk. The inner face used small stones, the outer larger blocks, likely topped with merlons. White plaster with red false joints is assumed but not preserved. It was probably completely eroded in the acidic soil of Hesselbach, but can be assumed with a fair degree of certainty to be analogous to other forts and watchtowers.

A new ditch, 6 m wide and 1.5 m deep, replaced the silted one, separated by a 60–80 cm berm. The gates were rebuilt, adding a 1.25 m wide rear postern gate. The three main gates had twin towers, likely with covered gatehouses. The Porta principalis dextra passage was 3.4 m, the others 3 m. The postern gate, possibly with a wooden bridge, was secured with a bar and was 1.25 m wide. No corner towers existed, but rounded corners featured risalti. This peculiarity of the wall construction, which cannot really be explained, can also be found at the Oberscheidental fort.

=== Internal Structures ===
The fort’s internal buildings included the principia (headquarters), four barracks with contubernia (soldiers’ quarters), the praetorium (commander’s residence), and storage and stable facilities. The principia indicates an independent numerus unit of about 160 men. The praetentura (front camp area) housed stables and stores, the principia occupied the centre, and the retentura contained the praetorium and barracks. All structures were wooden, identified by postholes and trenches.

==== Period 1 ====
The principia (Building 5), including its portico, covered approximately little less than 200 square metres. Entry was via a 4.2–4.4 × 10.7 m portico opening to the via praetoria (front main street). It led to a courtyard flanked by porticoes, a basilica (cross-hall), and a three-room block with the central aedes principiorum (shrine of the standards).

The praetorium (Building 6) in the retentura measured 10.5 × 15.0 m, with an entrance facing the principia. It likely had six rooms and a possible latrine, with a hearth indicating heating.

Four barracks (Buildings 1–4) flanked the principia and praetorium, each 34.6–34.8 × 4.55 m with nine rooms (c. 15.5 m²). Each contubernium likely housed 4–5 soldiers, suggesting a fort strength of 130–140 men.

In the praetentura, Building 7 (southeast) was a storage facility, possibly including armamentaria (armouries). Buildings 8 and 9 (northwest) were likely stables, with a possible group of ovens nearby.

All buildings of period 1 were constructed in timber. No evidence of repairs or destruction could be found at any point; the buildings were apparently taken down according to plan before they fell into disrepair to make room for the construction of new buildings.

==== Period 2 ====
Period 2 mirrored Period 1’s layout but used sturdier posts. The principia (Building 5) had a larger portico (6.3–6.4 × 14.3 m) and a cistern in the basilica. The praetorium (Building 6) was a corridor house with three rooms per side, most with hearths.

Four barracks (Buildings 1–4) included porticoes and officer’s quarters. Barrack 4 (7.30–7.45 × 34.8 m) had seven contubernia (c. 19 m²) and a 53 m² officer’s quarter. Variations existed:

Baracks	Length	Width	Head building	Contubernia Quantity	Contubernia Size
1	35,4 m	6,45 m	59 m²	6	18,0 m²
2	35,4 m	7,20 m	97 m²	5	20,8 m²
3	35,0 m	5,25 m	no head	9	12,5 m²
4	34,8 m	7,37 m	53 m²	7	19,4 m²

Building 7 (20.8 × 13.1 m) was a multi-purpose horreum and armamentaria. Buildings 8 and 9 were stables, and Building 10’s function is unclear. Streets were gravel, and wastewater was managed via a main drain.

==== Period 2a (Repair Phase) ====
Period 2a involved repairs, including post replacements and hearth relocations, with the principia’s aedes principiorum rear wall aligned.

==== Period 3 (Post-Fort Phase) ====
After the troops advanced to the so-called "Vordere Limes", Period 3 saw civilian ironworking using a bloomery (smelting furnace). The operation was short-lived due to low ore yields.

== Finds ==
=== Coins ===
Four identifiable coins were found, too few for precise dating: (Note: Dietwulf Baatz surmised that the low number of finds could possibly be due to the fact that the camp had never been destroyed during its entire existence and had been cleared peacefully in the end. Objects of value were usually found in large numbers in destruction horizons or in depots. The former were not present in Hesselbach, the evacuation of the fort had taken place under peaceful circumstances, and there had obviously been no need to form depots to protect against enemy attacks (Baatz, Dietwulf (1973). Kastell Hesselbach: une andere Forschungen am Odenwaldlimes [Fort Hesselbach and other research on the Odenwald Limes]. Limesforschungen: Studien zur Organisation der römischen Reichsgrenze an Rhein und Donau (in German). Saalburgmuseum. Berlin: Gebr. Mann. p. 82. ISBN 978-3-7861-1059-0.).)

Unit	Representation	Coining	Place of coining	RIC	Finding place	Year of find	Remarks
Denarius	Vitellius	69	Rome	224 No. 2 (1)	Period 2 post trench	1965	
As or Dupondius	Domitian (?)	81–96 (?)	Rome		within "Building 4"	1966	fully corroded
Denarius	Trajan	114–117	Rome	337	from a well outside the fort	1902	
Dupondius	Hadrian	119–121	Rome	601 (c)		1895	

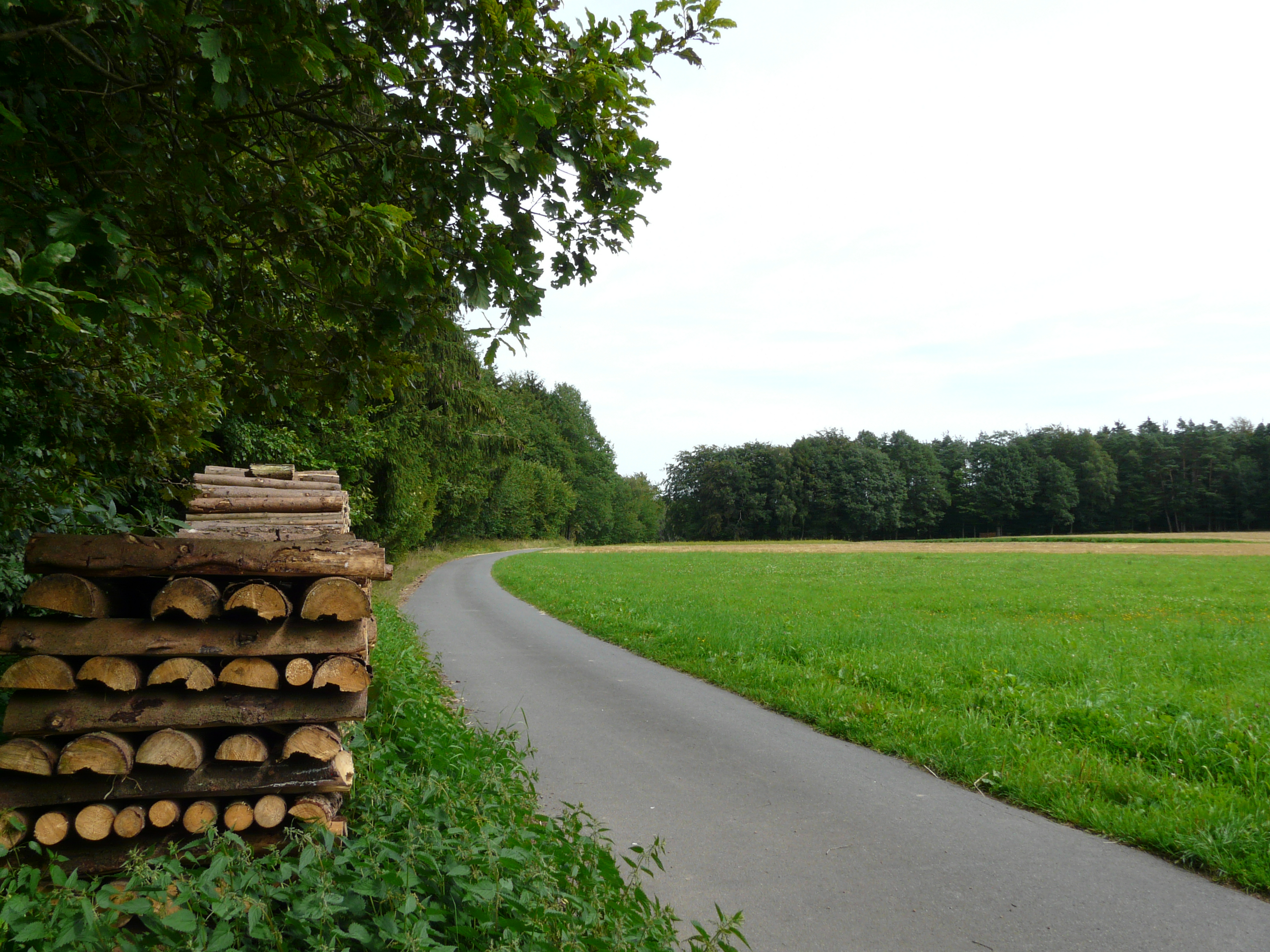
Current terrain near the Limes north of Hesselbach

=== Sigillata ===
Terra sigillata (24% of 932 ceramic finds) provided key dating evidence, with South Gaulish bowls suggesting a founding date of 95–105.

=== Other Finds ===
Ceramics included coarse ware (50%), heavy ceramics (14%), and others. Metal finds were sparse, including nails and a fibula. Over 100 tiles, mostly lateres, suggest limited use, possibly from a bathhouse. Sandstone balls (200 g to 20 kg) may have been weights or grinding stones.

== Heritage Protection ==
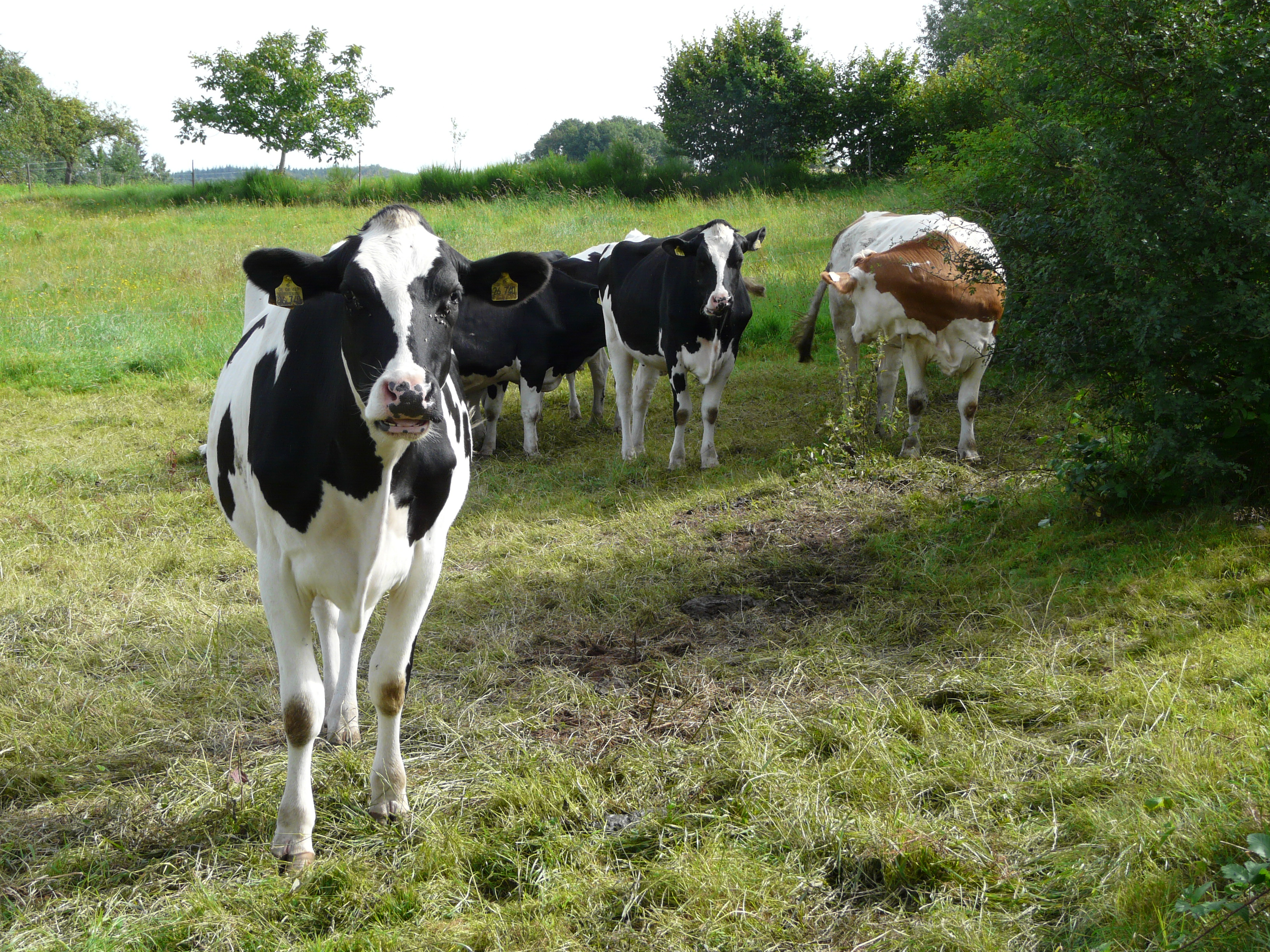
Current site (retentura near Porta principalis dextra, August 2009)

Hesselbach fort is protected under the Hessian Heritage Protection Act. Investigations require permits, and finds must be reported.
