= Christian Wilhelm Karl Kehrer =

German painter

Christian Wilhelm Karl Kehrer (b.30 May 1775 d. 21. February 1869) of Erbach was a German hunting and animal painter, court painter and archivist.

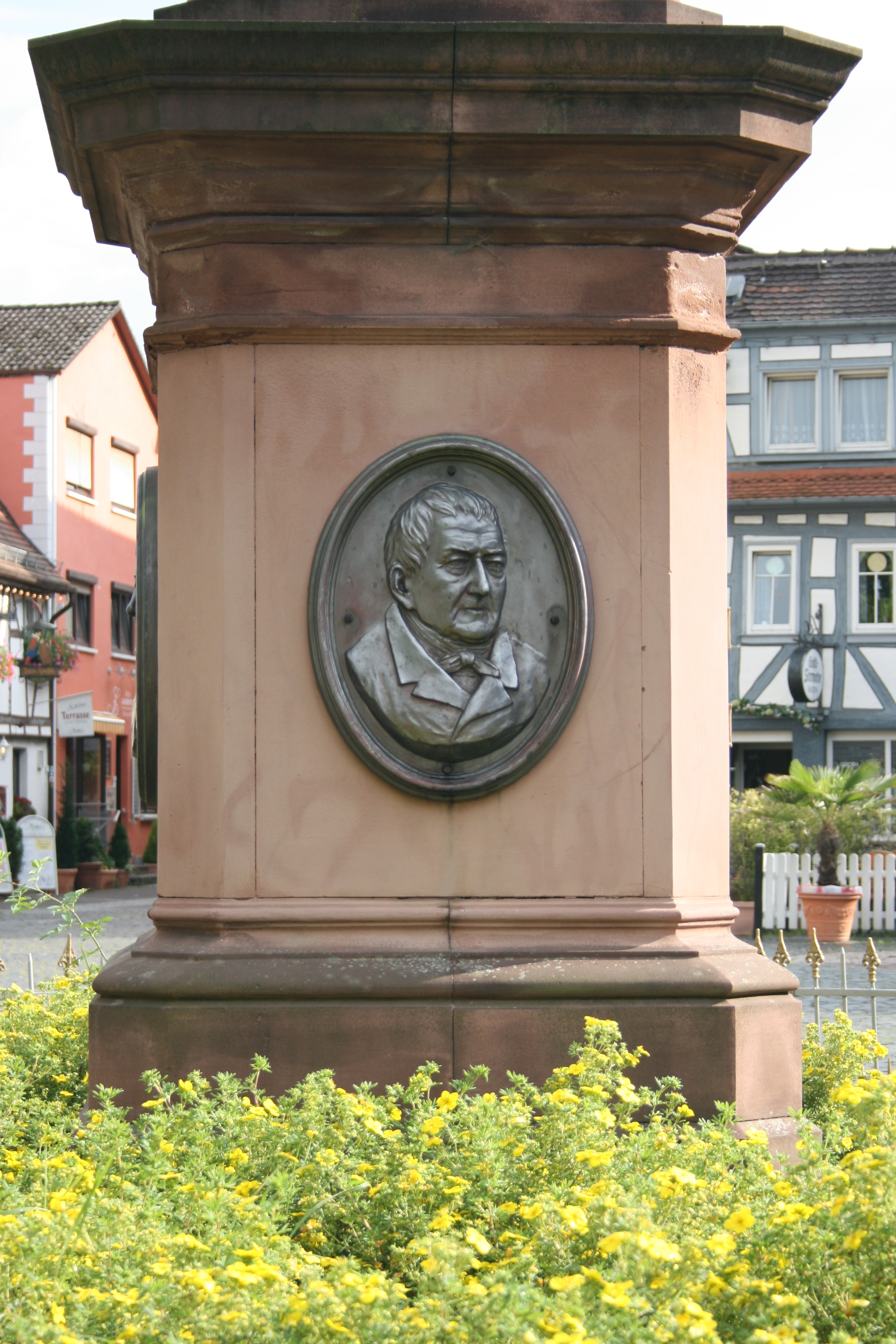
Medallion with a portrait of Christian Kehrer on the base of the monument to Franz I., Graf of Erbach-Erbach in the market square of Erbach in the Odenwald

== Life ==
Kehrer came from a family of the uplands of the Odenwald who produced many artists. His older brother was the painter, Karl Christian Kehrer.

After leaving school, Kehrer received a scholarship from the Graf of Erbach-Erbach, Franz I., which enabled him to reside in Würzburg from 1793 to 1797, where he studied under the court painter Johann Christoph Fesel (1737-1805). His first exhibition was in 1800 at the Berlin Academy, where his exhibits employed a roebuck motif. After a brief time at Saarbrücken in the court of the Herzogin of Braunschweig-Bevern, he returned to Erbach where he was employed as the private secretary of the Graf, who recognized his talent as a painter and encouraged him. In 1814, he was appointed to the governing council of the comital archives.

Kehrer maintained his connections to Erbach and its ruling house throughout his life, though he fell out favour in 1820, when he pointed out to the Graf that the Roman legionary eagle found near Würzburg was a blatant fake. The Graf had erected a memorial called the Adlerstein of Würzberg at the supposed site of its discovery. Representations by Charlotte, the eldest daughter of the Graf, encouraged Kehrer to not abandon the ruling house, and he was eventually restored to favour after the death of the old Graf in 1823. His continued favour is amply demonstrated by the monument in the market square of Erbach which was dedicated to the Graf in 1874. On its base are three medallions, commemorating the forestry commissioner, Friedrich Louis (south side), the politician, Johann Friedrich Knapp (east side), and Christian Wilhelm Karl Kehrer (north side).

== Work ==
Kehrer created catalogs of the papers of the comital archives, and copied many of its old manuscripts and illustrations. His illustrations of the excavations of the old Roman frontier fortifications, called the Odenwaldlimes, are amongst the earliest of such in Germany.

Kehrer also received large commissions from outside Erbach. King Friedrich I. of Württemberg commissioned Kehrer to create paintings for his hunting lodge in the grounds of Freudental Castle. From 1823 to 1827, Kehrer also painted large hunting scenes for Wilhelm I., the Herzog of Nassau, to hang in his hunting lodge near Wiesbaden.

Around 1861, Kehrer made a partial copy of an illustrated manuscript from the middle of the 15th century from the former estates of the Graf, which is now preserved in the National Museum of Germany located in Nuremberg.

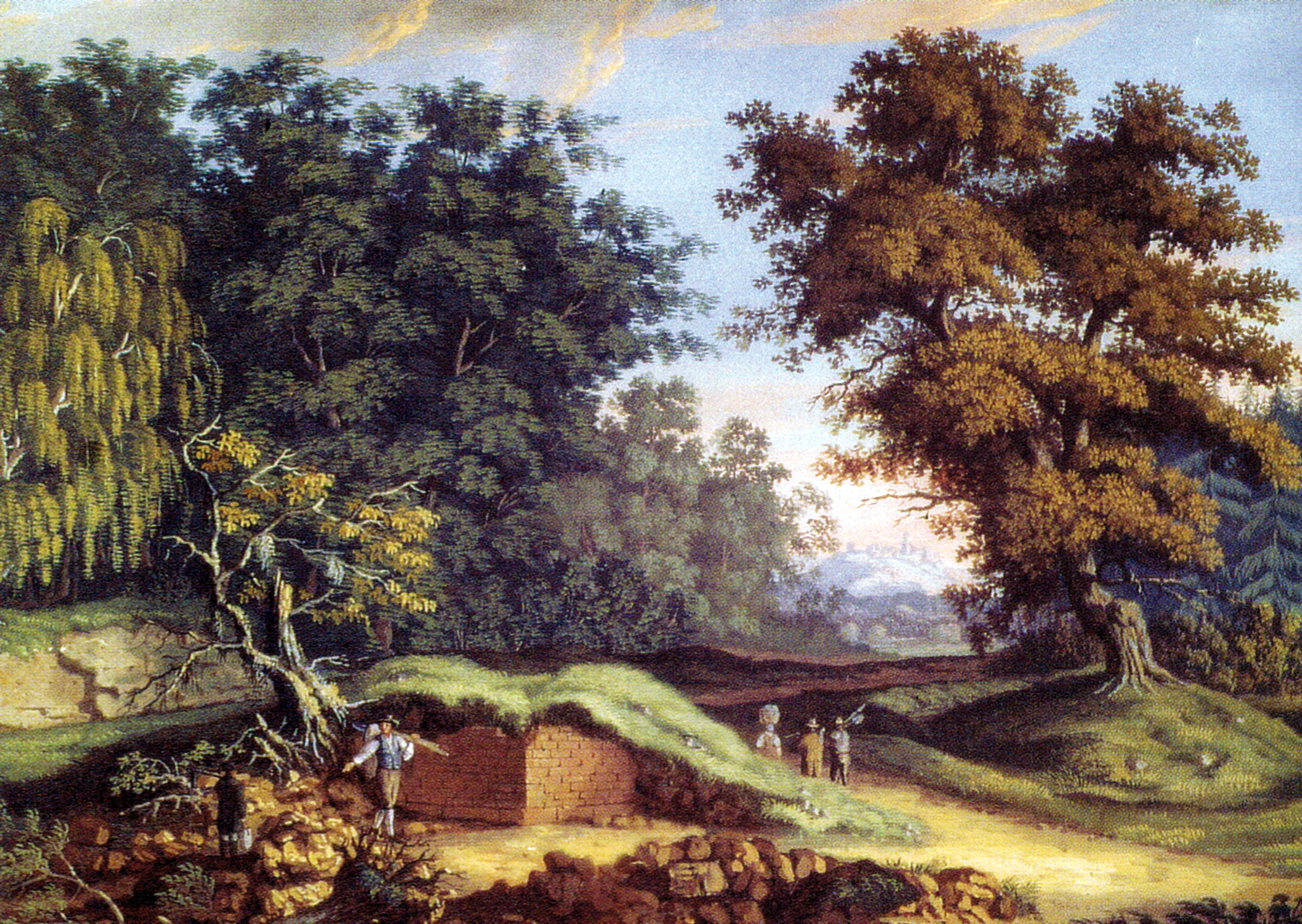
Stone and wooden towers at the Roman fortifications called the Odenwaldlimes, watercolour, around 1800.

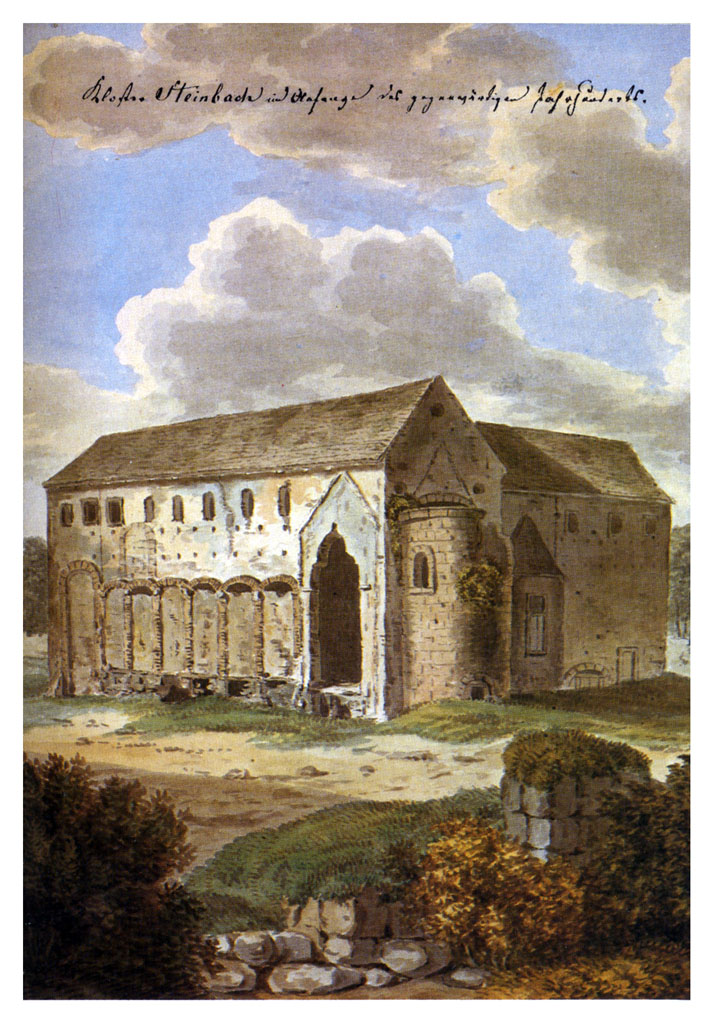
Monastery of Steinbach of the present century, watercolour on paper, around 1800.

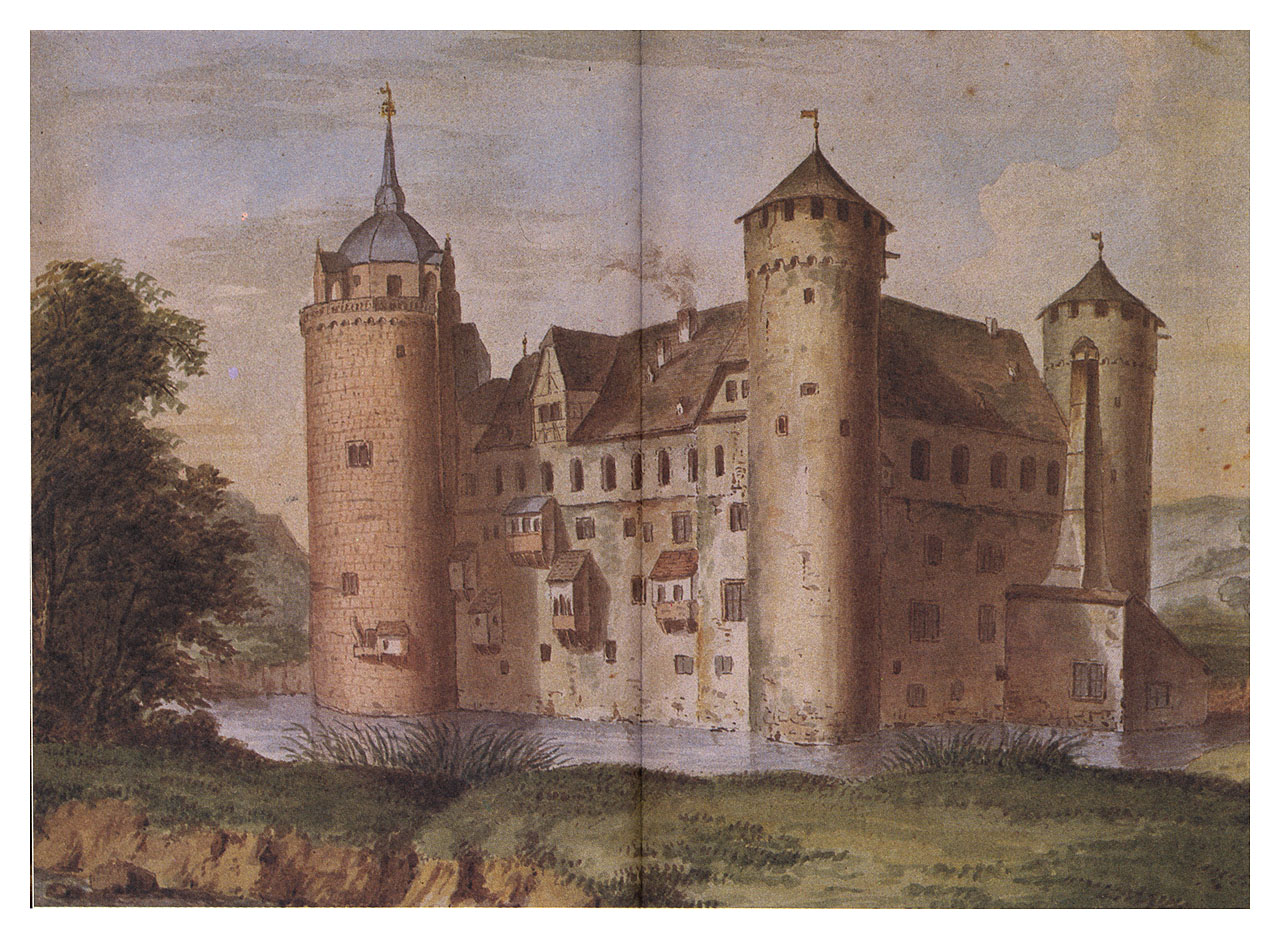
View of the castle of Fürstenau, watercolour on paper, around 1800.

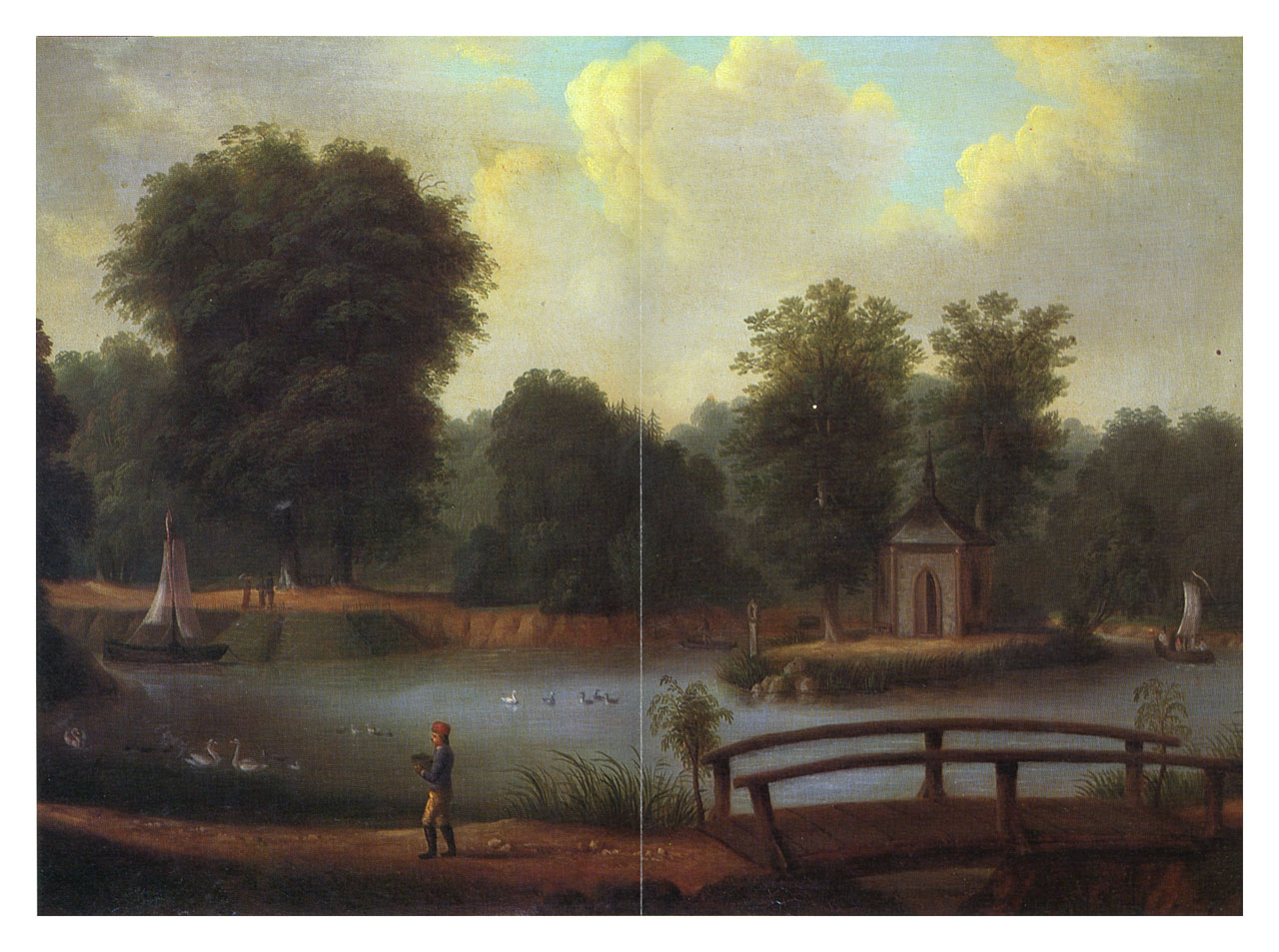
Eulbach Park, oil painting, around 1820.

== Literature ==
Kehrer, Christian in Allgemeines Lexikon der Bildenden Künstler von der Antike bis zur Gegenwart by Hans Vollmer (ed), Kaufmann–Knilling and E.A. Seemann, Leipzig, vol.20 (1927) p. 61–62.

Kehrer (luth.) by Friedrich Piel in Neue Deutsche Biographie (NDB), Duncker & Humblot, Berlin, vol.11 (1977) p. 400f. ISBN 3-428-00192-3.
