= Brombach =

Brombach may refer to:

- Brombach (Mümling), a river of Hesse, Germany, tributary of the Mümling
- Brombach (Swabian Rezat), a river of Bavaria, Germany, tributary of the Swabian Rezat
- Brombach, a district of the community Fürth, Hesse, Germany
- Brombach, a district of the municipality Schmitten, Germany, Hesse
- Brombach, a district of the town Eberbach (Baden), Baden-Württemberg, Germany
- Brombach (Lörrach), a district of the city Lörrach, Baden-Württemberg, Germany
- Brombach, a district of the town Overath, North Rhine-Westphalia, Germany

== See also ==
- Oberbrombach, an Ortsgemeinde in Rhineland-Palatinate, Germany
- Niederbrombach, an Ortsgemeinde in Rhineland-Palatinate, Germany
