= Günterfürst =

- Village of Erbach (Odenwald)
- Interactive map of Günterfürst
- Location within Germany Location within Hesse
- Coordinates: 49°38′10″N 8°58′39″E
- Country: Germany
- State: Hesse
- District: Odenwaldkreis
- Town: Erbach (Odenwald)

Area
  - Total: 4.08 km^{2} (1.58 sq mi)
- Elevation: 320 m (1,050 ft)

Population (2009-12-31)
  - Total: 730
  - Density: 180/km^{2} (460/sq mi)
- Time zone: UTC+01:00 (CET)
  - Summer (DST): UTC+02:00 (CEST)
- Postal codes: 64711
- Dialling codes: 06062

Günterfürst is a village in Erbach im Odenwald, Germany. As of 2009, it had a population of 700. Günterfürst lies south of Erbach and west of the river Mümling. The founding of a village named Gundersfirst dates from 1347. In 1806 it was incorporated into the Grand Duchy of Hesse. Günterfürst could be reached through the K 46 street that is connected to the Bundesstraße 45.

== Tradition ==
Every year from the 1st to the 24th of December, one family each day decorates a window of their house with Christmas decorations. The citizens would gather in this house with their whole family and celebrate the night with Christmas carols and poems. They would also bring mulled wine and cookies.
