= Erbach, Hesse =

Erbach
- Town
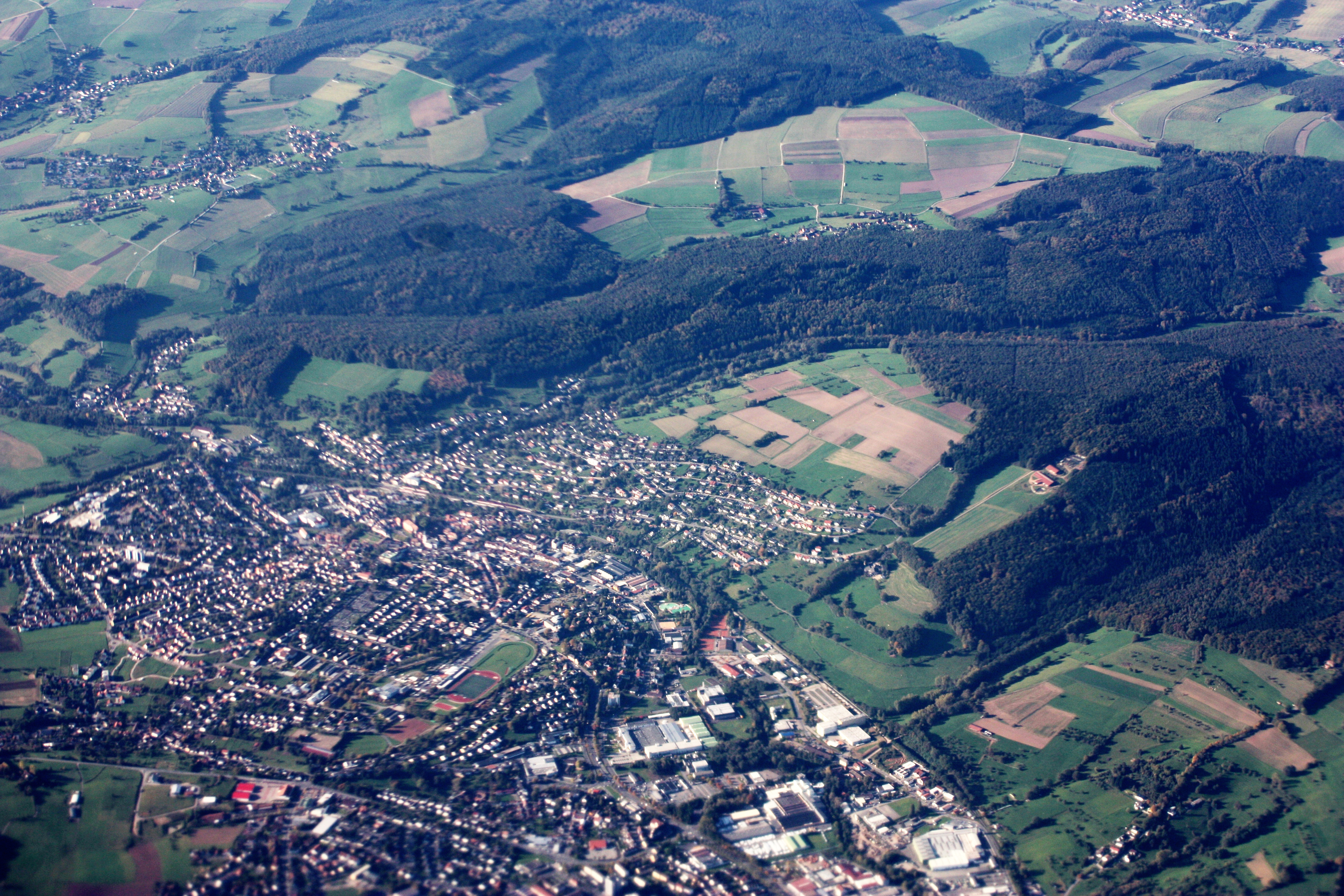
- Aerial view of Erbach

- Coat of arms

- Location of Erbach within Odenwaldkreis district
- Interactive map of Erbach
- Location within Germany Location within Hesse
- Coordinates: 49°39′30″N 8°59′45″E
- Country: Germany
- State: Hesse
- Admin. region: Darmstadt
- District: Odenwaldkreis
- Subdivisions: 12 Stadtteile

Government
  - Mayor (2024–30): Peter Traub (Ind.)

Area
  - Total: 61.52 km^{2} (23.75 sq mi)
- Elevation: 250 m (820 ft)

Population (2025-12-31)
  - Total: 13,858
  - Density: 225.3/km^{2} (583.4/sq mi)
- Time zone: UTC+01:00 (CET)
  - Summer (DST): UTC+02:00 (CEST)
- Postal codes: 64711
- Dialling codes: 06062
- Vehicle registration: ERB
- Website: www.erbach.de

Erbach (German pronunciation: [ˈɛʁbax]) is a town and the district seat of the Odenwaldkreis (district) in Hesse, Germany. It has a population of around 14,000.

== Geography ==
=== Location ===
The town lies in the Mittelgebirge Odenwald at elevations between 200 and 560 m in the valley of the Mümling.

One geological peculiarity is the creek Erdbach's complete disappearance within Dorf-Erbach's community area. The Erdbach reappears near Stockheim. There are several places where the Erdbach disappears into the ground.

=== Neighbouring communities ===
Erbach borders in the north on the town of Michelstadt, in the east on the market town of Kirchzell (in Miltenberg district in Bavaria), in the south on the community of Hesseneck and the town of Beerfelden and in the west on the community of Mossautal (all three in the Odenwaldkreis). A planned merger with the neighbouring town of Michelstadt was blocked in November 2007 by a referendum (Bürgerentscheid). For the time being, ways are being sought to deepen the two towns' cooperation, and possibly consider a merger once again in a few years' time.

=== Constituent communities ===
Since the amalgamations within the framework of municipal reform in 1972, the district seat of Erbach has been made up of twelve Stadtteile:

Stadtteil	Area	Inhabitants	Remarks
Bullau	9.98 km^{2}	410	with the hamlet of Eutergund
Dorf-Erbach	4.08 km^{2}	1,610	with the hamlet of Habermannskreuz
Ebersberg	3.59 km^{2}	250	
Elsbach	3.01 km^{2}	120	
Erbach	10.89 km^{2}	8,410	with the hamlet of Roßbach
Erbuch		130	with Ernsbach
Erlenbach	4.28 km^{2}	900	
Ernsbach		110	with Erbuch
Günterfürst	4.08 km^{2}	760	
Haisterbach	5.88 km^{2}	420	with the hamlet of Marbach
Lauerbach	2.27 km^{2}	400	
Schönnen	5.53 km^{2}	320	

== History ==
Erbach has long been the residence of the Counts of Erbach, who trace their descent back to the 12th century, and who held the office of cup-bearer to the Electors Palatine of the Rhine until 1806. In 1532 the emperor Charles V made the county a direct fief of the Holy Roman Empire, on account of the services rendered by Count Eberhard during the Palatine Peasants' War.

In 1717 the family was divided into the three lines of Erbach-Fürstenau, Erbach-Erbach and Erbach-Schönberg, who rank for precedence, not according to the age of their descent, but according to the age of the chief of their line. In 1818 the counts of Erbach-Erbach inherited the county of Wartenberg-Roth, and in 1903 the count of Erbach-Schönberg was granted the title of Fürst (Prince) (the first Prince was Gustav, husband of Princess Marie of Battenberg). The county was incorporated with the duchy of Hesse-Darmstadt in the 19th century.

== Governance ==
=== Town council ===
The municipal election held on 26 March 2006 yielded the following results:

Parties and voter communities		% 2006	Seats; 2006	% 2016	Seats; 2016
CDU	Christian Democratic Union of Germany	36.7	11	24.3	8
SPD	Social Democratic Party of Germany	37.9	12	31.6	10
GREENS	Bündnis 90/Die Grünen	7.9	3	9.7	3
FDP	Free Democratic Party	4.0	1	7.2	2
ÜWG	Überparteiliche Wählergemeinschaft der Kreisstadt Erbach e.V.	13.5	4	27.2	8
Total		100.0	31	100.0	37
Voter turnout in %		52.4		55.4	

=== Mayors ===
Buschmann was re-elected in 2012 with 52.7% of the votes.

Term of office	Name	Party
1919–1933	Wilhelm Dengler (1889–1951)	SPD
1945	Wilhelm Dengler (introduced)	SPD
1945–1960	Leonhard Volk	
1960–1987	Werner Borchers	ÜWG
1988–1994	Dieter Haver	CDU
1994–2000	Uwe Hartmann	SPD
2000–2018	Harald Buschmann	CDU
since 2018	Peter Traub	

=== Coat of arms ===
The town's arms might heraldically be described thus: Gules a bend wavy azure, thereon three mullets of six gules.

The wavy bend is taken to be a brook, and the mullets of six (six-pointed stars) were inspired by the arms formerly borne by the princely Counts of Erbach, who were lords of the Odenwald until 1806.

=== Town twinning ===
Erbach has partnerships with four towns in Europe:

- Ansião, Portugal
- Jičín, Czech Republic
- (Germany) Königsee, Thuringia
- Le Pont-de-Beauvoisin, (Isère) and Le Pont-de-Beauvoisin (Savoie), France

== Culture and sightseeing ==
=== Buildings ===
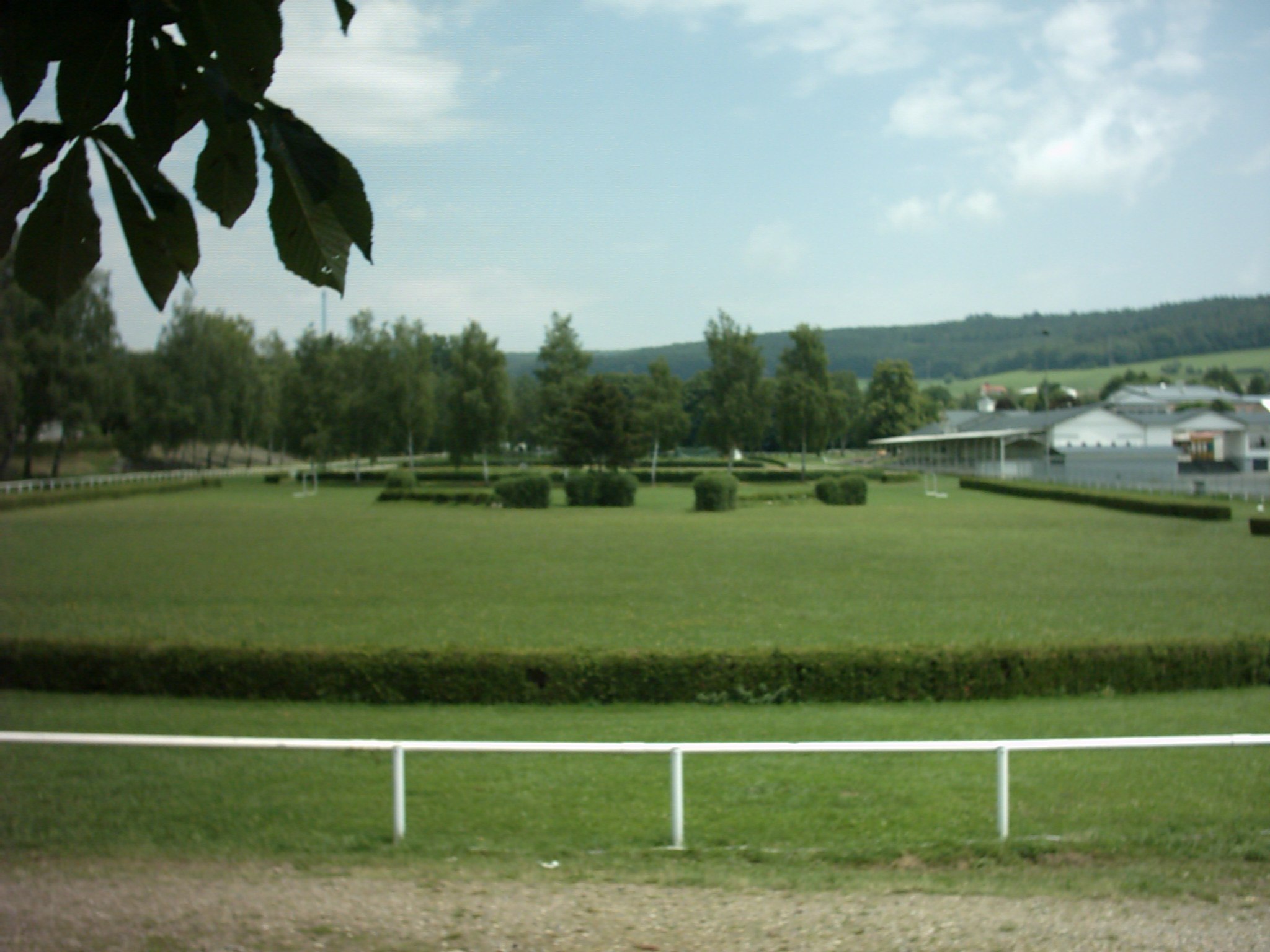
Harness racing track

Counts' castle, with its Orangerie at far right and the garden in the foreground.

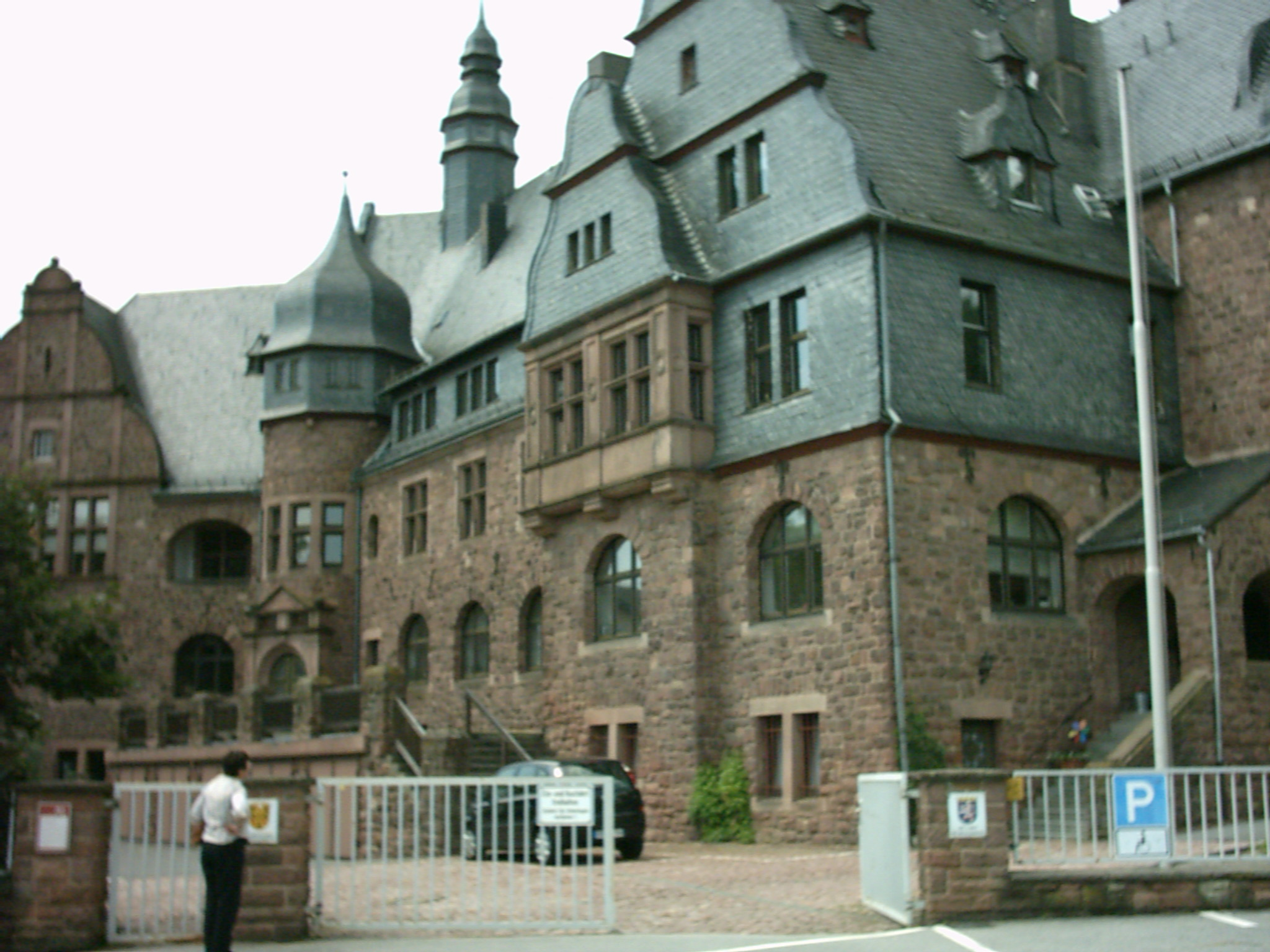
Odenwaldkreis district council office

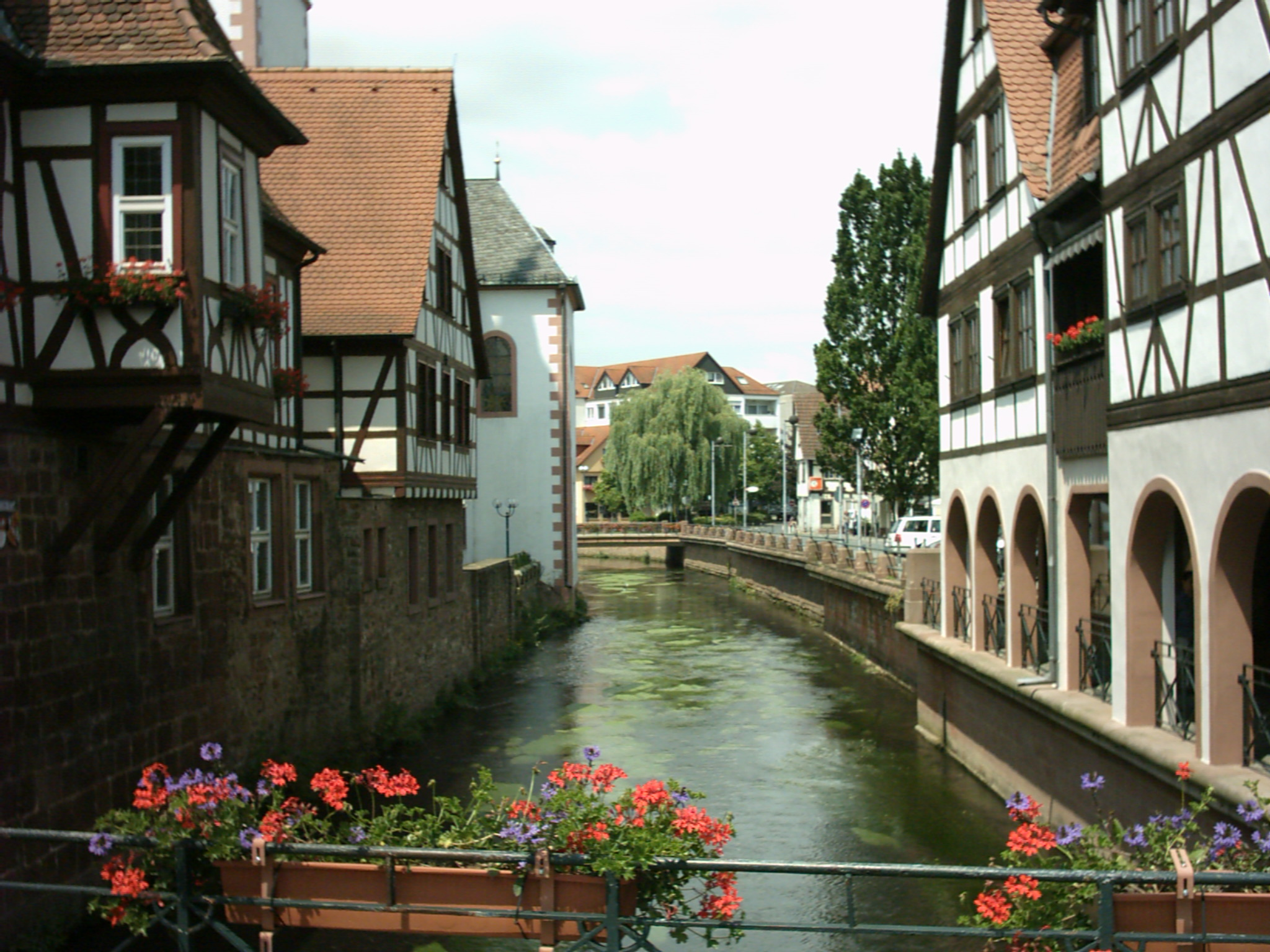
Timber-frame houses on the Mümling

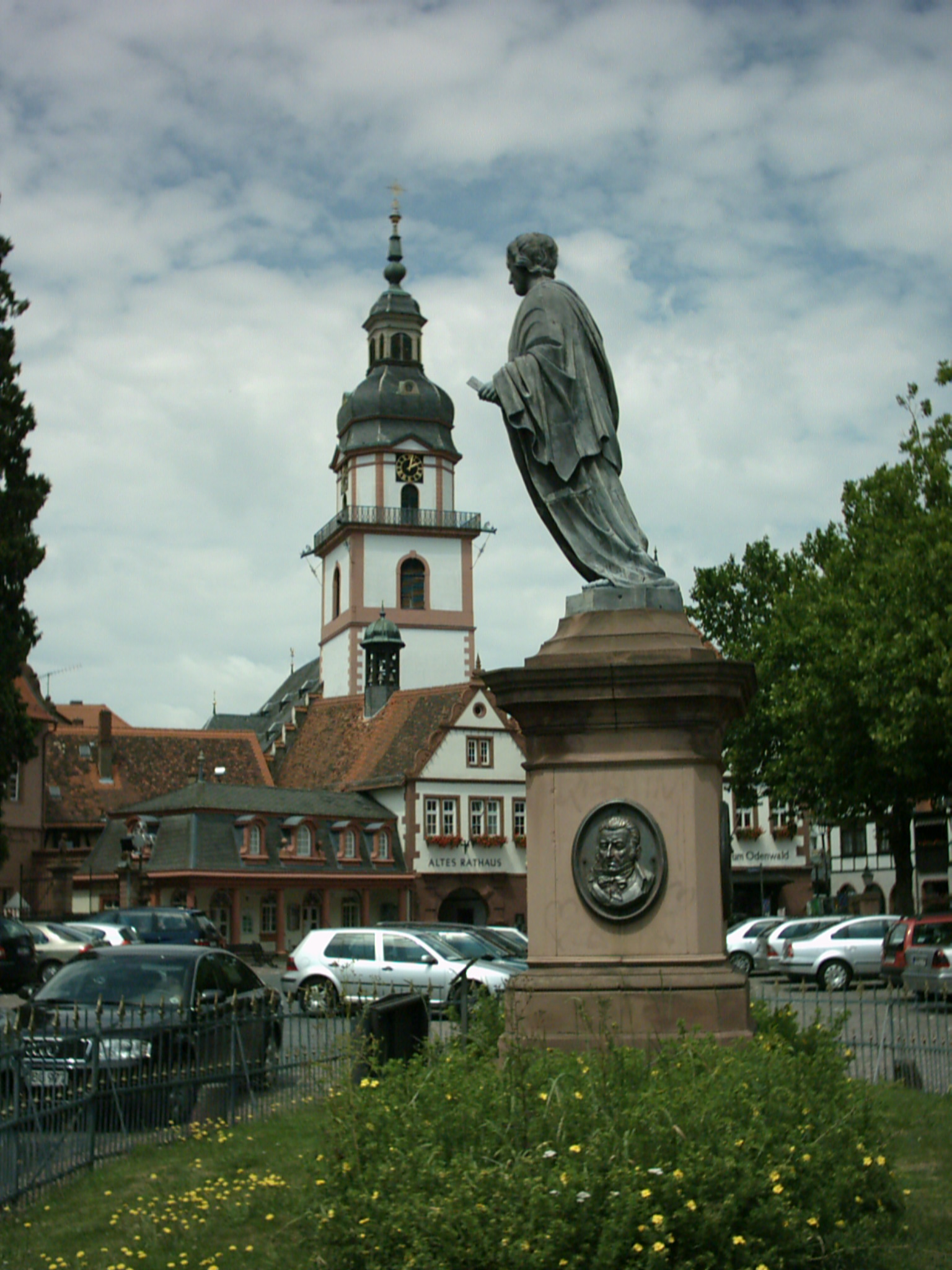
Memorial to Count Franz I before the castle

==== Castle of the Counts of Erbach-Erbach ====
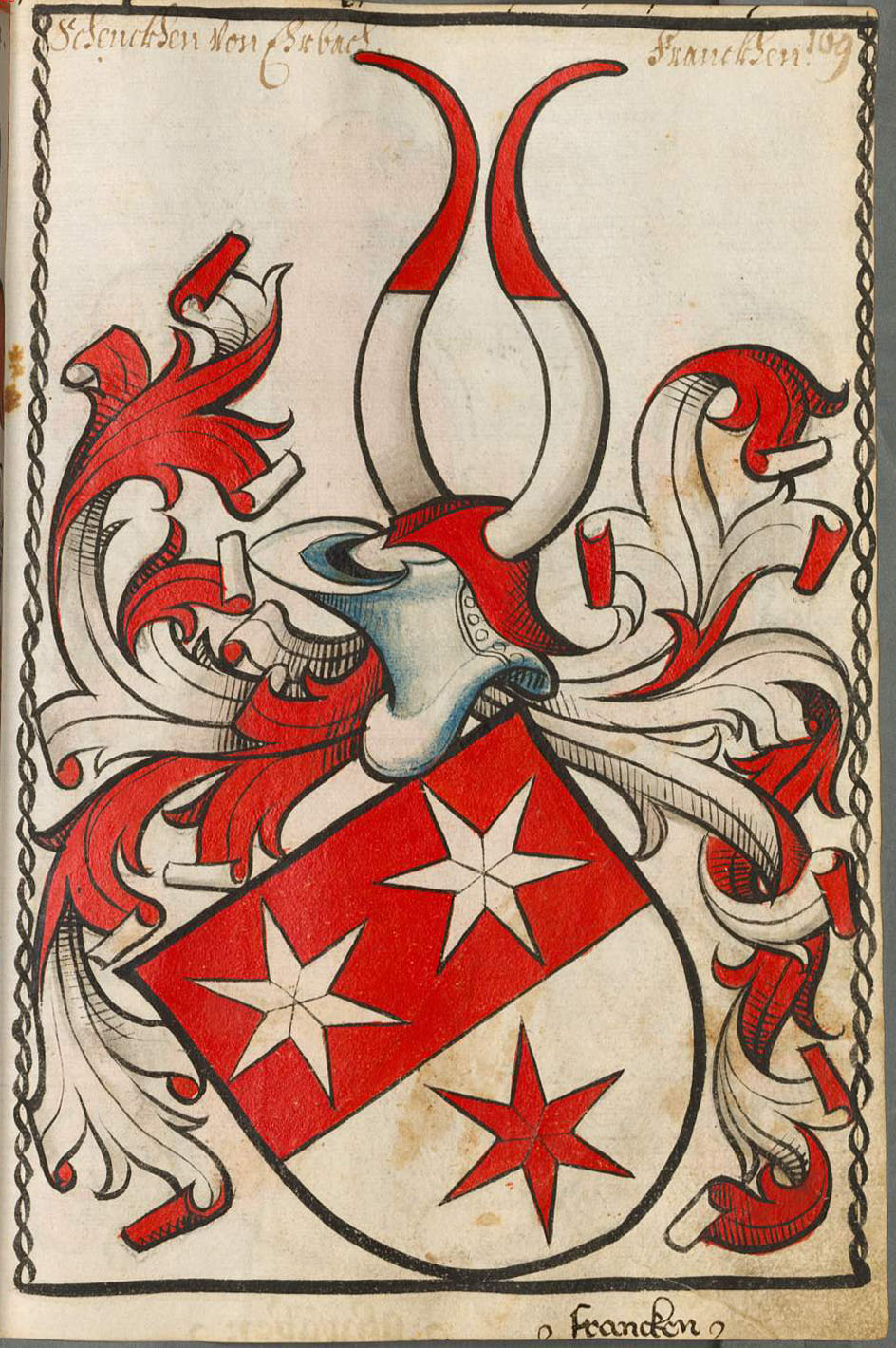
Coat of arms of the County of Erbach, from the Scheibler Armorial (1450-80)

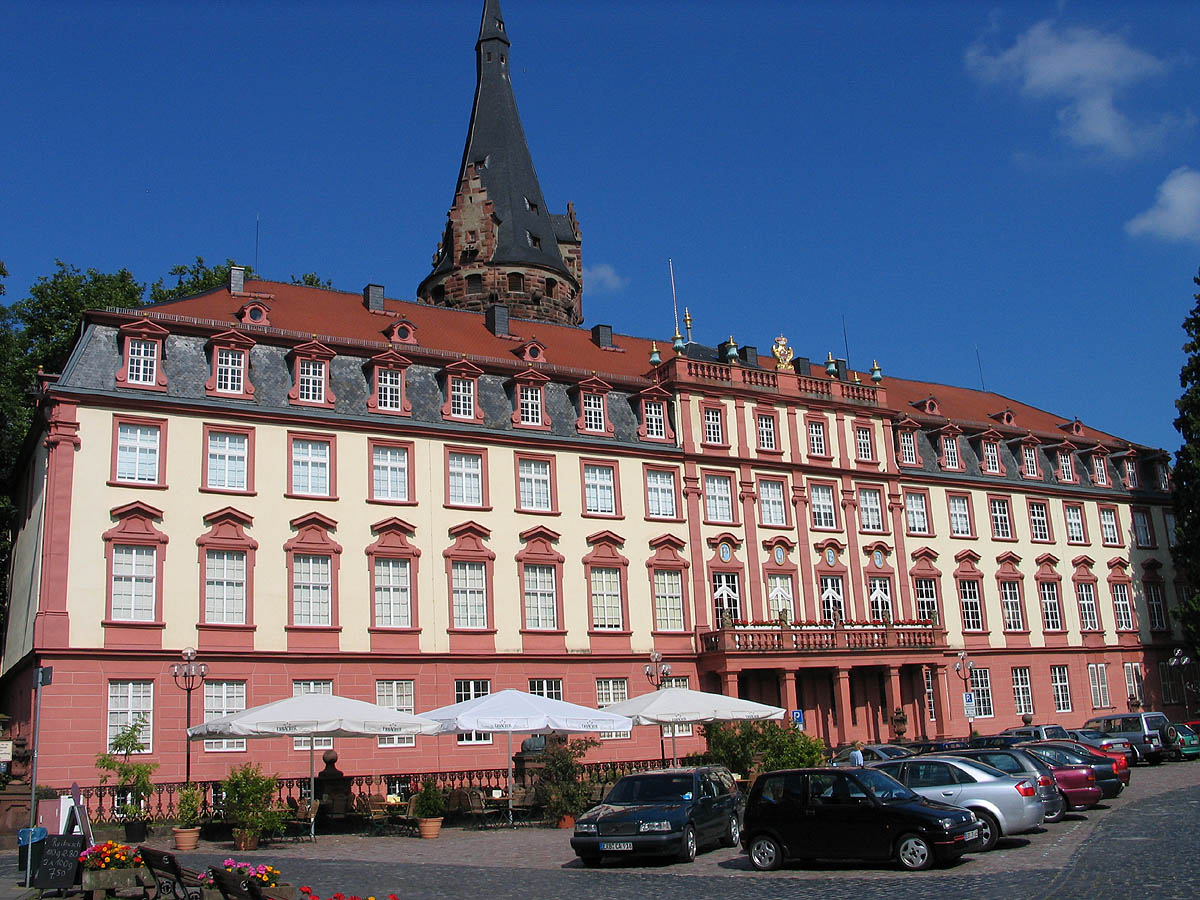
Erbach Palace

Erbach Palace, the castle of the princely Counts of Erbach, was built into a residence in the style of the times in the 18th century. Since the noble house did not have the needed materials on hand, only the middle wing of the planned three-winged building was ever built. The façade is to a great extent built out of not sandstone, but rather sheeting or wood coloured to look like it.

The antique collections at the castle have remained almost unchanged since Count Franz I's time (1754–1823).

In 2005, the state of Hesse bought the castle for €13,000,000.

Within the castle complex is the likewise Late Baroque orangery with the castle garden.

==== Citizens' initiatives ====
In the area of the orangery and the castle garden, a citizens' initiative in the 1970s managed to thwart plans to tear down the orangery and build a highrise hotel on the site

The memorial on the castle square to Count Franz I – the last ruling count – that was knocked off its pedestal and thereby broken was repaired and set back in place with support from two Darmstadt artists and some Erbach citizens. The work was financed through grants from the Landesamt für Denkmalpflege ("State Office for Care of Monuments") as well as donations.

== Regular events ==
=== Wiesenmarkt/Eulbacher Markt ===
The Erbacher Wiesenmarkt ("meadow market") was originally called the Eulbacher Markt or Eulbacher Wiesen(Vieh-)markt. Eulbach is an outlying centre of the neighbouring town of Michelstadt. It was once a regionally very important livestock, horse and farm market.

The livestock and farm market was only moved to Erbach sometime in the late 19th or early 20th century by the Counts of Eulbach. Until about 1960, the livestock and horse market with its associated horseracing and other horse sports was the main part of the Eulbacher Markt. The Schützenhaus ("Marksmen's House") standing on the way into the Wiesenmarkt, however, suggests that the Eulbacher Markt, at least in part, must already have been held in Erbach as early as the mid 19th century: it was here that the Democratic Revolutionaries met in 1848 and on what is now the market grounds beside the Schützenhaus that the Odenwald "Moot" (Volksversammlung) was held under the Michelstadt revolutionary and lawyer Ludwig Bogen's leadership.

=== Museums ===
Franz I, the last ruling count (1754–1823), introduced ivory carving in 1783, thus giving the town the nickname Elfenbeinstadt ("Ivory Town"). Many artists made their homes here and today their works and activities can still be admired at the town's Deutsches Elfenbeinmuseum Erbach. Owing to widespread bans on ivory hunting and trading introduced in 1989, alternative materials are used today. In particular, prehistoric mammoth tusk, still found from time to time in the Siberian tundra, has replaced elephant ivory. Other than its slightly different colour, it has comparable properties.

The Deutsches Elfenbeinmuseum Erbach ("Erbach German Ivory Museum") has been in existence since 1966 and is unique in Europe. It exhibits historical and contemporary works in ivory. At the Berufliches Schulzentrum Odenwaldkreis in nearby Michelstadt, students learn (mammoth) ivory carving and give regular displays of their work.

== Economy ==
=== Established businesses ===
- Bosch Rexroth AG, Erbach works, Electric Drives and Controls division
- Rowenta, Erbach works (clothes iron manufacturing)
- Koziol GmbH, plastic articles
- German Ivory Museum

== Infrastructure ==
=== Transport ===
Erbach lies on Bundesstraßen 45 and 47, and also on the Odenwald Railway (RMV Line 65; Frankfurt–Darmstadt/Hanau–Erbach–Eberbach). A planned Bundesstraße 45 bypass proposed since the 1970s has once again been included in Hesse state planning.

== Education ==
- Schule am Treppenweg (primary school)
- Astrid-Lindgren-Schule (primary school)
- Schule am Sportpark (Hauptschule and Realschule with transition level)
- Schule am Drachenfeld (special school with department for physically handicapped learners)

== Notable people ==
- Franz, Count of Erbach-Erbach (b.1754 d.1823), nobleman and art collector
- Karl Christian Kehrer (b.1755 d.1833), portrait painter
- Christian Wilhelm Karl Kehrer (b.1775 d.1869), court painter and archivist
- Heinrich List (b.1882 d.1942), farmer and Righteous among the Nations
- Norbert Busè (b.1963), filmmaker and film producer
- Oka Nikolov (b.1974), Football goalkeeper
- Jessica Schwarz (b.1977), actress and presenter
- Timo Boll (b.1981), table tennis player
- Veit Laurent Kurz (b.1985), visual artist
- Meike Weber (b.1987), Football player
- Denis Huseinbasic (b.2001), football player
