= German Ivory Museum Erbach =

Museum in Germany

- Deutsches Elfenbeinmuseum Erbach
- Established: 1966
- Location: Erbach im Odenwald
- Type: Art
- Collection size: Ivory, Amber
- Director: Harald Buschmann
- President: Erbgraf Eberhard zu Erbach-Erbach
- Curator: Karlheinz Flach
- Website: https://www.schloesser-hessen.de/de/schloss-erbach/elfenbeinmuseum

The German Ivory Museum Erbach (Deutsches Elfenbeinmuseum Erbach) is a museum in Erbach im Odenwald, Germany. It was founded in 1966, but the collection was started by Count Francis I in the late 18th century. The city of Erbach then developed to become one of the world centres for ivory carving.

The museum exhibition consists of more than two thousand items that represent European, African, Asian, and Greenlandic ivory carving art from the Middle Ages to the present day. One of the focuses is the work of ivory carvers in the Odenwald area in the 19th and 20th centuries, for example Jan Holschuh.

In the 2020s the museum moved to the Erbach Palace. Other ivory museums in this region are the privately owned Ivory Museum Michelstadt and the church-owned Ivory Museum Walldürn.

== Literature ==
- Hans Werner Hegemann: Wegweiser durch das Deutsche Elfenbeinmuseum Erbach. Deutsches Elfenbeinmuseum, Erbach 1979
- Brochures of the German Ivory Museum Erbach.
