= Erdbach =

River in Germany

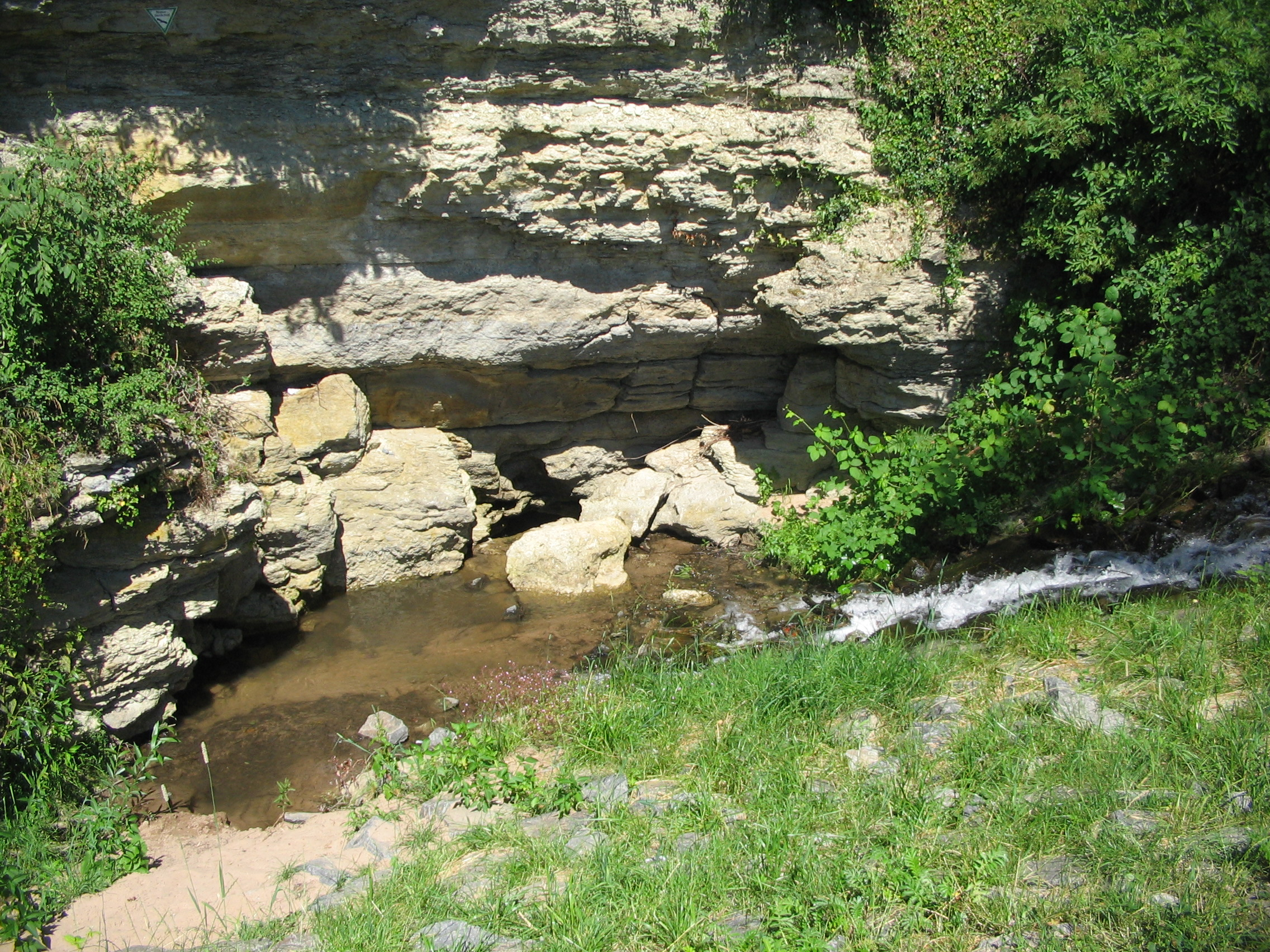

Location
- Country: Germany
- State: Hesse

Physical characteristics
- Mouth
  - location: Mümling
  - coordinates: 49°40′16″N 08°59′37″E

Basin features
- Progression: Mümling→ Main→ Rhine→ North Sea

Erdbach is a small river of Hesse, Germany. It flows into the Mümling near Michelstadt.

== See also ==
- List of rivers of Hesse
