= Haisterbach =

- Village of Erbach im Odenwald
- Interactive map of Haisterbach
- Location within Germany Location within Hesse
- Coordinates: 49°37′39″N 08°58′37″E
- Country: Germany
- State: Hesse
- District: Odenwaldkreis
- Town: Erbach im Odenwald

Area
  - Total: 5.88 km^{2} (2.27 sq mi)
- Elevation: 315 m (1,033 ft)

Population (2009-12-31)
  - Total: 423
  - Density: 71.9/km^{2} (186/sq mi)
- Time zone: UTC+01:00 (CET)
  - Summer (DST): UTC+02:00 (CEST)
- Postal codes: 64711
- Dialling codes: 06062

Haisterbach is a village in Erbach im Odenwald, Germany. im hessischen Odenwaldkreis. It also incorporates the hamlet of Marbach.

Haisterbach lies in the Odenwald, 3.5 kilometres (2.2 mi) southeast of city center. It was first mentioned in 1353. In 1939 the village had a population of 232.

The bus line 48 of the Odenwald-Regional-Gesellschaft (OREG) serves this village. It could also be reached via the Bundesstraße 45.

== Names ==
The name has changed over the years:

- Heysterbuch (1353)
- Heisterbuch (1414)
- Hesterbuch (1434)
- Heysterbuch (1443)
- Heisterbach (1484)
