= Brombach (Mümling) =

River in Germany

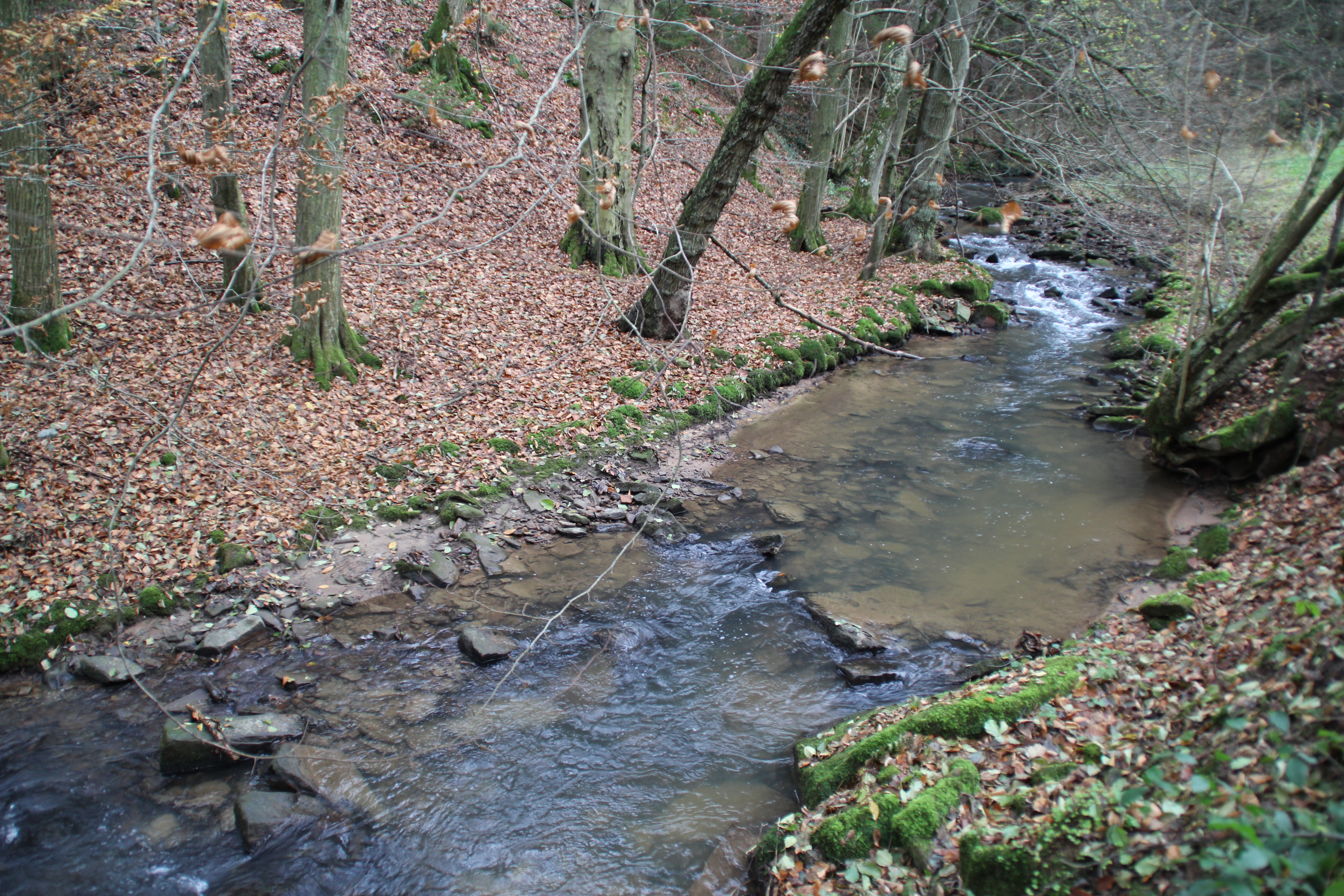
- The Brombach near Zell im Odenwald

Location
- Country: Germany
- State: Hesse

Physical characteristics
- Source
  - location: West of Rehbach (a district of Michelstadt) and Langen-Brombach (a district of Brombachtal)
  - coordinates: 49.7086°N 8.9254°E
- Mouth
  - location: In Zell im Odenwald (a district of Bad König)
  - coordinates: 49.7240°N 8.9937°E

Basin features
- Progression: Mümling→ Main→ Rhine→ North Sea

The Brombach is a six-kilometer-long river of Hesse, Germany.

The Brombach springs from several sources west of Rehbach (a district of Michelstadt) and of Langen-Brombach (a district of Brombachtal). In the district Zell im Odenwald of Bad König, it discharges into the Mümling on the left bank.

== See also ==
- List of rivers of Hesse
