= Karl Christian Kehrer =

German portrait, landscape and history painter (1755–1833)

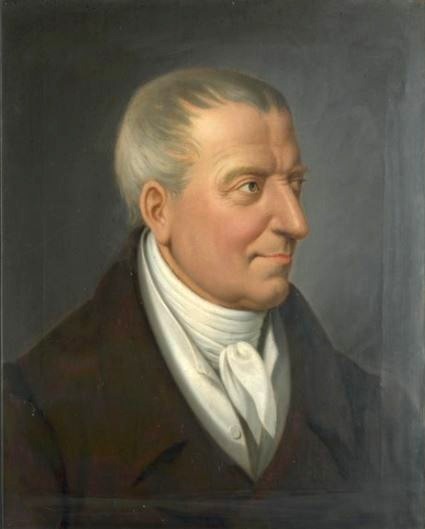
Self-portrait (c. 1820)

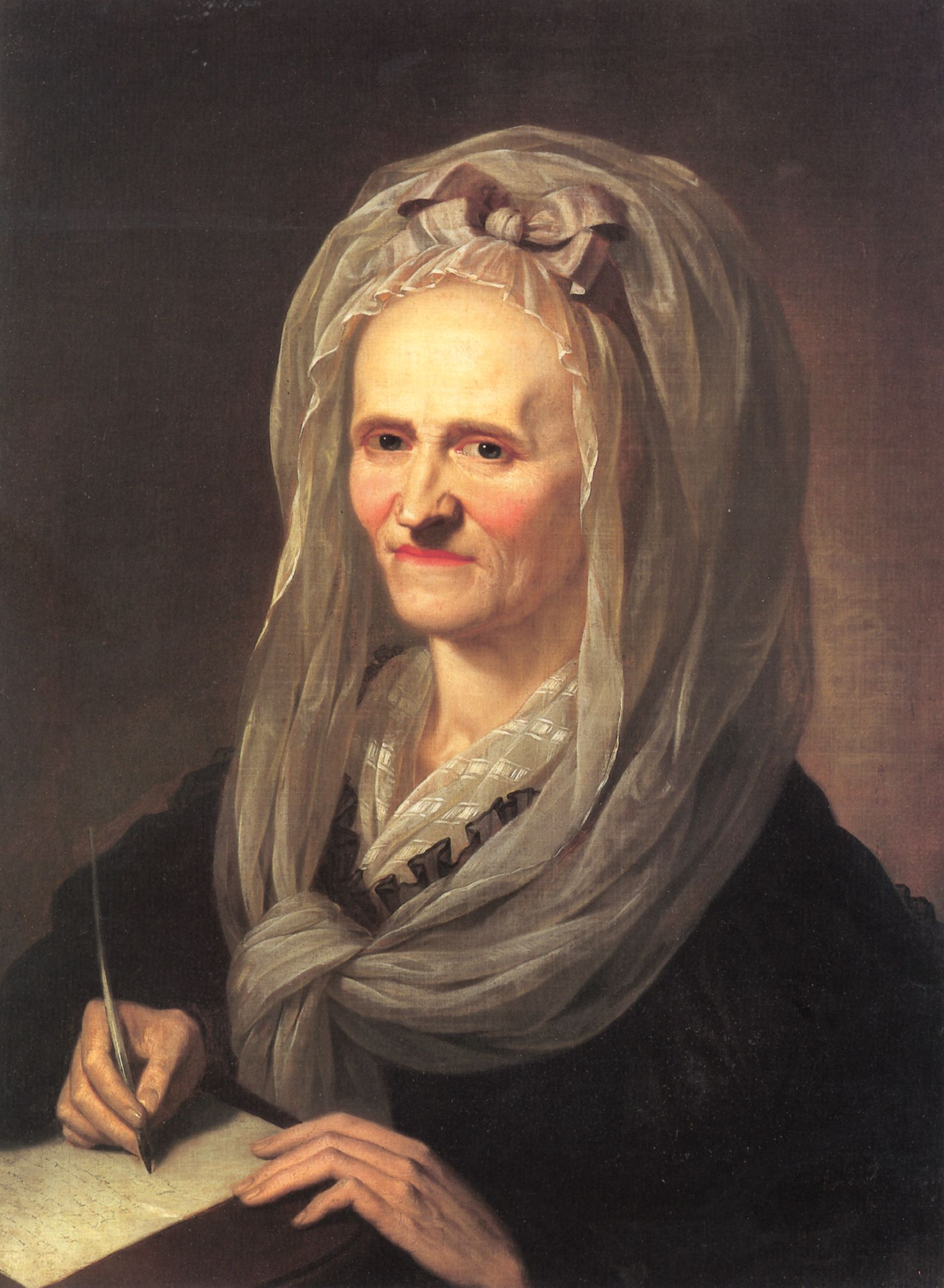
Portait of Anna Louisa Karsch

Karl Christian Kehrer (1 August 1755 – 7 April 1833) was a German portrait, landscape and history painter.

== Biography ==
He was born in Dillenburg to Martin Tobias Andreas Kehrer (1717–1790), a local land commissioner, and his wife Elisabeth Sophia née Luck (1730–1806). He received his first professional lessons from Anton Wilhelm Tischbein in Hanau, where he studied for four years. In 1777, he went to Erbach im Odenwald, where he worked as a portrait painter and made sketches along the Rhine.

After a brief stay in Hanover, he found employment at the Court of the Anhalt-Bernburg family in Ballenstedt in 1782. From 1785 to 1787, he was allowed to attend the Dresden Academy of Fine Arts, where he worked with Giovanni Battista Casanova then, after a visit to Leipzig, he returned to Ballenstedt.

The training he received in Dresden and the contacts he made there were crucial for his career. His skills finally took him to Berlin in 1790, where he stayed until 1792. The following year, he was admitted to the Prussian Academy of Arts as a member of the "Fine Arts Section". After 1815, he was also a member of the "Electoral Hessian Drawing Academy", forerunner to the present Staatliche Zeichenakademie Hanau.

In addition to portraits, which remain his best known works, he executed landscapes and genre scenes. He also painted scenes from works of poetry, including three from The Artist's Pilgrimage by Goethe, and historical representations, from contemporary events and the Thirty Years War.

His younger brother was the court painter and archivist, Christian Wilhelm Karl Kehrer.

Kehrer died in 1833 in Ballenstedt.

== Sources ==
- Georg Kaspar Nagler: Neues allgemeines Künstler-Lexicon. Verlag von E.A. Fleischmann, Munich 1837, pps.547–548 (Online)
- Lionel von Donop (1882). "Kehrer, Karl" . Allgemeine Deutsche Biographie (in German). Vol. 15. Leipzig: Duncker & Humblot. p. 529.
