= Norbert Busè =

German documentary filmmaker

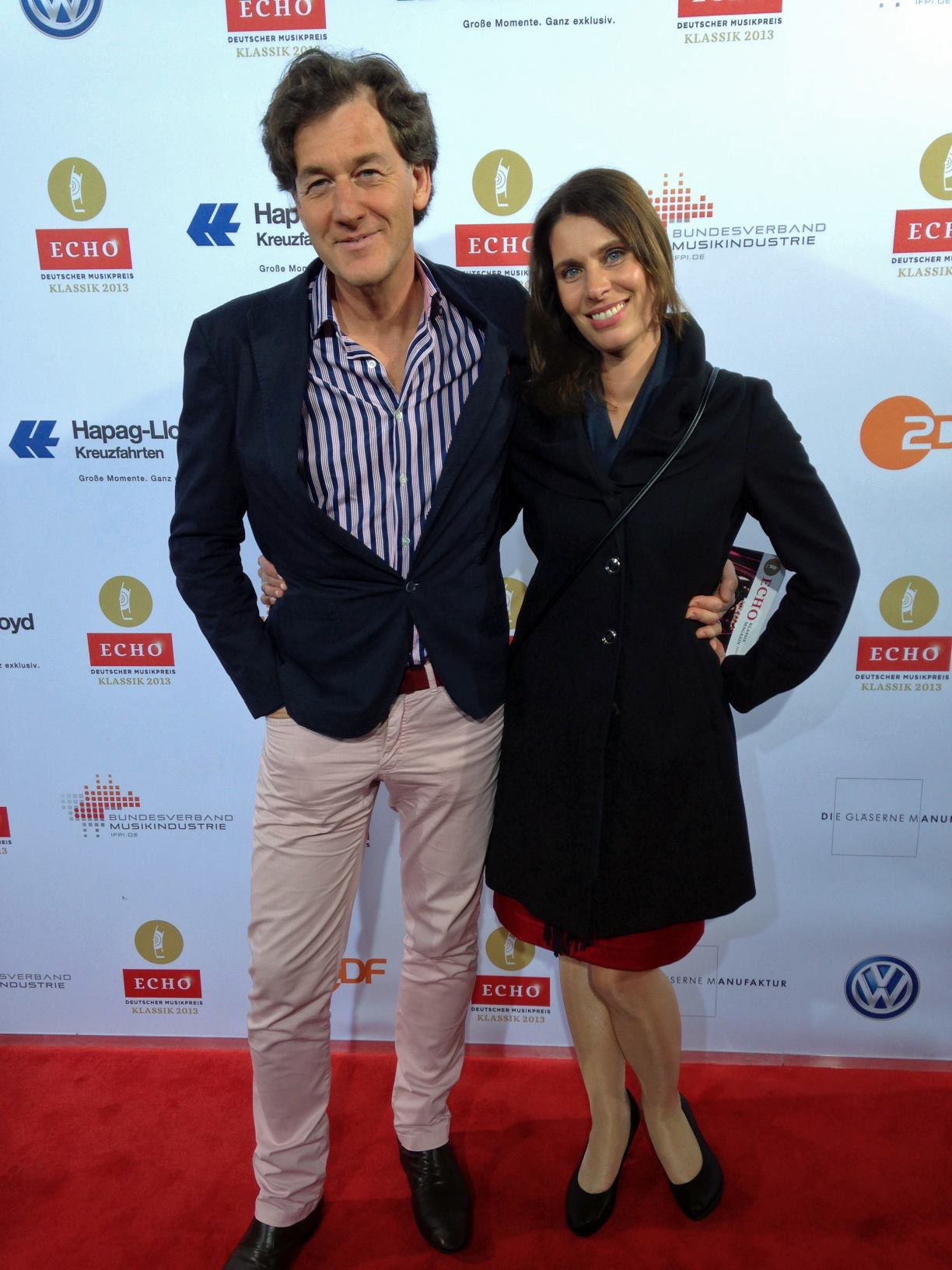
- Busè (left) at ECHO Klassik 2013
- Born: 1963 (age 62–63)
- Citizenship: Germany
- Years active: 1990–present

Norbert Busè (born 1963) is a German documentary filmmaker, film producer, and director.

== Biography ==
Norbert Busè grew up in Erbach in the Odenwald forest. He studied philosophy, education, German literature and theology and graduated with a diploma in religious education. He has been working on film projects since 1991. In 1993, he moved to Berlin, where he made documentaries and a number of experimental short films. His work to date has focused on topics related to culture, especially music. He produced the Arte Lounge in over thirty episodes, which was the first television show in Europe to feature classical musicians in a Berlin club. In 2010, he organized a choir festival in South Africa for the ARTE television channel. The highlight was the first-ever performance of the freedom song Ukuthula by all choirs together. Busè also produced films about musicians such as Karlheinz Stockhausen, John Cage, Elvis Presley, Sergiu Celibidache and Richard Strauss, which attracted international attention. In addition, he was one of the few artist to visualize traditional stage dances from Russia, Bolivia, India, Malaysia and Cuba in their living context for film, in order to awaken a new understanding of dance. Since 2017, he has been working increasingly on film biographies of famous personalities again. In his works, he often succeeds in particularly bringing out the essence of a personality and empathically bringing it closer to the viewer.

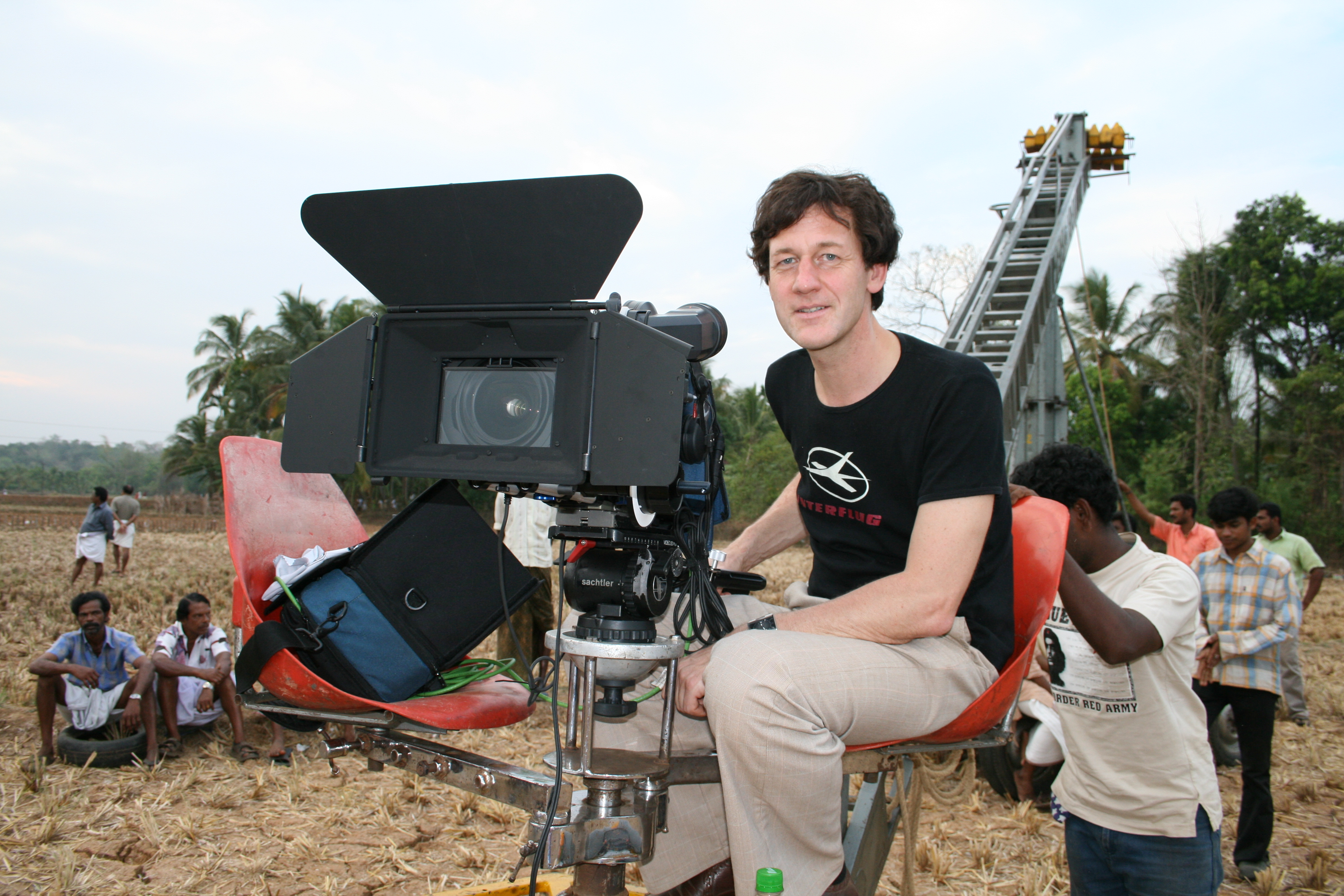
Norbert Busè zu Dreharbeiten in Madras, Indien 2007

Busè lives in Berlin, is married and has three children.

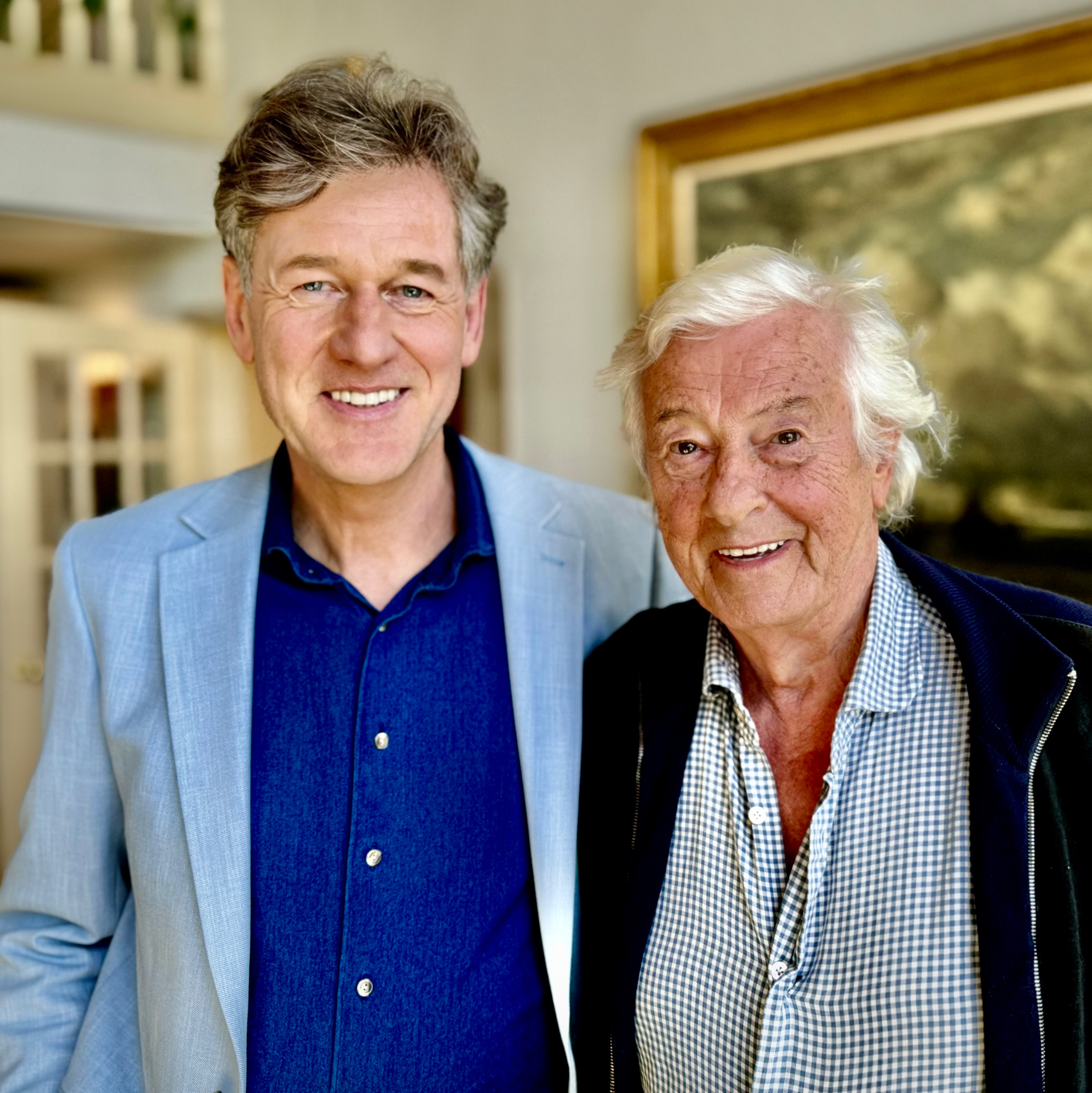
Director Norbert Busè met legendary director Paul Verhoeven in Hollywood in 2024 to shoot the film “Jesus goes to Hollywood”

== Work ==
In 2003 Busè began, in co-operation with UNESCO, ZDF and 3sat, the production of the 12-piece film project Meisterwerke der Menschheit [Mankind's Masterpieces]. The films showed the humanity's intangible cultural heritage and the threat under which even music finds itself. AVA - Die Stimme meiner Mutter [AVA- The Voice of my Mother], a 90-minute music documentary film, was Busè’s first feature-length film about the legacy and potential loss of Russian folk songs.

== Recognition ==
Norbert Busè has been officially recognised for his work, including internationally. In 1999 he won the audience-choice award in the youth category from the Film Council of Bremen [Filmbüro Bremen] with his first short film, Incubus. In 2004 he was awarded the Media Prize of the German Diabetes Foundation [Deutsche Diabetes-Stiftung] for his documentary on the epidemic of prosperity. In 2011, his production of Arte Lounge was nominated for the Grimme Prize in the entertainment category. In 2011 the four-part series Auf den Spuren von Easy Rider [Tracking Down Easy Rider] was awarded the gold medal for best production in the cultural category at the world's biggest television trade-show, NAB in Las Vegas. In 2014 he was nominated at the International Classical Music Awards for his directing of the film Sergiu Celibidache - Feuerkopf und Philosophy [Sergiu Celibidache: firebrand and philosopher]. In 2015 his production Richard Strauss and his Heroines won the ECHO Classical award for best DVD-production of the year, and at the International Classical Music Awards. Vogue magazine wrote about the film he produced 2024 about the history of the female punk movement in England in the seventies: ‘Punk Girls - The Female History of British Punk, a rousing documentary film’.

== Filmography ==
1990: Vor was habt Ihr eigentlich Angst? [What are you really afraid of?]

1992: Auf Teufel komm raus [Come Hell or High Water]

1993: Dünne Haut [Thin Skinned]

1993: Asche im Wind [Ashes in the Wind]

1994: Ich habe die Hölle gesehen [I Have Seen Hell]

1995: Zwischen Knast und Kindergarten [Between Prison and Preschool]

1996: Der Zauberer [The Sorcerers]

1998: Schmerz muss sein [Pain Is Unavoidable]

1998: Das Lied der Stille [The Song of Silence]

1999: Shivas Töchter (Tanz-Dokumentation) [Shiva's Daughters: a dance documentary]

2000: Der Auftrag [The Assignment]

2000: Der Spieler [The Player]

2001: Der Choreograph Mats Ek [Mats Ek: Choreographer]

2002: Nullen + Einsen [Zeroes + Ones]

2002: Diamanten in Kinderhand [Diamonds in the Hand of a Child]

2003: Tänze aus der verbotenen Stadt [Dances from the Forbidden City], (in co-operation with Christof Debler)

2003: Heinrich der König [King Heinrich]

2004: Wohin gehen wir, wenn wir sterben? [Where do we go when we die?]

2005: Salsa!

2005 and 2009: Meisterwerke der Menschheit[Mankind's Masterpieces], 12 episodes (producer)

2005: Waisenkinder – Wenn Eltern zu früh sterben [Orphans: when parents die too soon]

2005: Diabetes – Die Wohlstandsepidemie [Diabetes: The Epidemic of Prosperity]

2006: AVA - Die Stimme meiner Mutter [AVA - The Voice of my Mother]

2008: Mary Wigman – Die Seele des Tanzes [Mary Wigman: The Soul of Dance] (in co-operation with Christof Debler)

2008: Ich kann Dich nicht riechen [I Can't Smell You] (in co-operation with Kathrin Sonderegger)

2009: Karlheinz Stockhausen - Musik für eine bessere Welt [Karlheinz Stockhausen - Music for a Better World] (in co-operation with Thomas von Steinaecker)

2009: I am not alone (producer)

2009: Die ideale Schule, wie Migration gelingt [The Ideal School, or, How Migration Succeeds] (in co-operation with Kathrin Sonderegger)

2009: Ingo Metzmacher – Ein deutscher Dirigent [Ingo Metzmacher: a German conductor] (producer)

2010: Elvis in Las Vegas, (producer)

2010: Südafrika singt – Cape Festival der Stimmen [South Africa Sings: the Cape Festival of Voices

2010: Reise zu Tolstoi [Journey to Tolstoy] (producer)

2011: Auf den Spuren von Easy Rider [Tracking Down Easy Rider], 4 episodes, (producer)

2011: Comedy Mission, 4 episodes (producer)

2012: Sergiu Celibidache – Feuerkopf und Philosoph [Sergiu Celibidache: firebrand and philosopher]

2012: Im Bett mit Paula [In Bed with Paula], (6 episodes), (producer)

2012: John Cage – Alles ist möglich [John Cage: anything is possible], (producer)

2013: Der Chinesische Staatszirkus: Mei Li, Dokumentation [The Chinese State Circus: Mei Li, a documentary]

2014: Richard Strauss und seine Heldinnen [Richard Strauss and his Heroines], Produzent

2014: Der Spielmacher – George Tabori [The Playmaker: George Tabori]

2014: Bewegte Republik Deutschland Siebzig Jahre Kulturgeschichte [The Festive Republic of Germany: 70 years of cultural history], (4 episodes), producer

2015: Von Dada bis Gaga, 100 Jahre Performance Kunst [From Dada to Gaga: 100 years of performance art], (3 episodes)

2017: Heinrich Böll, Ansichten eines Anarchisten, Dokumentation

2018: Kubas langer Schatten der Erinnerung, Dokumentation

2019: upcoming places, Dokumentation, Israel

2019: Effi Briest oder die Elastizität des Herzens, Deutschland, Dokumentation

2020: Berlin baut ein Schloss, Deutschland, Dokumentation

2021: theater.macher.innen, Deutschland, Dokumentation, Produzent

2021: Heinrich Mann der unbekannte Rebell, Dokumentation

2021: Enrico Caruso – Die ewige Stimme, Dokumentation, Deutschland

2022: Mienenräumerinnen – Wettlauf gegen die Zeit, Dokumentation, Produzent

2022: Lakota – Lakota Leben in Nordamerika

2024: Punk Girls – Die weibliche Geschichte des britischen Punk, Dokumentation, Produzent

2024: Jesus goes to Hollywood

2025: Terrence Malick - Suche nach dem Unbekannten Dokumentation, Buch, Regie, Produzent

2025: Rudi Rabissimo, Musikdokureihe 6 Folgen, Regie

=== Short films ===
1998: Incubus

2003: Sibirien [Siberia], freely adapted from the theatre piece Sibirien by Felix Mitterer

2004: Das ist die Sehnsucht [This is Yearning], based on the poem of the same name by Rainer Maria Rilke

2006: Dichter unbekannt – Heinrich Heine [Poet Unknown: Heinrich Heine]

2007: Welcome home

=== Television programs ===
2010: NeoMusic by night, film series, (director, producer)

2010-2013: On Tape, (27 episodes), (producer)

2011: Die Show des Scheiterns [The Failure Files], (8 episodes), (Produzent)

2011–2013: ZDF Kultur Poetry Slam [ZDF Culture: Poetry Slam] (producer)

2009–2015: Arte Lounge, classical music, 30 episodes (producer)

2012–2018: Pufpaffs Happy Hour (50 episodes), (producer)

== Publications ==
2008 Matthias Film DVD Wohin gehen wir, wenn wir sterben? [Where Do We Go When We Die?]

2010 naxos video library Great voices of South Africa

2012 Arthaus DVD Sergiu Celibidache Firebrand and Philosopher

2014 Arthaus DVD Richard Strauss and his Heroines

2014 Arthaus DVD Mary Wigman: The soul of dance

2015 Filmsortiement Die ideale Schule - Wie Integration gelingt[The Ideal School: How Integration Succeeds]
