= Erbach Palace =

Palace in Erbach im Odenwald, Germany

Coordinates: 49°39′26″N 8°59′33″E

Main building

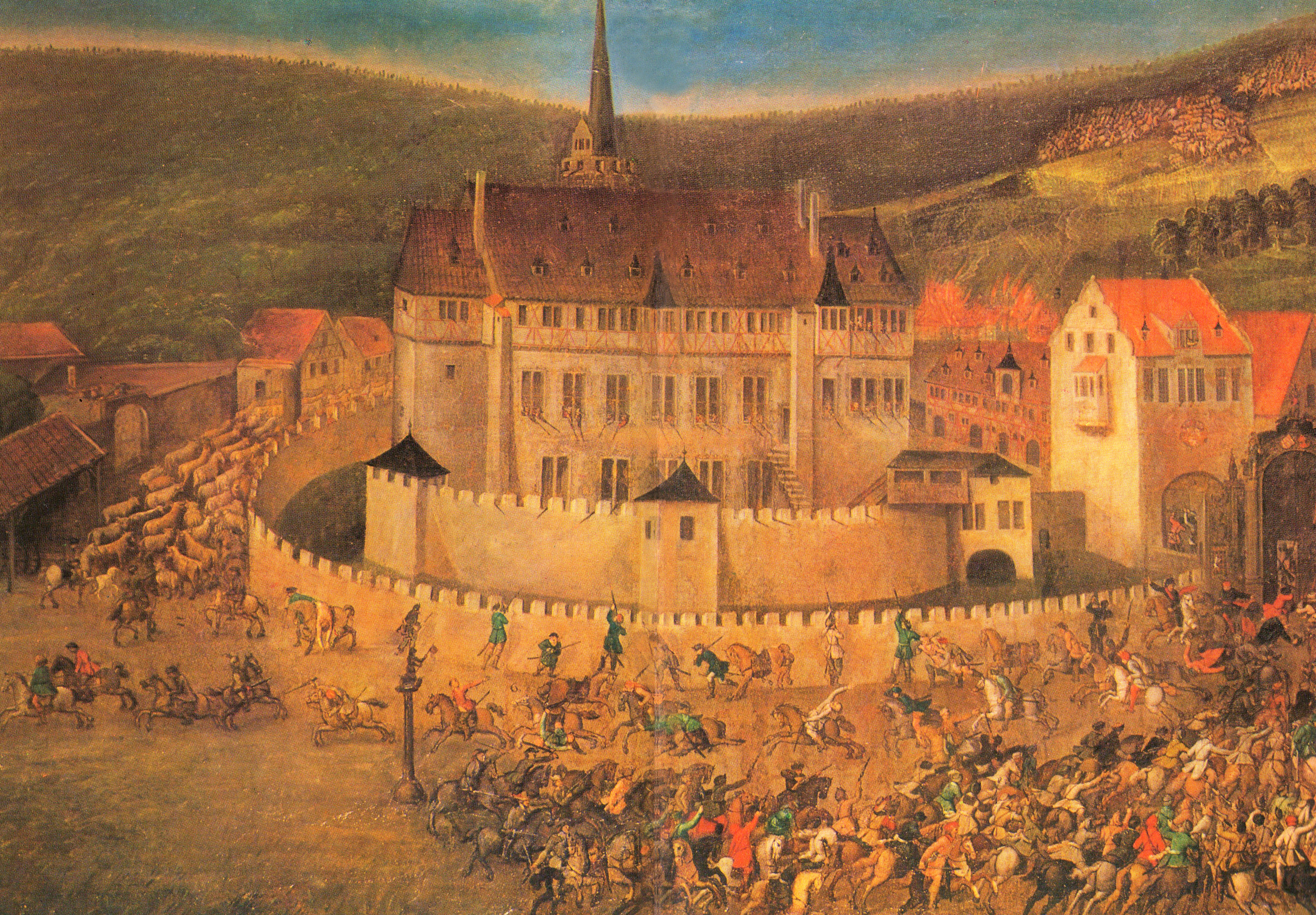
The palace in 1623

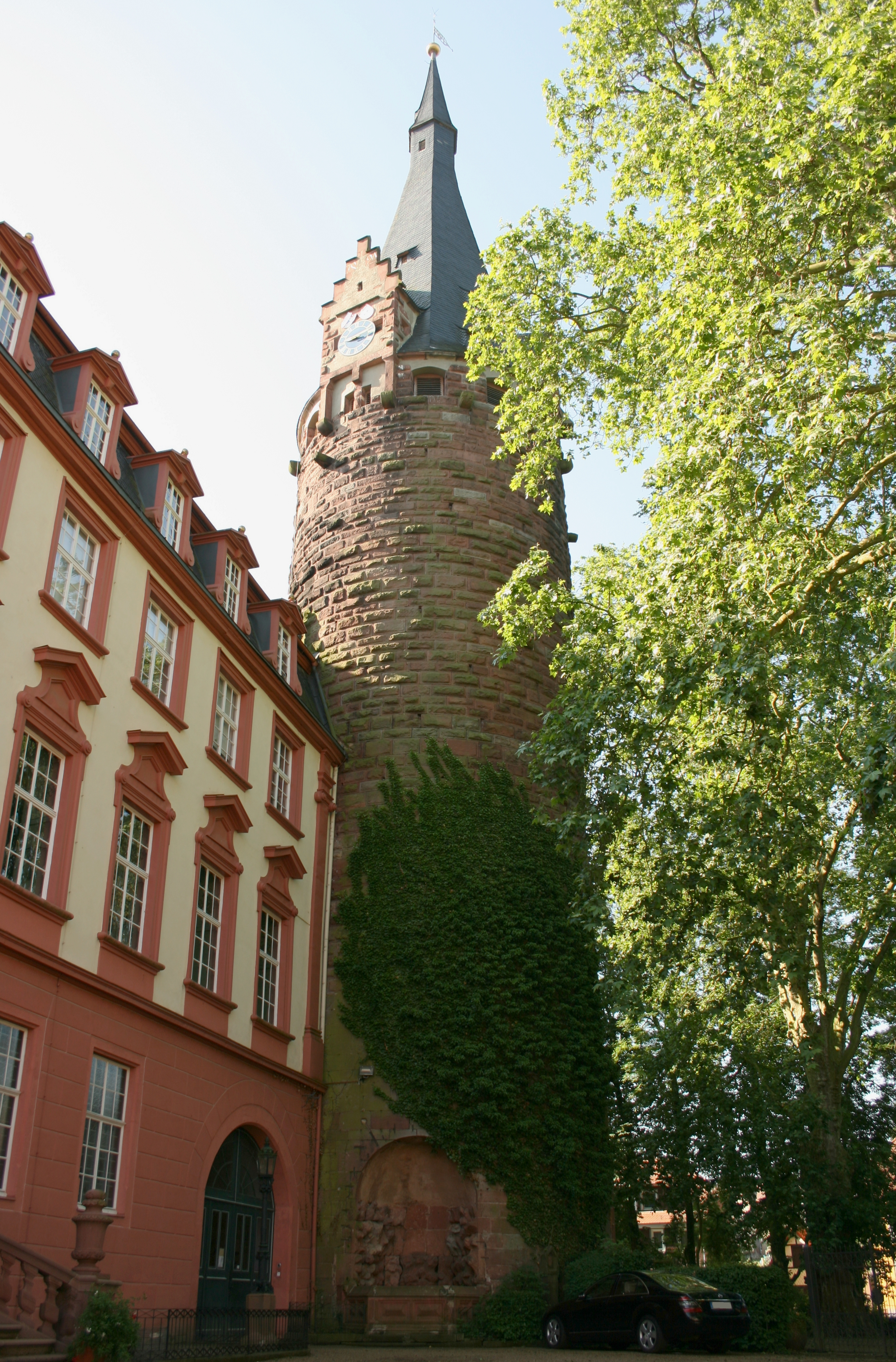
The keep of the palace

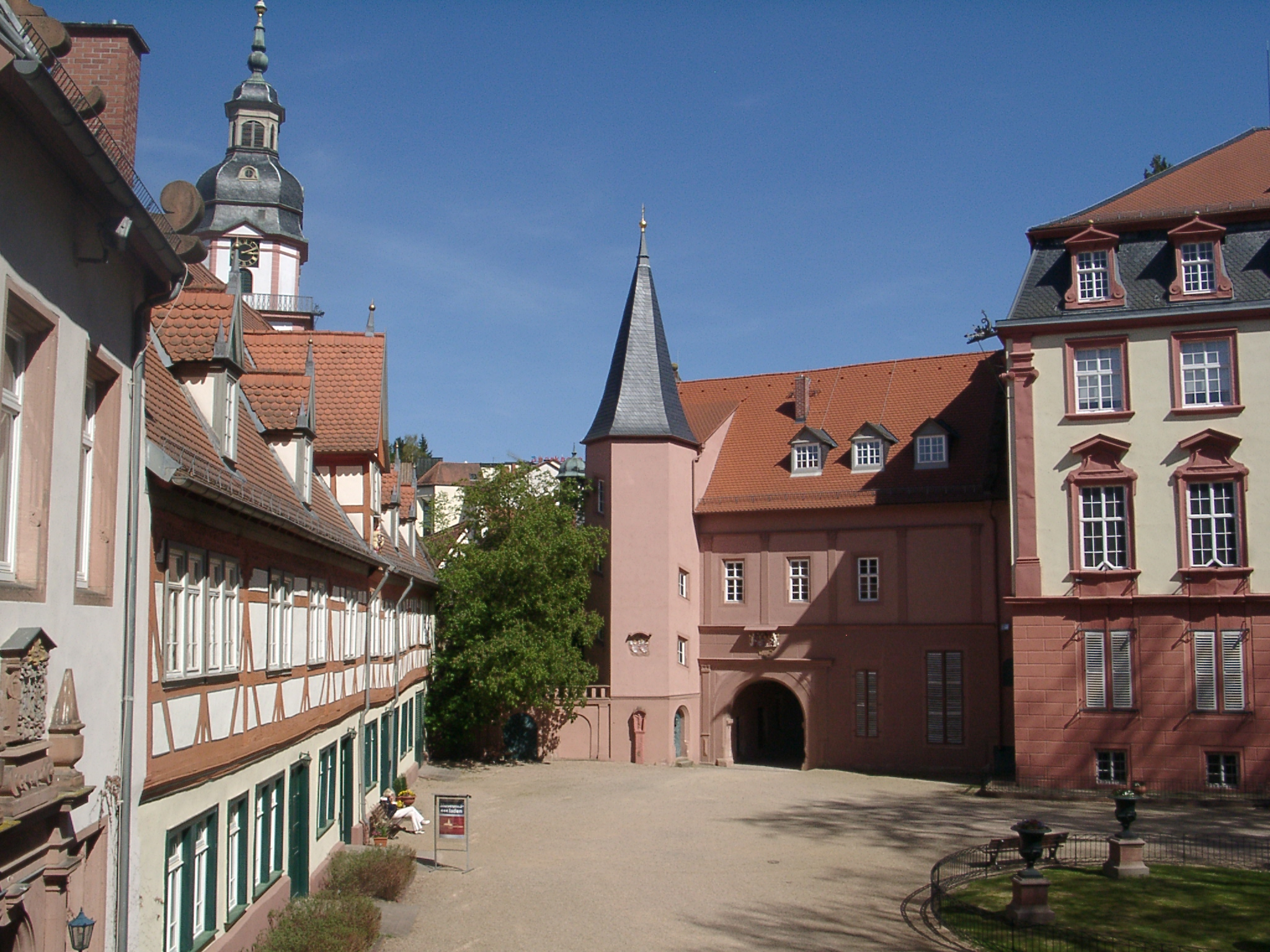
The archives building

Erbach Palace is a palace in Erbach im Odenwald and the seat of the Count of Erbach. It was originally built in the Middle Ages, but most of the buildings today date back to the early 18th century. The palace houses the extensive antique collection of Franz, Count of Erbach-Erbach.

== History ==
The oldest historical record about the building was from the 12th century. The rulers of Erbach, likely Count Gerhard I, built the first castle in the 13th century. Between 1500 and 1530, the castle was rebuilt in the Renaissance style.

The County of Erbach became an Imperial state within the Franconian Circle in 1532. Erbach-Breuberg partitioned from Erbach in 1647. In 1717 Erbach was divided into Erbach-Erbach, Erbach-Fürstenau, and Erbach-Schönberg (Schönberg near Bensheim). 1806 the counties were mediatised. In 1818 the counts of Erbach-Erbach inherited the County of Wartenberg-Roth. The present Count of Erbach-Erbach is still living at Erbach Palace and his nearby Eulbach hunting lodge. The Counts of Erbach-Fürstenau are living at Fürstenau Castle.

== Literature ==
- Magnus Backes: Hessen – Handbuch der deutschen Kunstdenkmäler. 2. Aufl. 1982, S. 207f.
- Wolfram Becher: Michelstadt und Erbach – zwei romantische Städte im Odenwald. Hermann Emig. Amorbach 1980.
- Klaus Fittschen: Katalog der antiken Skulpturen in Schloss Erbach = Archäologische Forschungen 3. Berlin 1977.
