= Franz, Count of Erbach-Erbach =

German nobleman and art collector

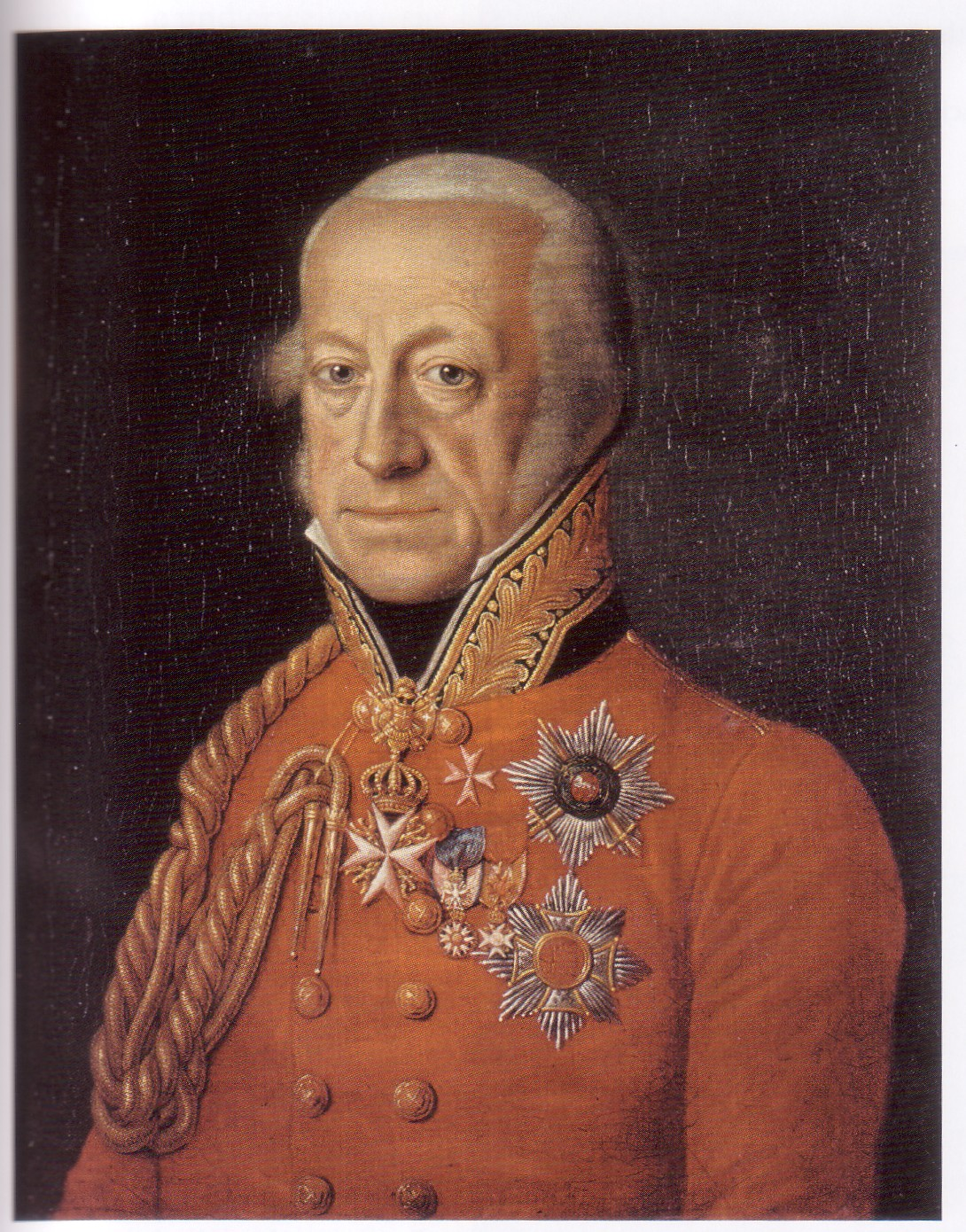
Franz I. Graf zu Erbach-Erbach

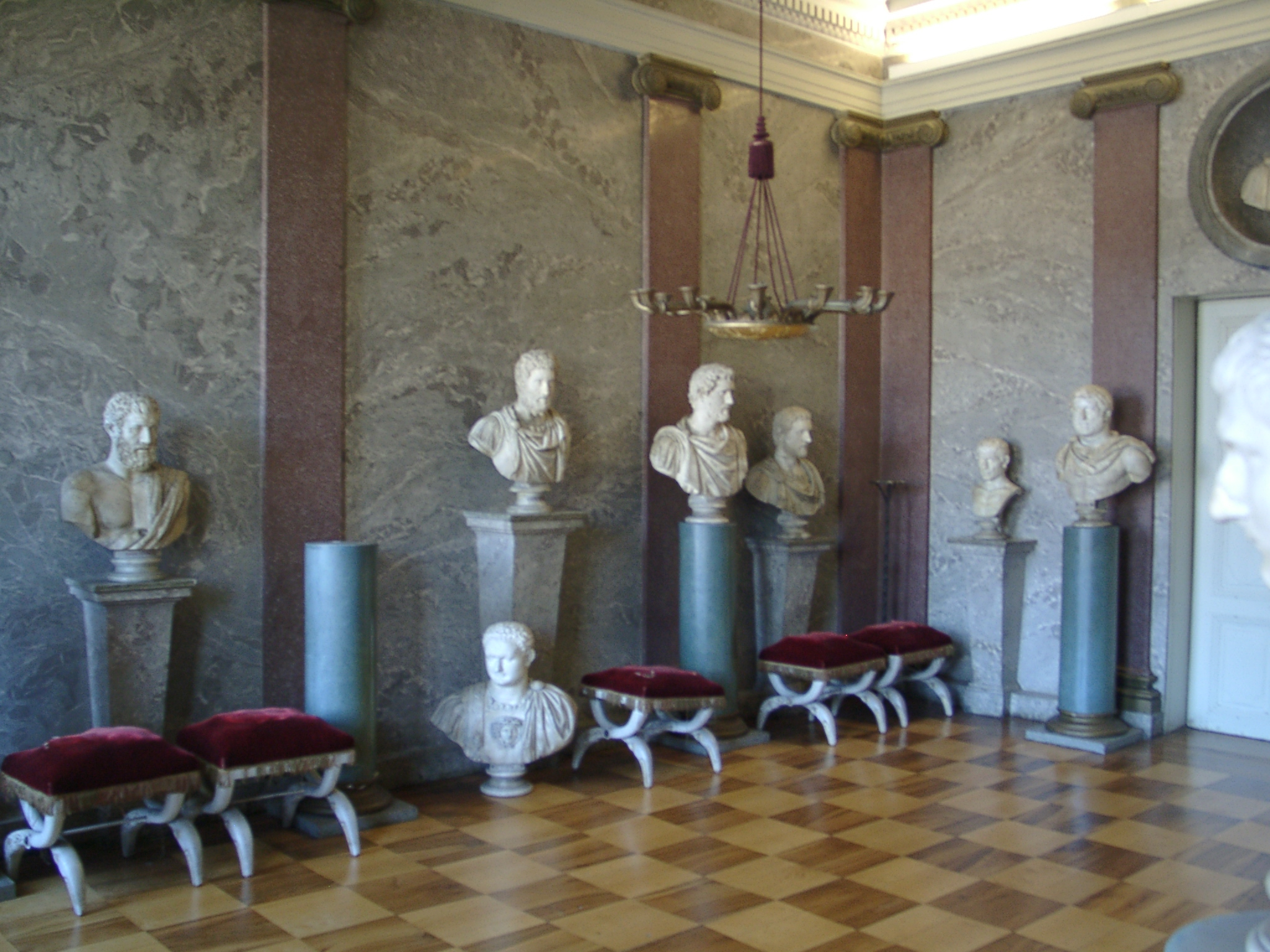
Antique collection in the Erbach Palace

Franz Graf zu Erbach-Erbach (29 October 1754 – 8 March 1823) was a German nobleman and art collector.

== Early life ==
Franz was born in Erbach im Odenwald in 1754 as the only son of Count Georg Wilhelm von Erbach-Erbach-Reichenberg (1686-1757) and his second wife, Countess Leopoldine zu Salm-Grumbach (1731-1795). He had one surviving half-sister Sophie Christine, Princess von Nassau-Saarbrücken (1725-1795) from his father's previous marriage to Countess Sophie Charlotte von Bothmer (1697-1748).

== Biography ==
From 1769 to 1773, he studied politics and history in Lausanne, Strasbourg, and Paris. He also traveled extensively to London, Brussels, The Hague, Berlin, Dresden, and Italy. While he was in Rome, he met several people that would become influential in his life, among them Ennio Quirino Visconti and Johann Friedrich Reiffenstein.

As the Count of Erbach, he paid special attention to agriculture, trade, and transportation. Through the influences of Reiffenstein and Visconti, Franz started his own art collection. This collection is now housed by the Erbach Palace. Franz dedicated his completed art catalogue to Reiffenstein. He was also the pioneer of ivory carving in Erbach, and his ivory collection now belongs to the German Ivory Museum Erbach. He died at Erbach in 1823.

== Marriages and issue ==
He married firstly Charlotte Luise Polyxena, Countess zu Leiningen (1755-1785) and had children:

- Charlotte Auguste Wilhelmine (1777-1846) ⚭ Prince Carl I von Isenburg-Birstein (1766-1820)
- Marianne Luise Friederike Karoline (1778-1797), died unmarried
- Karoline Luise Wilhelmine (1779-1825) ⚭ Count Joseph Karl zu Ortenburg-Tambach (1780-1836)
- Luise Charlotte Polyxena (1781-1830) ⚭ Count Friedrich Christoph von Degenfeld-Schonburg (1769-1848)
- Karl zu Erbach-Erbach (1782-1832) ⚭ Countess Anna Sophie zu Erbach-Fürstenau (1796-1845)
- Auguste Karoline (1783-1833) ⚭ Count Friedrich II Magnus zu Solms-Wildenfels (1777-1857)
- Franz Georg Friedrich Christian Eginhard (1785-1854), adopted as Count von Wartenberg by his stepmothers brother, the last reigning Count, Ludwig Kolb von Wartenberg (1752-1818)

After the death of his first wife, Franz married again, to her first cousin, Countess Luise Polyxena Charlotte Kolb von Wartenberg (1755-1844), widow of his cousin Count Friedrich August zu Erbach-Fürstenau (1754-1784) and daughter of Count Friedrich Karl Kolb von Wartenberg (1725-1784) and his wife, Countess Karoline Polyxene zu Leiningen-Dagsburg-Hartenburg (1728-1782). This marriage remained childless.

== Literature ==
- L. Ferdinand Dieffenbach: Graf Franz zu Erbach-Erbach. Ein Lebens- und Culturbild aus dem Ende des XVIII. und dem Anfange des XIX. Jahrhunderts. Darmstadt 1879
- Wolfgang Glüber: Franz I. und der Rittersaal im Schloss zu Erbach. In: Kunst in Hessen und am Mittelrhein. NF 2, 2006, S. 35-62
- Brita von Götz-Mohr: „Amico optimo“. Franz Graf zu Erbach-Erbach (1754–1823), Johann Friedrich Reiffenstein (1719–1793) und die Antikensammlungen in Erbach im Odenwald. 2006
