= Mümling =

River in Germany

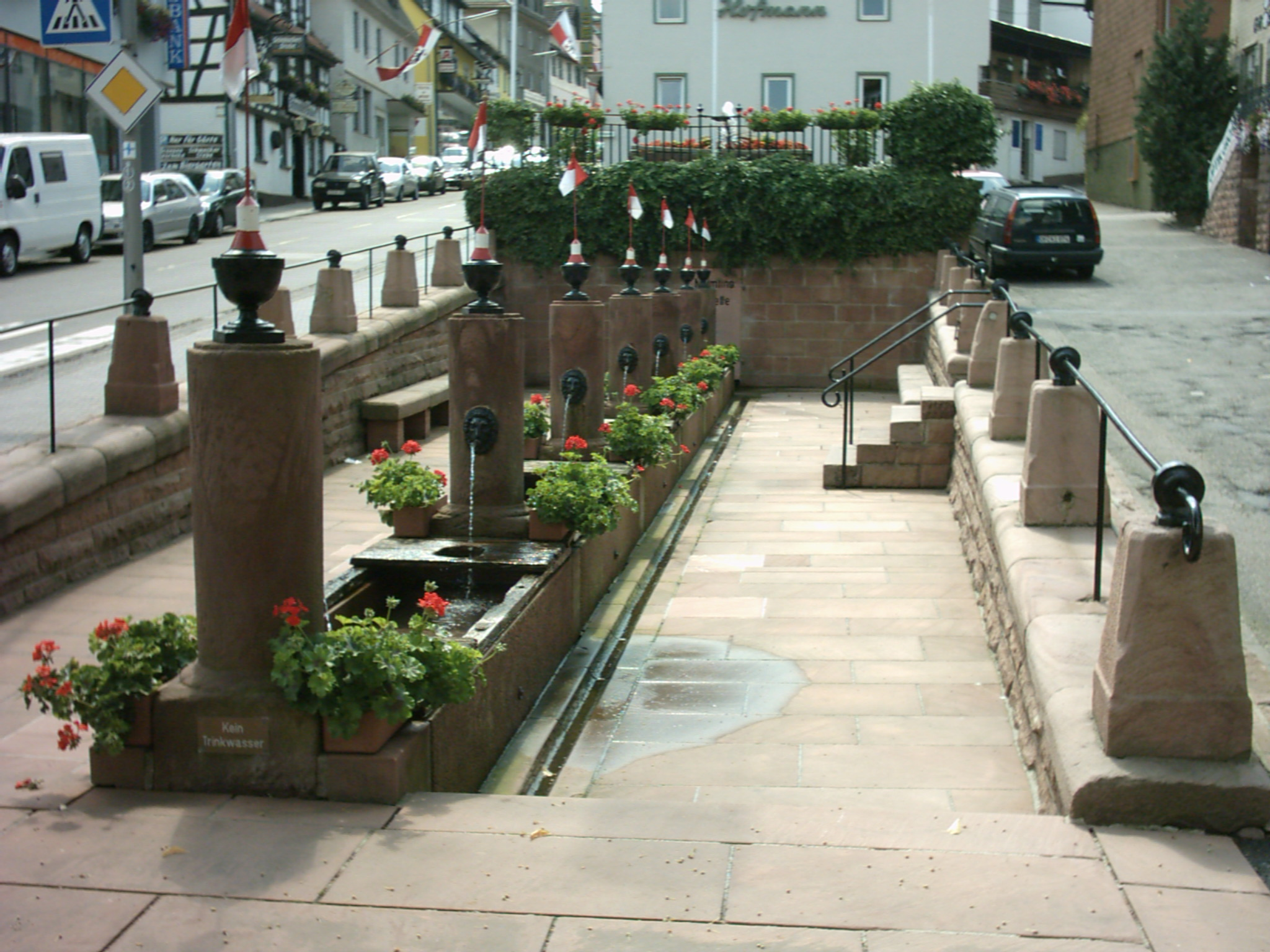
- Mümling source, Beerfelden

Location
- Country: Germany
- States: Hesse and Bavaria
- Reference no.: DE: 2474

Physical characteristics
- Source
  - location: Zwölf-Röhrenbrunnen in Beerfelden, Odenwald
  - coordinates: 49°34′06″N 8°58′31″E
  - elevation: 400 m above sea level (NN)
- Mouth
  - location: Obernburg
  - coordinates: 49°49′54″N 9°08′38″E
  - elevation: 117 m above sea level (NN)
- Length: 49.2 km (30.6 mi)
- Basin size: 377.35 km^{2}
- Discharge
  - location: (at the border to Bavaria)
  - average: 3.7205 m³/s
  - minimum: Average low: 1.3394 m³/s

Basin features
- Progression: Main→ Rhine→ North Sea
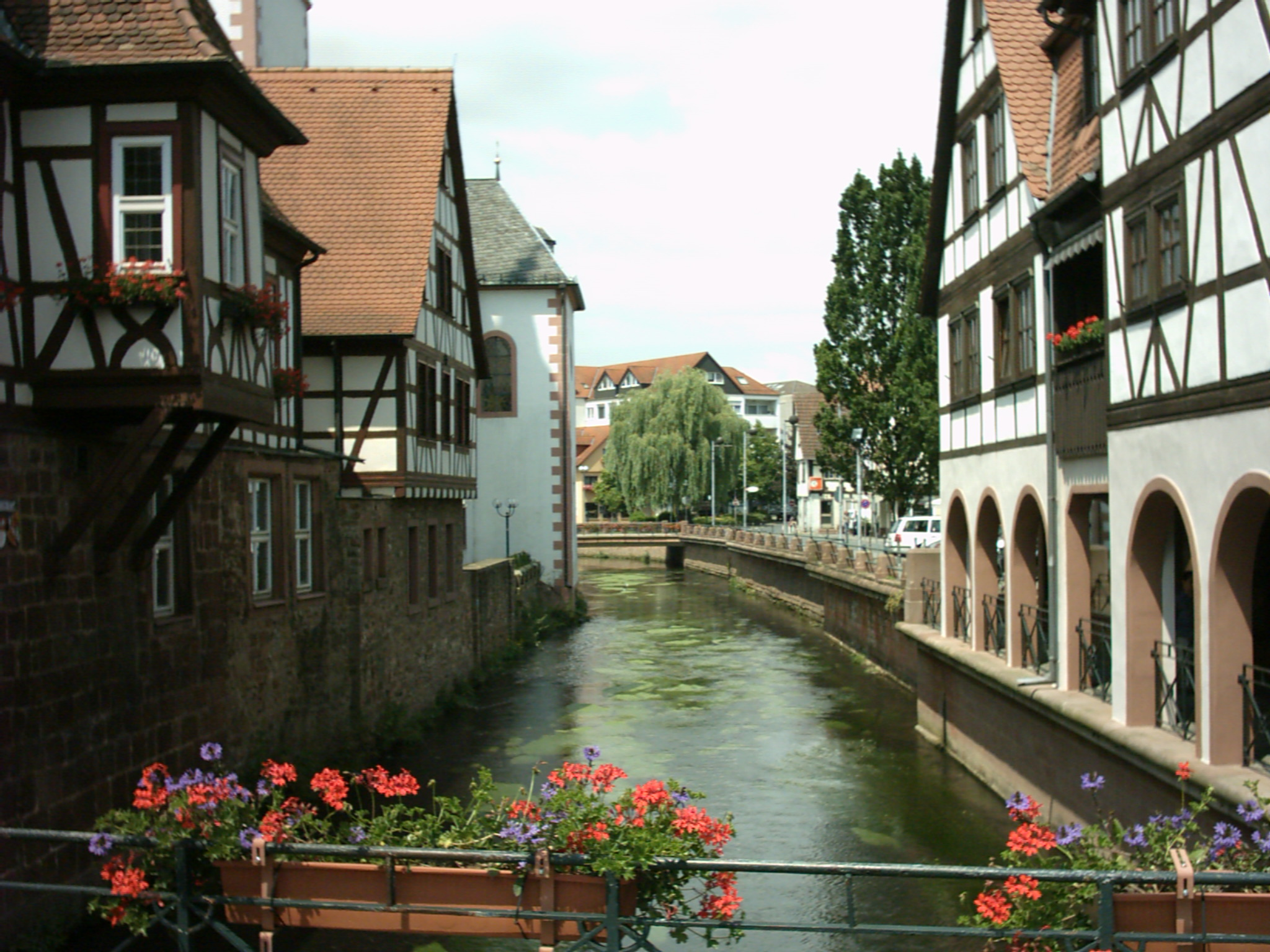
- Mümling

The Mümling is a river of Hesse and Bavaria, Germany. It is 49.7 kilometres (30.9 mi) long and lends its name to the Mümlingtal (Mümling valley) in Odenwald. In Bavaria it is sometimes called Mömling in official documents. It is a left tributary of the Main.

== Etymology ==
The Romans named this river Nemaninga, and after it the Numerus Brittonum et exploratorum Nemaningensium unit in Obernburg. In the 9th century, this river was first mentioned with the name Mimininga. The name Mümling probably belongs to the so-called "pra-european hydronyms" as a twin-form of Neman River.

== Cities near Mümling ==
- Beerfelden
- Erbach
- Michelstadt
- Zell im Odenwald
- Bad König
- Mümling-Grumbach
- Höchst im Odenwald
- Breuberg
- Mömlingen
- Eisenbach (Unterfranken)
- Obernburg

== See also ==
- List of rivers of Bavaria
- List of rivers of Hesse
