= Überwald =

Coordinates: 49.5833°N 08.8166°E

The Überwald is a wooded area in the southeast of Bergstraße district in Hesse, Germany, between the "Anterior" and "Hinder" Odenwald, comprising the communities of Abtsteinach, Grasellenbach and Wald-Michelbach. Wald-Michelbach is the Überwald's central community. The name was likely first used by the inhabitants of the neighbouring Weschnitz valley. The direction of view from this valley goes over the higher elevation at the Tromm, "over the forest" (über den Wald in German) towards the higher-lying places Wald-Michelbach, Abtsteinach and Grasellenbach.

The places lying in the Überwald from Abtsteinach to Grasellenbach are Unter-Abtsteinach, Ober-Abtsteinach, Mackenheim, Siedelsbrunn, Kreidach, Stallenkandel, Ober-Mengelbach, Gadern, Wald-Michelbach, Ober-Schönmattenwag, Unter-Schönmattenwag, Aschbach, Hartenrod, Affolterbach, Kocherbach, Wahlen, Scharbach, Tromm (a place as well as a hill), Litzelbach, Hammelbach and Gras-Ellenbach.

== Neighbouring communities ==
The places neighbouring the Überwald are Gorxheimertal (Bergstraße district), Heiligkreuzsteinach (Baden-Württemberg), Schönau (Baden-Württemberg), Birkenau (Bergstraße district), Mörlenbach (Bergstraße district), Rimbach (Bergstraße district), Heddesbach (Baden-Württemberg), Eberbach (Baden-Württemberg), Rothenberg (Odenwaldkreis), Fürth (Bergstraße district), Mossautal (Odenwaldkreis), Reichelsheim (Odenwaldkreis) and Beerfelden (Odenwaldkreis).
