= Wald-Michelbach =

- Municipality
- Coat of arms

- Location of Wald-Michelbach within Bergstraße district
- Interactive map of Wald-Michelbach
- Location within Germany Location within Hesse
- Coordinates: 49°34′N 8°50′E
- Country: Germany
- State: Hesse
- Admin. region: Darmstadt
- District: Bergstraße

Government
  - Mayor (2023–29): Sascha Weber (SPD)

Area
  - Total: 74.36 km^{2} (28.71 sq mi)
- Elevation: 343 m (1,125 ft)

Population (2025-12-31)
  - Total: 10,445
  - Density: 140.5/km^{2} (363.8/sq mi)
- Time zone: UTC+01:00 (CET)
  - Summer (DST): UTC+02:00 (CEST)
- Postal codes: 69483
- Dialling codes: 06207
- Vehicle registration: HP
- Website: www.wald-michelbach.de

Wald-Michelbach is a municipality in the Bergstraße district in Hesse, Germany.

== Geography ==
=== Location ===
The community lies in the Odenwald, 12 km east of Weinheim. The now disused Überwaldbahn (railway) runs through Wald-Michelbach.

=== Geology ===
→ Odenwald#Geology

=== Hardberg ===
In the area of Wald-Michelbach's outlying centre of Siedelsbrunn is found the Hardberg, at 593 m above sea level the Odenwald's third highest mountain. On the Hardberg's peak is a 135 m-tall Hessischer Rundfunk radio and television transmission mast. From each side of the Hardberg there is a unique view over the Odenwald and the Rhine valley.

=== Neighbouring communities ===
Wald-Michelbach borders in the north on the community of Grasellenbach, in the east on the community of Mossautal, the town of Beerfelden and the community of Rothenberg (all three in the Odenwaldkreis), in the south on the town of Eberbach (outlying centre of Brombach) and the communities of Heddesbach and Heiligkreuzsteinach (all three in the Rhein-Neckar-Kreis in Baden-Württemberg) and in the west on the communities of Abtsteinach, Mörlenbach and Rimbach.

=== Constituent communities ===
Wald-Michelbach's Ortsteile are Siedelsbrunn, Gadern, Affolterbach, Kreidach, Aschbach, Ober-Schönmattenwag, Unter-Schönmattenwag, Hartenrod, Kocherbach, Ober-Mengelbach, Stallenkandel and Wald-Michelbach

== Development of municipal area ==
=== Amalgamations ===
On 1 December 1970, Hartenrod was amalgamated with Wald-Michelbach. Gadern and Kreidach followed on 1 January 1971 and Aschbach on 1 October of the same year. On 1 January 1972, Siedelsbrunn, Ober-Schönmattenwag and Unter-Schönmattenwag became parts of Wald-Michelbach, with Affolterbach and Kocherbach joining them on 1 August 1972.

== Politics ==
=== Community council ===
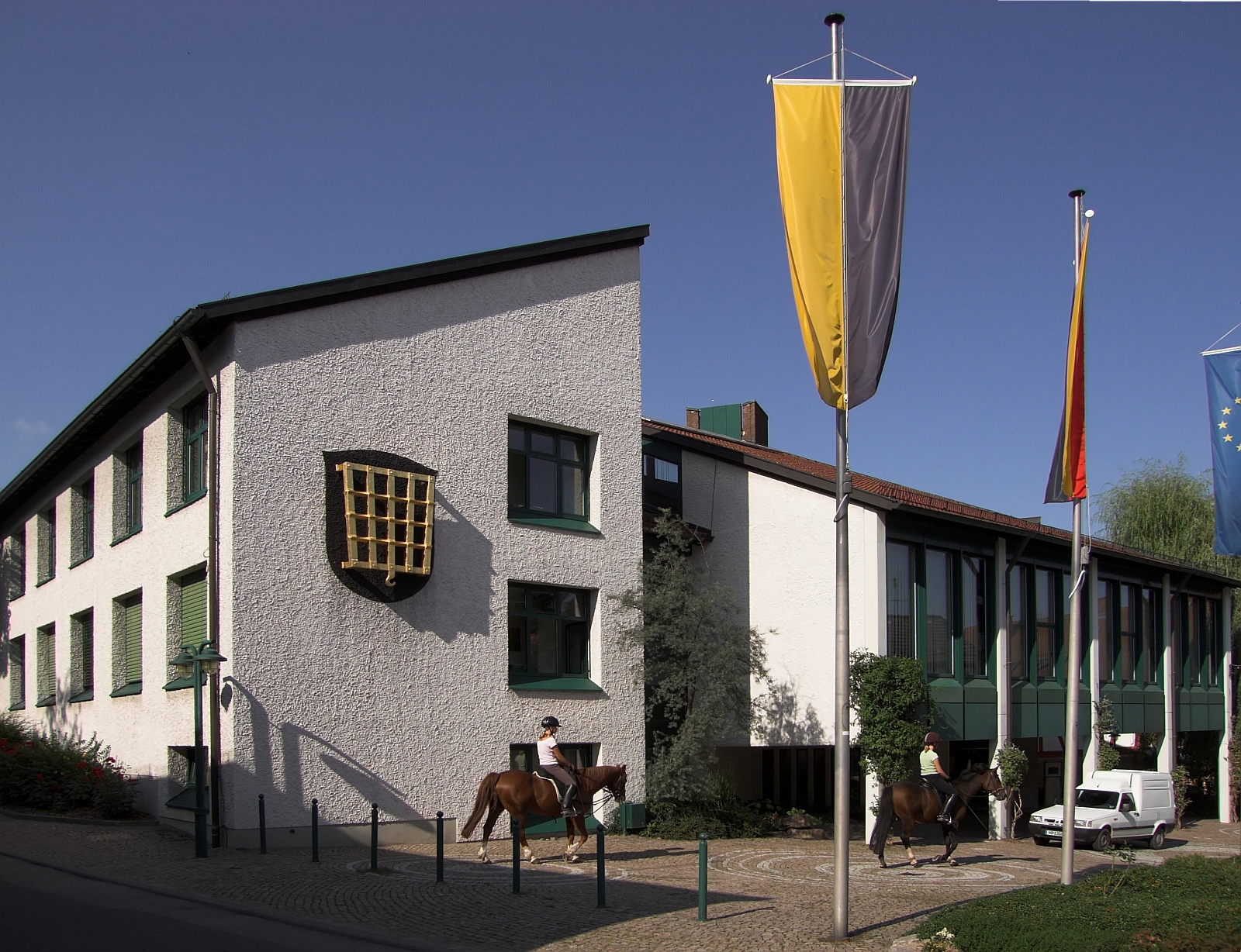
Town Hall in the heart of the community

The municipal election held on 26 March 2006 yielded the following results:

Parties and voter communities		% 2006	Seats; 2006	% 2001	Seats; 2001
CDU	Christian Democratic Union of Germany	38.9	14	37.3	14
SPD	Social Democratic Party of Germany	34.1	13	37.3	14
GREENS	Bündnis 90/Die Grünen	6.0	2	4.0	2
FDP	Free Democratic Party	2.1	1	1.1	0
FW	Freie Wählervereinigung	9.1	3	9.9	4
AKB	Affolterbach-Kocherbacher-Bürgervereinigung	9.9	4	9.3	3
Die Tierschutzpartei	The Animal Welfare Party	–	–	1.1	0
Total		100.0	37	100.0	37
Voter turnout in %		46.3		53.0	

=== Mayor ===
Since July 2017, the community's mayor has been Sascha Weber.

=== Town partnerships ===
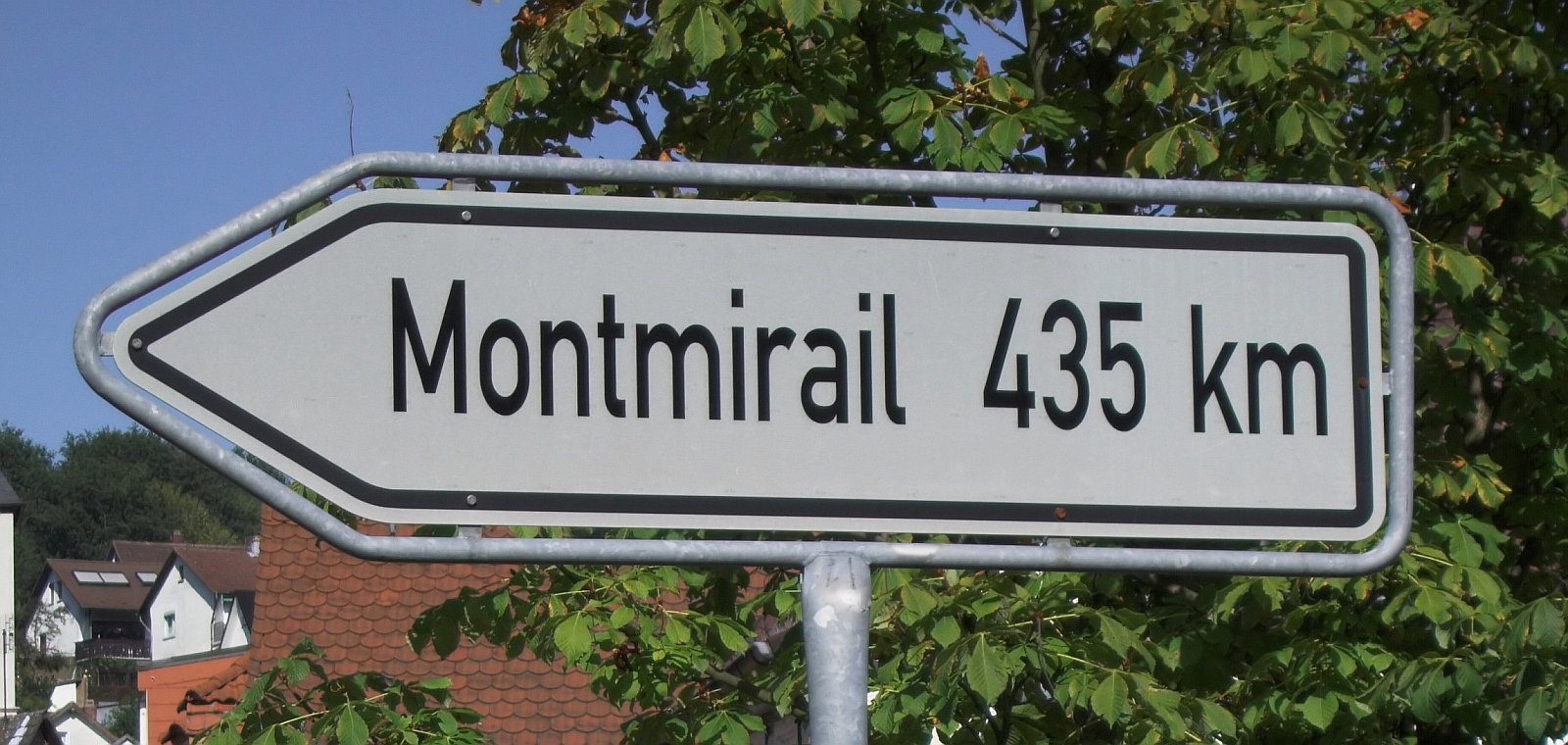
Signpost in Wald-Michelbach pointing the way to Montmirail

- Montmirail, Marne, France
- Hassocks, West Sussex, England, United Kingdom

== Economy ==
The community's and surrounding area's biggest employer is the firm Coronet (household appliances).

== Education ==
Wald-Michelbach has at its disposal two primary schools, one special school, one Hauptschule-Realschule and one Gymnasium. Since 2007 there has also been an open private school based on Maria Montessori’s methodology.

=== Main community ===
- Adam-Karrillon-Schule (primary school)
- Mary-Anne-Kübel-Schule (school for pupils with learning difficulties)
- Eugen-Bachmann-Schule (Haupt- und Realschule)
- Überwald-Gymnasium
- Drachenschule Odenwald - open school (1st to 6th class)

=== Outlying centres ===
- Grundschule Unter-Schönmattenwag (primary school)

== Leisure and sport facilities ==
Wald-Michelbach has an outdoor swimming pool that was renovated in 2003. Furthermore, the community has at its disposal an artificial-turf football pitch, which in 2000 replaced the former cinder pitch. It is used by SG Wald-Michelbach and SV Eintracht Wald-Michelbach. There is also a sport hall used by both men and women team handball players from SG Wald-Michelbach and TV 02 Siedelsbrunn as well as the ÜSC Wald-Michelbach women volleyball players.

== Culture and sightseeing ==
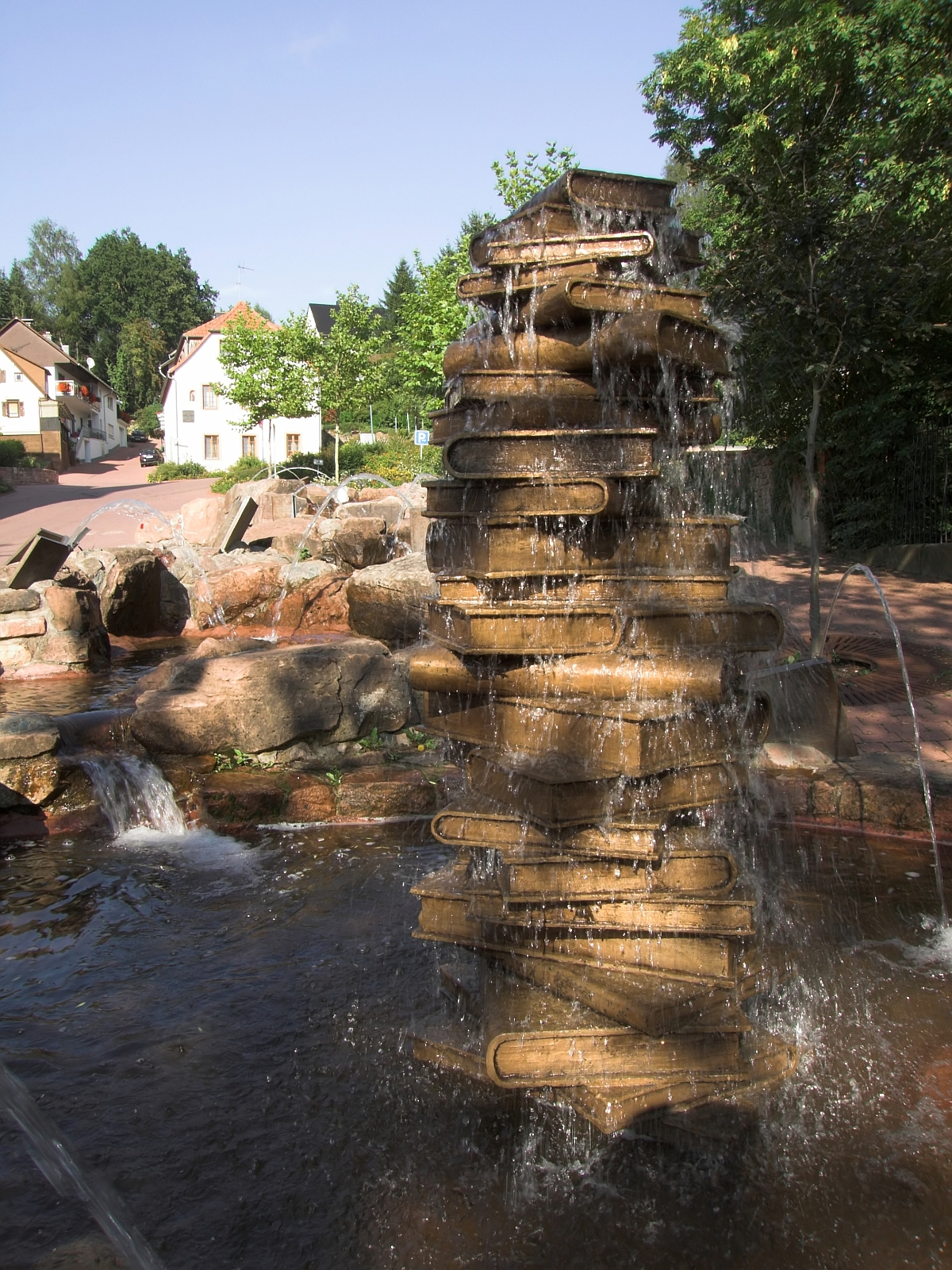
Bücherbrunnen

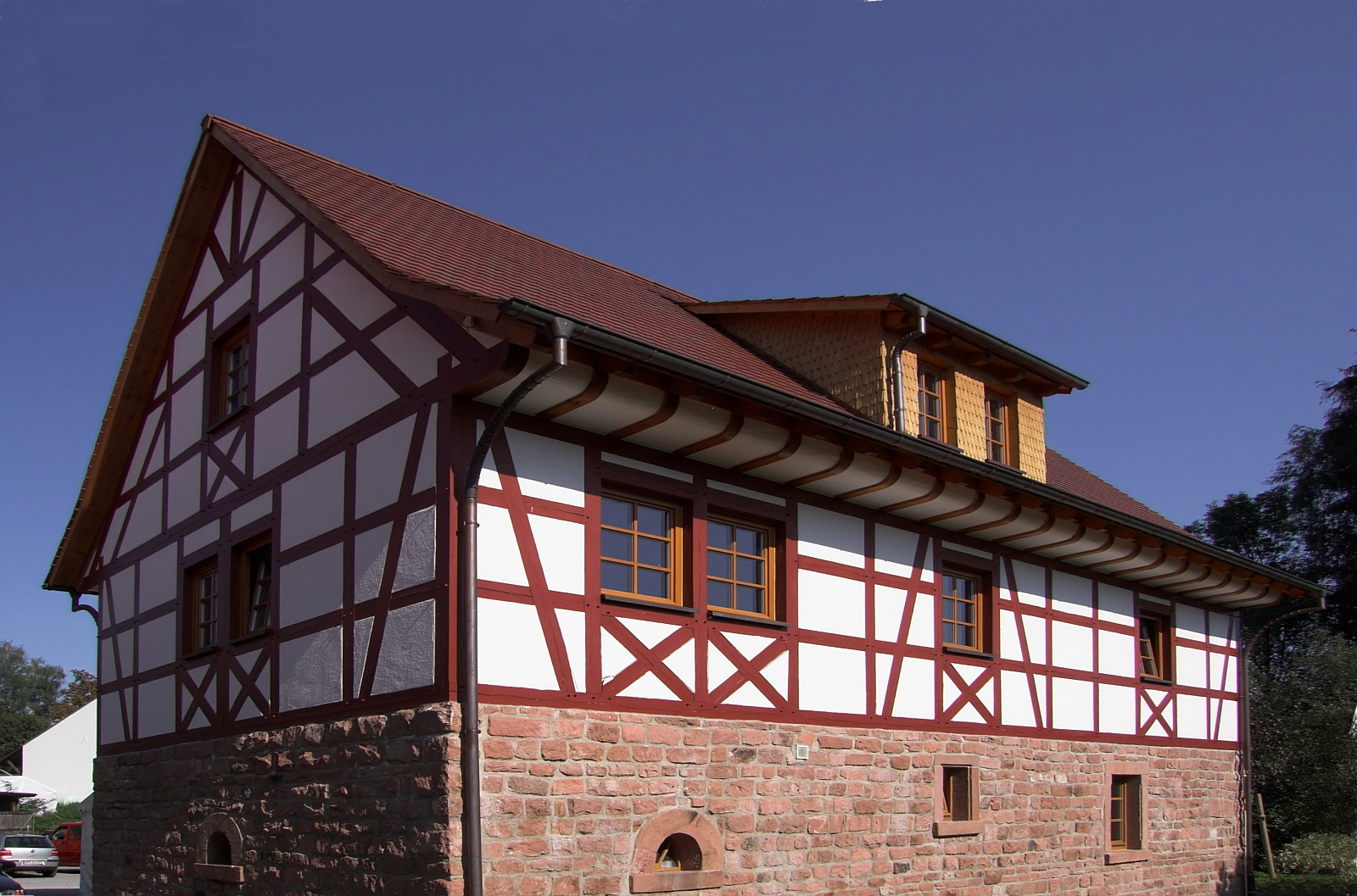
Einhaus (back)

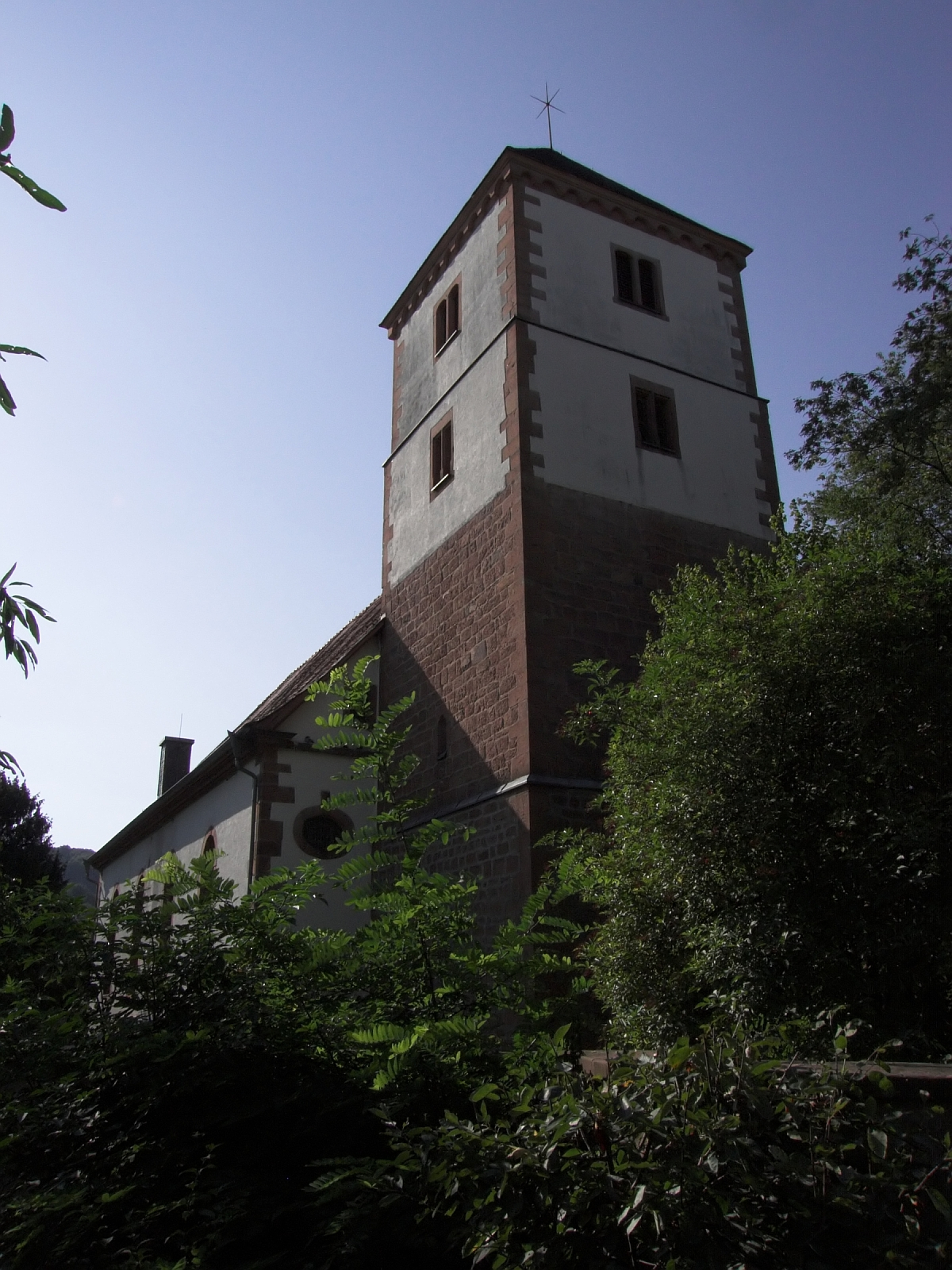
Evangelical church

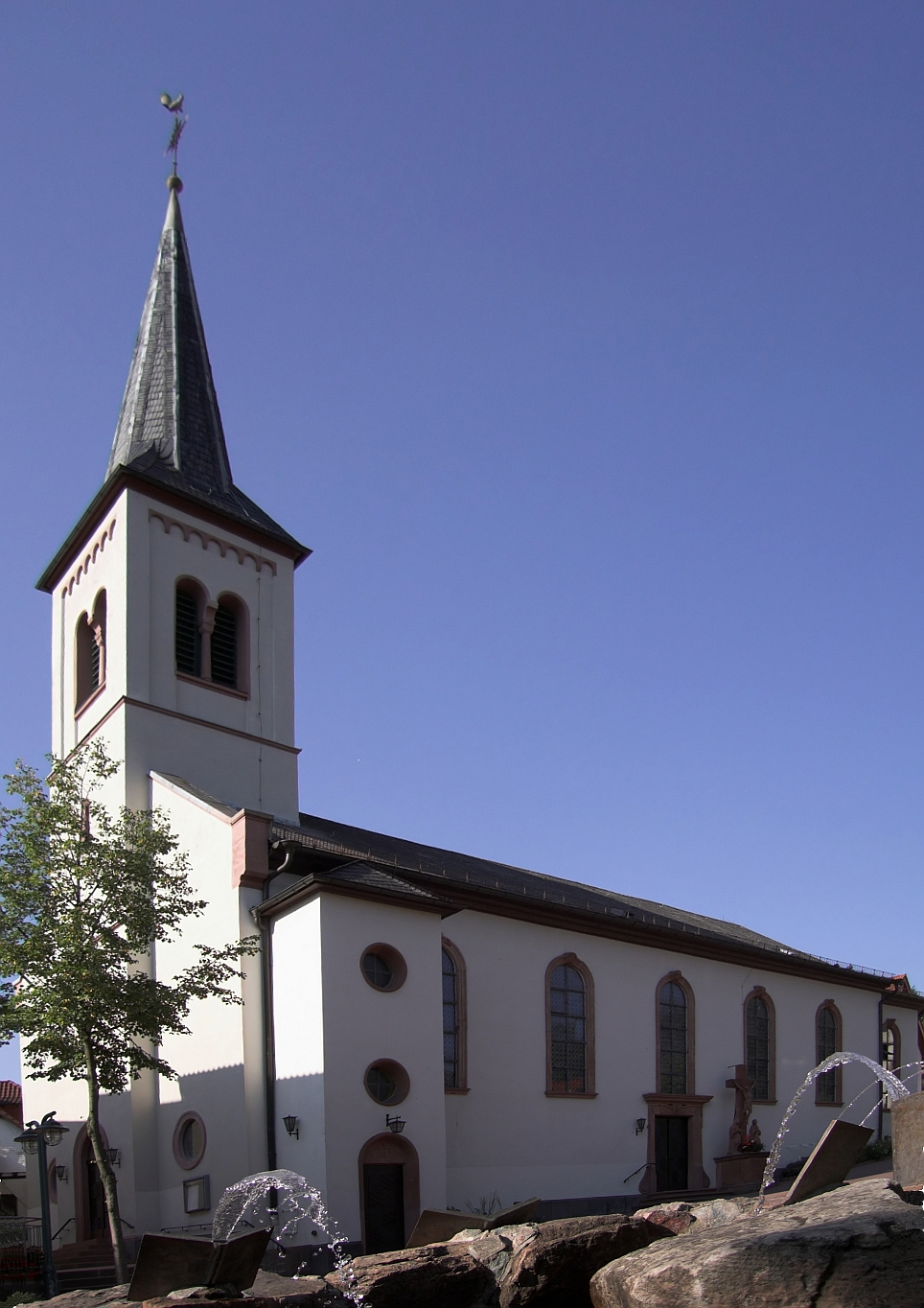
Catholic church

=== Libraries ===
==== Library at the Überwald-Gymnasium ====
In autumn 2007, the Überwald-Gymnasium opened its new library MIZ (Medien- und Infozentrum – “Media and Infocentre”). This may be used not only by students, but as of April 2008 also by all citizens of the surrounding municipalities.

=== Museums ===
==== Heimatmuseum ====
The Heimatmuseum (local history museum) has been housed since 1988 at the old town hall (Altes Rathaus) right in the heart of the community. The building was built in 1594. On display here are not only items from Wald-Michelbach's historical development but sometimes also special exhibits.

==== Stoewermuseum ====
The Stoewermuseum was opened in 2002 and is housed in the building that formerly housed the old savings bank, near the heart of the community. On show here is a collection of products from the Stoewer works in Stettin (now Szczecin, Poland). The museum's centrepiece is the array of cars on display on the ground floor. Most have been restored and are in operating condition. Furthermore, more of the Stoewer company's products, such as sewing machines, typewriters and bicycles, can also be seen. The museum is run privately by a collector who was born in Stettin. In 2005, in honour of the owner and his dedication, a street in the main community was christened Stoewerstraße. It is planned to move the Stoewermuseum back to its origins in Stettin (Szczecin), Poland.

=== Buildings ===
The Überwälder Einhaus was completed in 2005 by the Überwälder Museums- und Kulturverein (“Überwald Museum and Culture Club”) and unpaid help. The name Einhaus (“Onehouse”) refers to how such buildings were formerly used: a single building contained a dwelling, a storage cellar, a stable and a barn. Today, though, this one houses a civil wedding venue and a sizeable multipurpose room used by the community's clubs for social occasions. In 2006, the Bücherbrunnen (“Book Fountain”) was also built before the Einhaus. On that spot, until the 19th century, when it was torn down, once stood a town tower in which, in Adam Karrillon’s novel Michael Hely was the hero’s home. The books displayed at the fountain are meant to remind one of the spot’s literary importance.

=== Regular events ===
- Fumaba
- Gassenmarkt (“Lane Market”)
- Heimatfest (“Homeland Festival”, first weekend in July)
- Kerwe (church consecration festival, next to last Sunday in August)
- Kommunales Kino (“Municipal Cinema”, second Saturday each month)
- Weihnachtsmarkt (“Christmas Market”)

== Healthcare ==
On the Hardberg's slope in outlying centre of Siedelsbrunn lies the Buddhist monastery "Buddhas Weg" ("Way of Buddha"). It offers a variety of traditional Chinese and Vietnamese therapies as well as spiritual seminars.

The "Systelios" clinic for people suffering from the Burnout syndrome is also located in Siedelsbrunn.

== Famous people ==
=== Sons and daughters of the town ===
- Adam Karrillon (1853–1938), writer and physician (honorary citizen 1921)
- Lothar Mark (1945– ), SPD politician
- Heinrich Schlerf (1890–1970), founder of the Coronet works
- Dr. Rudolf Wünzer (1862–1929), honorary citizen: 16 September 1913
- Karl Kübel (1909–2006), founder of the Karl Kübel-Stiftung.
- Eugen Bachmann (1913–1975), Member of the Landtag (CDU) and former mayor of Wald-Michelbach (1948–1975)
- Gisela Winckler (1966- ), climate scientist and geochemist

=== Others ===
- Jürgen Gerlach, National Chairman of The Animal Welfare Party
