= Güttersbach =

Güttersbach may refer to:

- Güttersbach (Crumbach), a river of Hesse, Germany, tributary of the Crumbach
- Güttersbach (Mossautal), a constituent community of Mossautal, Hesse, Germany
