= Rimbach, Hesse =

Rimbach (Odenwald)
- Municipality
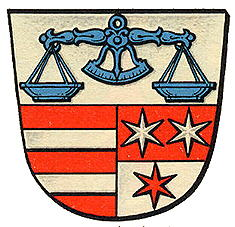
- Coat of arms

- Location of Rimbach (Odenwald) within Bergstraße district
- Interactive map of Rimbach (Odenwald)
- Location within Germany Location within Hesse
- Coordinates: 49°37′24″N 8°45′36″E
- Country: Germany
- State: Hesse
- Admin. region: Darmstadt
- District: Bergstraße

Government
  - Mayor (2024–30): Holger Schmitt

Area
  - Total: 23.16 km^{2} (8.94 sq mi)
- Elevation: 174 m (571 ft)

Population (2025-12-31)
  - Total: 8,688
  - Density: 375.1/km^{2} (971.6/sq mi)
- Time zone: UTC+01:00 (CET)
  - Summer (DST): UTC+02:00 (CEST)
- Postal codes: 64666–64668
- Dialling codes: 06253
- Vehicle registration: HP
- Website: www.rimbach-odw.de

Rimbach (German pronunciation: [ˈʁɪmbax]) in the Odenwald is a municipality in the Bergstraße district in southern Hesse, Germany.

== Geography ==
=== Location ===
The community lies in the Odenwald some 30 km north of Heidelberg and about 35 km northeast of Mannheim. It is found on Bundesstraße 38, and through it flows the Weschnitz.

=== Neighbouring communities ===
Rimbach borders in the north on the community of Fürth, in the east on the community of Grasellenbach, in the southeast on the community of Wald-Michelbach, in the south on the community of Mörlenbach and in the west on the town of Heppenheim.

=== Constituent communities ===
Rimbach's Ortsteile are Albersbach, Lauten-Weschnitz, Mitlechtern, Münschbach, Unter-Mengelbach and Zotzenbach.

=== Climate ===
Owing to its location in Bergstraße district, a mild climate prevails in Rimbach, which often leads to what in Germany is a very early blossoming of the almond trees.

== History ==
=== Pre-18th Century ===
Rimbach probably dates back to a Frankish settlement that emerged in the course of the Frankish land conquest from the 5th century AD. The oldest surviving documentary mention of Rimbach dates back to 795 in the Lorsch Codex, a list of possessions of Lorsch Monastery, and is connected to Charlemagne's donation of the Mark Heppenheim to the monastery. The Mark Heppenheim comprised most of today's Bergstrasse district and large parts of the Odenwald district. In connection with this donation, border disputes arose between Lorsch Abbey and the Bishopric of Worms, which led to the convening of a court of arbitration in 795 on the Kahlberg near Weschnitz, an old meeting place and court not far from today's Walburgis Chapel. As a result of this court of arbitration, a new boundary description was established, which now also named the most important places within the borders of the Mark Heppenheim, namely Furte (Fürth), Rintbach (Rimbach), Morlenbach (Mörlenbach), Birkenowa (Birkenau), Winenheim (Weinheim), Heppenheim, Besinsheim (Bensheim), Urbach (Auerbach), Lauresham (Lorsch) and Bisestat (Bürstadt).

Another early mention can be found in the Lorsch Codex, when in 877 a Liuthar von Hausen donated the villa Rinthbach to the monastery and received it back as a fief. Supported by many other donations, the monastery was one of the largest and most powerful Benedictine abbeys in Germany in the 9th-12th centuries. The heyday of Lorsch Abbey was followed by its decline in the 11th and 12th centuries. During the Investiture Controversy from 1076 (Synod of Worms) to 1122 (Concordat of Worms), many possessions had to be ceded to the nobility. In the late 12th century, attempts were made to reorganize the administration by recording the old property deeds (Lorsch Codex). Nevertheless, in 1232 Emperor Frederick II placed Lorsch Abbey under the control of the Archbishopric of Mainz and its Bishop Siegfried III von Eppstein for reform. At this time, the area of the later Amt Schönberg, to which Rimbach later belonged, was in the possession of the Counts Palatine. However, in 1409, Archbishop Johann von Mainz gave the fief to Schenk Konrad von Erbach with the house and castle barn of Rimbach. However, all other feudal deeds to the Schenken von Erbach were issued by the Counts Palatine. In 1385, Count Palatine Ruprecht I authorized the Schenk Eberhard von Erbach to pledge the villages of Rimbach and Zotzenbach to Hanemann von Sickingen, bailiff of Lindenfels and Hennel von Mosbach, bailiff of Heidelberg.

High jurisdiction over the village was exercised by the Heppenheim Center, whose supreme judge was the burgrave of Starkenburg Castle (above Heppenheim), first mentioned in 1267. Lower jurisdiction was exercised by the Vogteigericht, whose district included Rimbach as well as Lützel-Rimbach, Ober- and Unter-Mengelbach, Mossbach and Zotzenbach. The Schenken von Erbach already held the lower court as a Palatinate fief in the oldest documents. The Worms monastery bailiffs were administrators and court lords within the monastery estate. This office came into the possession of the Counts Palatine as early as 1165. Economically, the village was characterized by the three-field farming of the lords of the manor and the village cooperative until the 18th century. Rye, spelt, oats, spring barley, millet and other crops were cultivated.

A number of names of other landlords have survived from the Middle Ages. The noble families Betzer von Rimbach, Rauch von Rimbach, Jude vom Stein, Beyer von Boppard and the Lords of Rodenstein were feudal lords of the Counts of Erbach or the Counts Palatine During the Erbach rule over Rimbach, the village was assigned to the Schönberg office. Half of the tithe in Rimbach was due to the parish of Rimbach and half to the Lords of Dalberg, who had to maintain the nave of the church in return.

In the 16th century, the Reformation made its way into the Odenwald. By 1544, the Counts of Erbach had introduced the Lutheran creed for their county, and the Palatine rulers also openly sympathized with the Lutheran faith; however, it was only under Ottheinrich, Elector from 1556 to 1559, that the official transition to Lutheran doctrine took place. Before the Reformation, the parish of Rimbach belonged to the "Weinheim district chapter" of the diocese of Worms. The patronage was held by the Counts of Erbach from the Erbach-Fürstenau line, who owned it as a Palatinate fiefdom. In addition to Rimbach, the parish consisted of the villages of Lützel-Rimbach, Münchbach, Zotzenbach, Obermengelbach and two farms in Untermengelbach. Before 1516, the parish also included the villages of Mittelshausen, Scheuerberg, Mitlechtern, Knoden, Schannenbach, Ober-Laudenbach and Scharbach, which were exchanged for a Palatinate share of Reichenbach, as well as Igelsbach, which was exchanged with the Ullners of Dieburg.

The Thirty Years' War began in 1618, and ended in 1622. The Schönberg district suffered as a result, when Ligist troops repeatedly attacked and plundered it. The bloodiest chapter of the Thirty Years' War followed in the mid-1630s with the Franco-Swedish War. Chroniclers from the region at the time reported: "Plague and famine ravaged the land and decimated the population, often leaving the villages completely empty".

In the fall of 1696, Schönberg Castle was attacked during the Nine Years' War. It was only with the Peace of Ryswick in 1697 that the French withdrew behind the Rhine.

At the beginning of the 18th century, the villages of Rimbach, Lützelrimbach and Münschbach together counted 34 centmen and 5 assessors. Agriculture was enriched by the cultivation of legumes such as alfalfa or sainfoin, as well as potatoes; potato cultivation is documented in Zotzenbach as early as 1769. In 1717, the house of the Counts of Erbach was divided and Schönberg Castle became the seat of the younger Erbach-Schönberg line under Count Georg August zu Erbach-Schönberg. The latter received the Schönberg and König offices and half of the Breuberg dominion. The Erbach-Schönberg line made the castle their residence, giving it its current castle character.

=== 19th Century to present ===
On August 14, 1806, Napoleon elevated the Landgraviate of Hesse-Darmstadt to a Grand Duchy. With the Rhine Confederation Act, the County of Erbach was mediatized and incorporated for the most part into the Grand Duchy of Hesse; this also included the "Amt Schönberg", which initially remained as a baronial office.

The court system in the Landgraviate of Hesse-Darmstadt had was reorganized on 9 December 1803. For the Principality of Starkenburg, the "Darmstadt Court" was established as a court of second instance. The courts of first instance were administered by the offices or lords of the manor. The court was the court of second instance for normal civil disputes and the court of first instance for family law and criminal cases. The higher court of appeal was the Court of Appeals of Darmstadt. This meant that the Zente and the associated landgerichts had finally lost their function. The provisions also applied in the Grand Duchy.

After the final defeat of Napoleon, the Congress of Vienna in 1814/15 also confirmed that the County of Erbach belonged to the "Principality of Starkenburg" of the Grand Duchy of Hesse. As a result, provinces were formed in the Grand Duchy in 1816 and the area previously known as the "Principality of Starkenburg" was renamed the "Province of Starkenburg". In 1821/22, as part of a comprehensive administrative reform, the bailiwicks in the provinces of Starkenburg and Upper Hesse of the Grand Duchy were dissolved and administrative districts were introduced, with the Schönberg office being assigned to the Lindenfels administrative district in 1822. As part of this reform, district courts were also created, which were now independent of the administration. Their court districts corresponded in size to the administrative districts. The district court of Fürth was the court of first instance for the district of Lindenfels. It was not until 1826 that all the functions of the former baronial district of Schönberg were transferred to the state. This reform also organized the administrative administration at municipal level. The mayor's office in Rimbach was also responsible for Litzelrimbach (settlement in the district of Rimbach) and Mönsbach (today, as Münschbach, a hamlet in the district of Rimbach). In accordance with the municipal ordinance of June 30, 1821, there were no longer any appointments of Schultheißen, but rather an elected local council made up of the mayor, aldermen and municipal council.

In 1832, the administrative units were further enlarged and districts were created. According to the reorganization announced on August 20, 1832, there were to be only the districts of Bensheim and Lindenfels in South Starkenburg in future; the district of Heppenheim was to fall under the district of Bensheim. However, before the ordinance came into force on October 15, 1832, it was revised to the effect that instead of the district of Lindenfels, the district of Heppenheim was formed as a second district alongside the district of Bensheim, to which Rimbach now belonged.

In 1835 the first doctor with academic training practiced in Rimbach. During these years, the Jewish community built a synagogue, which also built a cemetery in 1846.

The years 1846/49 were characterized by social unrest, many Rimbach residents took part in the popular assembly in Ober-Laudenbach, from which the so-called Ober-Laudenbach incident developed, a confrontation between armed revolutionaries and the military. The revolutionaries wanted to defend the Frankfurt constitution and gathered in Ober-Laudenbach from the surrounding Odenwald. The conductor of the government commission of the Heppenheim administrative district, Christian Prinz, tried to break up the meeting. He was shot in the process, which led to a violent confrontation between the Hessian military and the revolutionaries. 13 men died, 107 were arrested, the others escaped.

On July 31, 1848, the counties and administrative districts of the Grand Duchy were abolished and replaced by "administrative districts", with the former counties of Bensheim and Heppenheim being united to form the administrative district of Heppenheim. However, just four years later, during the Reaction Era, the districts were reorganized and Rimbach became part of the newly created district of Lindenfels.

The population and cadastral lists recorded in December 1852 showed that Rimbach was a market town with 1,958 inhabitants. These include the Hof im Hopper, the Neumühle (Weschnitzmühle) and two brick huts. The district consists of 4,274 acres, of which 2,455 acres are arable land, 638 acres are meadows and 1,037 acres are forest.

In the statistics of the Grand Duchy of Hesse, referring to December 1867, the market town of Rimbach with its own mayor's office, 183 houses, 1553 inhabitants, the district of Lindenfels, the district court of Fürth, the Protestant parish of Rimbach with the deanery in Lindenfels and the Catholic parish of Mörlenbach of the deanery of Heppenheim are listed. The mayor's office is also responsible for the hamlets of Helmsberg (2 houses, 9 pop.), Münchbach (8 houses, 67 pop.), Steckerts(berg) (3 houses, 18 pop.) and Lützel-Rimbach (3 houses, 13 pop. ), the farms Gertelsklinger (1 house, 7 inhabitants), Bückerts (1 house, 9 inhabitants) and Hopper (1 house, 13 inhabitants) and Steinertswiese (1 house, 4 inhabitants), as well as the Ziegelhütte (2 houses, 10 inhabitants). All the settlements were located in the district of Rimbach. The responsible tax commissioner's office was Zwingenberg of the Birkenau district revenue office and the Bensheim chief revenue office. The Dominalienverwaltung consisted of the Rentamt Lindenfels, the Forstamt Wald-Michelbach with the Oberförsterei Rimbach.

During this time, Rimbach developed into the largest market in the Weschnitztal. In 1845, 12 livestock fairs and 4 annual fairs were held. The transport connections improved through the expansion of the Weschnitztalstrasse to the Provinzialstrasse (1840–43) from Fürth to Weinheim. A further improvement was achieved in 1846 with the opening of the Frankfurt am Main–Heidelberg railway, which initially connected Bensheim with Langen, Darmstadt and Heppenheim and was completed a short time later. In 1869 Bensheim was connected to the Riedbahn to Worms by the Nibelungen Railway via Bürstadt and Lorsch. Because of the difficult mountain terrain, the desired west-east connection into the Odenwald was led through the relatively flat Weschnitztal after long discussions. With the construction of the Weschnitztalbahn from Weinheim via Rimbach to Fürth, which went into operation on July 1, 1895, Rimbach was directly connected to the Rhine-Main-Neckar area.

In the period up to World War I, Rimbach experienced further economic and structural improvements. A second class postal expedition was set up in 1870 and the agency of the Heppenheim District Savings Bank was opened in 1873, which was followed by the founding of the savings and credit association in 1875. In 1876 the foundation stone for a new school building was laid and in 1877 Rimbach received the first telegraph. In 1887, the Rimbach Higher Citizens' School was founded, which received its own school building in 1897 (today's Martin Luther School). Rimbach received its first street lighting in 1895 using petroleum lamps. From 1876, approval (award) was granted for several ore mines in the Zotzenbach district. With the laying of the water pipe in 1909, the introduction of electricity in 1910 and the town's first motor vehicle in 1912, the industrial age also progressed in Rimbach.

The Hessian provinces of Starkenburg, Rheinhessen and Upper Hesse were abolished in 1937 following the dissolution of the provincial and district councils in 1936. On November 1, 1938, a comprehensive regional reform came into force at district level. In the former province of Starkenburg, the Bensheim district was particularly affected because it was dissolved and largely assigned to the Heppenheim district. The Heppenheim district also took over the legal successor to the Bensheim district and was given the new name Bergstraße district.

In November 1938, Kristallnacht brought hardship and misery to Jews. The Rimbach synagogue was burned down and the homes and businesses of Jewish families were devastated. Eight Jewish merchants had already been deported to the Osthofen concentration camp. In 1933 the Jewish community still consisted of 77 people, many of whom had moved away or emigrated due to increasing disenfranchisement and reprisals. In 1941 the remaining Jewish residents had to move in together. At the start of the deportations in 1942, ten Jewish Rimbachers still lived in the town. Of those who were born in Rimbach or who lived here for a long time, 54 died as a result of the Nazi regime.

As the population figures from 1939 to 1950 show, Rimbach also took in many refugees and displaced persons from the former German eastern territories after the war. The first Rimbach Pentecost market took place in 1950. Other community events in the 1950s included the inauguration of a new school building in what is now the Albersbach district (1953) and the construction of a village community center (1956), as well as the inauguration of the newly built gym and festival hall of the Martin Luther School. In 1961, the size of the district was given as 1069 hectares, of which 266 hectares were forest. In the 1960s, the local chronicle recorded: 1962 the inauguration of a new elementary school in Rimbach (since 1996 the Brothers Grimm School); In 1964 the Albersdorf district won the state victory in the "Our village should become more beautiful" competition and in 1965 even the gold medal in the national competition.

In the regional reform in Hesse, the municipality of Albersbach joined the municipality of Rimbach on January 1, 1969. Zotzenbach followed on December 31, 1971 with the hamlet of Unter-Mengelbach as well as Lauten-Weschnitz and Mitlechtern. For the last two municipalities it was a majority decision. The alternative proposal to merge with the municipality of Fürth was overruled.

In the 1970s and 1980s the community was able to achieve further infrastructure improvements. In 1972, the new indoor swimming pool was opened and construction began on a Protestant kindergarten in the center of the town. In 1977 Rimbach received a new fire station and in 1978 the sports center was opened. The community kindergarten began operations in 1981 and in 1982 the new drum hall was inaugurated in the Zotzenbach district, which serves as a sports and multi-purpose hall as well as a fire station. The hall was followed in 1988 by a sports facility for the district. In 1987, the redesigned and traffic-calmed Rathausstrasse was opened.

In 1992, Rimbach became the seat of the youth music school for the communities of Überwald and Weschnitztal. In 1994, the Odenwaldhalle (large sports hall) and the "Johanniterhaus Weschnitztal" (retirement and nursing home) were inaugurated in Rimbach and the community received a natural gas connection. In 1995 the community celebrated its 1200th anniversary and the indoor swimming pool was destroyed by the Weschnitz flood.[17] In 1999/2000 the school building in the Albersbach district was converted into a community center and the community website was launched in 1999.

== Politics ==
=== Community council ===
The local elections on March 14, 2021 delivered the following result, compared to previous local elections:

		% 2021	Seats 2021	% 2016	Seats 2016	% 2011	Seats 2011	% 2006	Seats 2006	% 2001	Seats 2001
SPD	Social Democratic Party of Germany	29.6	7	38.0	9	42.6	11	52.1	16	46.3	14
CDU	Christian Democratic Union of Germany	20.8	5	23.8	5	25.5	6	23.2	7	25.2	8
GRÜNE	The Greens	13.7	3	8.9	2	13.8	4	5.4	2	5.0	2
FW	Free Voters' Association	18.7	4	17.7	4	13.8	3	9.0	3	9.9	3
FDP	Free Democratic Party	11.2	3	11.5	3	4.4	1	5.8	2	6.1	2
BMN	Alliance Man and Nature	6.1	1	—	—	—	—	—	—	—	—
UBL	Independent Citizens List	—	—	—	—	—	—	4.5	1	7.6	2
Total		100.0	23	100.0	23	100.0	25	100.0	31	100.0	31
Voter Turnout		55.2		50.1		52.7		64.2		57.6	

=== Mayor ===
According to the Hessian municipal constitution, the mayor is elected for a six-year term of office, since 1993 in a direct election, and is the chairman of the municipal council, which in the municipality of Rimbach includes a first alderman and eight other aldermen in addition to the mayor. Since August 1, 2012, the mayor has been Holger Schmitt, who is independent of the party. He was elected as the successor to Hans-Jürgen Pfeifer (SPD), who did not stand for re-election after three terms in office, on March 4, 2012 in the first ballot with a 57.3% turnout and 69.1% of the vote. This was followed by two re-elections, most recently, unopposed, in February 2024.

Terms of office of the mayors

- 2012-2030 Holger Schmitt
- 1994-2012 Hans-Jürgen Pfeifer (SPD)
- 1971-1981 Georg Adam Schmitt (SPD)
- 1946-1971 Adam Schmitt (SPD)
- 1945-1946 Ludwig Nikolaus Spilger (SPD)

=== Town partnerships ===
- Colwich-Haywood, Staffordshire, England, United Kingdom since 1983
- Thourotte, Oise, France since 1983

== Economy and infrastructure ==
=== Transport ===
Rimbach lies on the Weschnitztalbahn (railway) from Weinheim to Fürth in the Odenwald.

Moreover, Bundesstraße 38 runs through Rimbach. The Saukopftunnel, dedicated in 1999, made it possible to detour around Birkenau on Bundesstraße 38a, improving Rimbach's road link with Weinheim and the Autobahn network. A new bottleneck, however, has cropped up at Mörlenbach, whose bypass is being planned.

=== Education ===
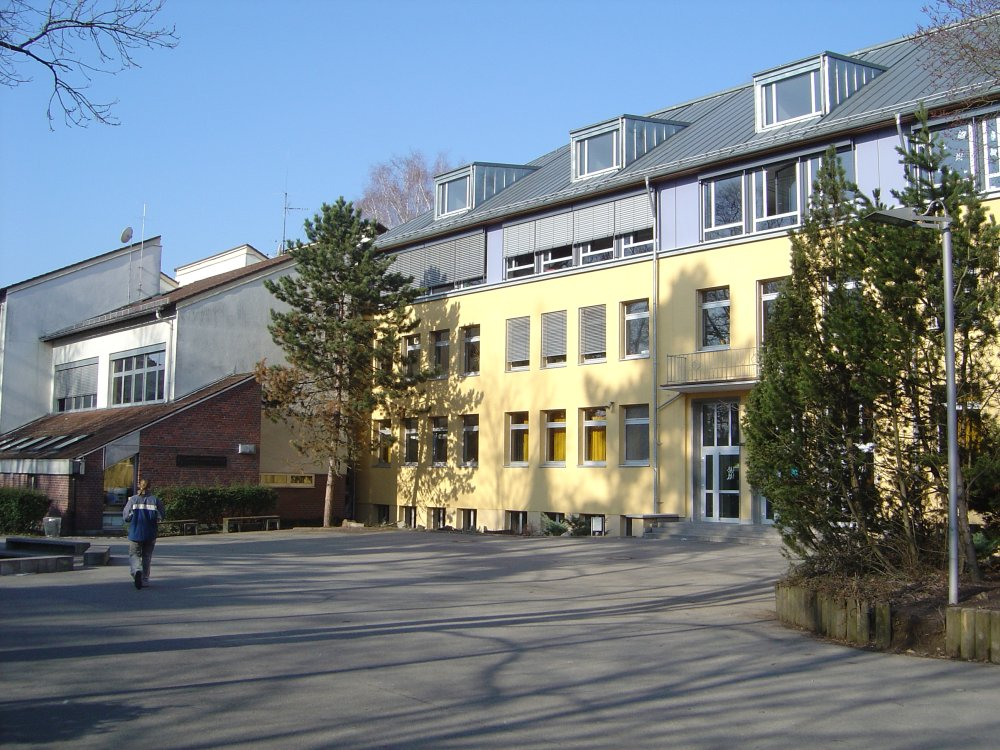
Martin-Luther-Schule (Gymnasium)

- 5 kindergartens
- 1 daycare centre
- 3 primary schools
- 1 Hauptschule and Realschule (RBS)
- 1 Gymnasium (Martin-Luther-Schule)

== Culture and sightseeing ==
=== Theatre ===
- K.U.S.S. - Martin-Luther-Schule students' theatre
- Jugendbühne - Martin-Luther-Schule students' theatre
- Center Stage - English Theater - Martin-Luther-Schule students' theatre
- Grünes Theater - KSG Mitlechtern

=== Regular events ===
- Rimbescher Kerwe (church consecration festival)
- Rimbacher Pfingstmarkt (Whitsun market)
- Rimbacher Herbst (Autumn)
- Rimbacher Frühling (Spring)
- Schwarzwurzelfastnacht in Rimbach ("Black Sausage Carnival")
- Nikolausparty in Rimbach

=== Youth groups ===
- Katholische Junge Gemeinde (KJG) St. Elisabeth Rimbach (a tent camp every year)
- Christliche Pfadfinderschaft im CPD (Scouting)
- Jugendfeuerwehr (youth fire brigade)
- Jugendrotkreuz (Red Cross)
