= Hemsbach =

- Town
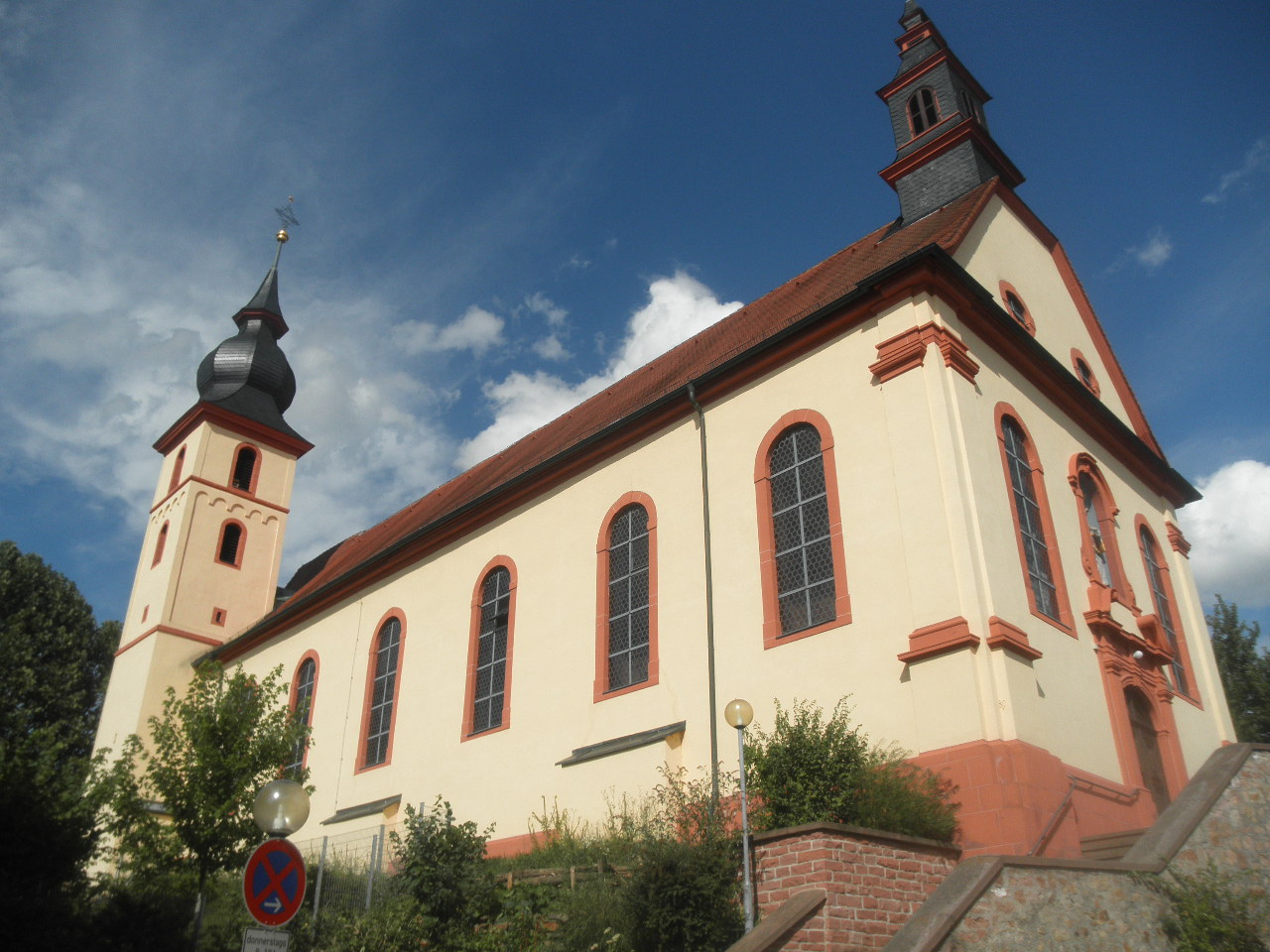
- Saint Lawrence Church

- Coat of arms

- Location of Hemsbach within Rhein-Neckar-Kreis district
- Interactive map of Hemsbach
- Location within Germany Location within Baden-Württemberg
- Coordinates: 49°35′25″N 08°39′23″E
- Country: Germany
- State: Baden-Württemberg
- Admin. region: Karlsruhe
- District: Rhein-Neckar-Kreis

Government
  - Mayor (2019–27): Jürgen Kirchner

Area
  - Total: 12.85 km^{2} (4.96 sq mi)
- Elevation: 107 m (351 ft)

Population (2025-12-31)
  - Total: 11,822
  - Density: 920.0/km^{2} (2,383/sq mi)
- Time zone: UTC+01:00 (CET)
  - Summer (DST): UTC+02:00 (CEST)
- Postal codes: 69494–69502
- Dialling codes: 06201
- Vehicle registration: HD
- Website: www.hemsbach.de

Hemsbach (German pronunciation: [ˈhɛmsˌbax]) is a town with approximately 12,000 inhabitants in the Rhein-Neckar-Kreis of Baden-Württemberg, Germany. It belongs to the European Rhine-Neckar Metropolitan Region (Lower Neckar region until 20 May 2003 and Rhine-Neckar-Odenwald region until 31 December 2005). It is situated on the Bergstraße, 18 km northeast of Mannheim. Hemsbach was twinned with Wareham, Dorset in the UK in 1986.

== Geography ==
=== Location and Environment ===
Hemsbach's district extends 85 to 340 metres above sea level along Bergstraße, that is, in the transition area between the Odenwald and the Upper Rhine Plain, along the same named stream.

The municipality borders Laudenbach in the north, the Hessian Heppenheim, Mörlenbach and Birkenau in the east, the town of Weinheim in the south and Viernheim, Lampertheim and Lorsch in the west.

The Hemsbach district has a strong west–east extension and extends over 1,286 hectares (4.97 sq mi). Of this, 25.7 percent is settlement and traffic area, 48.5 percent is used for agriculture and 22.8 percent is wooded.

=== Town structuring ===
The hamlets Balzenbach and Weschnitz-Siedlung, Am Mühlweg (Jewish cemetery), the palace and the Schafhof (Waldnerhof) and Watzenhof farmsteads belong to the town of Hemsbach.

== History ==
In 795 the town was first mentioned in a document as Hemmingisbach in the Lorsch Codex. It was about a border settlement to the property of the Lorsch Abbey in the "Mark Heppenheim", including Hemsbach.

After the dissolution of the abbey in 1232, the village was a bone of contention between the Electoral Palatinate and the Archbishops of Mainz for a century, until the Palatinate was adjudicated the villages of Hemsbach, Laudenbach and Sulzbach in 1344 by arbitration. The town was assigned to Palatinate-Mosbach in 1410. Count Otto of Mosbach pledged a large part of the rights to the Prince-Bishopric of Worms in 1449. After the Palatinate-Mosbach line died out in 1499, however, customs privileges were returned to the Electoral Palatinate, which also claimed regional sovereignty. The dispute remained unresolved until Hemsbach finally fell to the Electorate Palatinate in 1705 under an exchange agreement with the Bishop of Worms.

At the dissolution of the Electoral Palatinate Hemsbach was taken by Baden in 1803 and annexed to the Weinheim administration. On the night of May 1, 1811, a stagecoach with two Swiss merchants was attacked by Hölzerlips and his gang on the Bergstraße just short of Hemsbach. Hans Jacob Rieter from Winterthur died of his injuries. In 1812, the Sulzbach settlement in the south of Hemsbach was separated and became independent.

During the "Baden Revolution" in 1849, Hessian troops and Baden rebels met near Hemsbach and engaged in heavy fighting. A cannon ball in the outer wall of the Hemsbach train station still commemorates this today.

Politically, the national liberals dominated since the foundation of the Reich in 1871 until they were ousted by the Social Democrats in 1907, who were usually the strongest party also during the Weimar Republic. In the 1933 German federal election, the Nazi Party received 30 percent and the Communist Party 21 percent of the votes.

The Cäsar-Oppenheimer-Platz is named after a Jewish 91-year-old man who died in 1940 as a result of his deportation to Gurs internment camp. At least 15 of the 54 Jewish inhabitants living in Hemsbach in 1933 died in the persecutions of the Jews during the Nazi era until 1945.

With the dissolution of the district of Mannheim within the scope of the municipal reform of 1973, the municipality became part of the new Rhein-Neckar-Kreis. In 1979 the municipality of Hemsbach was given the status of a town. In 1983, the Hemsbach district Rennhof changed the federal state: it was incorporated into Hüttenfeld, a district of Lampertheim in Hesse.

Year	1496	1777	1818	1852	1905	1939	1950	1961	1967	1970	1991	1995	2005	2010	2015
Inhabitants	320	1,319	1,508	1,701	2,255	3,039	4,238	4,786	7,252	9,677	12,725	12,689	12,400	12,290	12,050

== Religions ==
During the Protestant Reformation the Reformation was introduced in Hemsbach as in the entire Palatinate. In 1653 the Catholic denomination was allowed again and the only church of the town, the St. Laurentius church, was used by both religious communities as a simultaneous church. The simultaneum was soon abolished in the Electoral Palatinate, but continued to exist in Hemsbach until a new Protestant church was consecrated in 1936.

Families of the Jewish faith have been documented since the 17th century. Since 1845 they had their own synagogue with a ritual bath (mikvah) and a cemetery. From 1836 to 1872 there was a Jewish elementary school. At the November pogrom of 1938, on November 10, 1938, foreign SA troops detonated an explosive charge in the synagogue, causing major destruction. Incineration of the building was prevented by neighbours who feared the flames might spread to other buildings. As a result, prayer books, ritual objects and other furnishings were thrown into the yard and set on fire there. Today the synagogue serves as an interdenominational meeting and memorial place.

Hemsbach has an Evangelical Free Church (Baptist), the Protestant Bonhoeffer congregation centre, the Protestant Luther congregation, the Catholic parish of St. Laurentius, and a New Apostolic congregation.

== Politics ==
=== Municipal Council ===
In addition to the mayor, the municipal council has 22 members. The results of the municipal council elections of 25 May 2014 were as follows (with comparative figures from 2009):

Party / List	2014		2009	
Christian Democratic Union	34.7 %	8 seats	29.3 %	7 seats
Social Democratic Party	23.8 %	5 seats	21.3 %	5 seats
Green-Colourful-List	8.6 %	2 seats	9.2 %	2 seats
Pro Hemsbach	32.8 %^{*}	3 seats	17.9 %	4 seats
Free Voters	32.8 %^{*}	4 seats	11.4 %	2 seats
Voter Turnout	50.1 %		51.7 %	

^{*} summarised in the federal state statistics

=== Mayor ===
The mayor is directly elected every eight years. The 2011 election was won by independent Jürgen Kirchner. He was supported by the Social Democratic Party, the electoral community Pro Hemsbach and the Green-Colourful-List and took office in 2012.

- 1988–2011: Volker Pauli (Christian Democratic Union)
- Since 2012: Jürgen Kirchner (independent)

=== Coat of arms ===
The blazon of the coat of arms reads: In Silber ein schwarzes Schulterjoch, begleitet oben und unten von je einer roten Rose mit grünen Kelchblättern (german, "In silver a black tension hook, accompanied above and below by a red rose each with green sepals"). It goes back to a court seal from 1490. The fact that Hemsbach already had a coat of arms comparatively early on was due to its function as a customs office on Bergstraße. The tincture of the coat of arms was established by the General State Archives in 1910. The meaning of the roses is not clear, probably in former times it was only a decoration. However, the meaning and origin of the symbols in the coat of arms is not yet finally clear to Hemsbach historians. In his research results, Old Town Councillor Edwin F. Höhn convincingly explained in 1992 that the curved symbol in the middle of the coat of arms represents a tension hook. A tensioning hook was formerly used in this wine-growing area to comfortably transport loads on the steep slopes. A basket or bucket was attached to each end of the hook and the containers were thus clamped together by the tensioning hook. When the grapes were harvested, the containers were grape baskets; when dung was distributed, they were dung baskets. The distribution of the load between two containers was very advantageous. The total weight could also be comfortably placed on one shoulder, with one container at the front and one at the rear. This allowed the wearer to walk unhindered through the narrow rows of vines and still have one hand free to carry another object, to hold on to something or to make his way through. A symbol of viticulture can also be found in the coats of arms of the neighbouring communities. Thus the municipality of Laudenbach carries the scythe in its coat of arms. A scythe is a sickle-shaped knife that was used for efficient cutting of grapes and vines up to our time. The Weinheim coat of arms bears the symbol of the wine ladder. The heavy wine barrels used to be transported with its use. As already mentioned, the Hemsbach coat of arms contains the symbol of a five-leaf rose above and below the hook symbol. For the most historically correct interpretation Edwin F. Hook lead the way. Before the Hemsbach court seal was used to confirm documents, documents were confirmed with the seals of the local priests and probably also with seals of the village lords of Hemsbach. The Hemsbach coat of arms can be found for the first time in an imprint of the Hemsbach court seal on a document from 1476. At this time the ownership of the village and the castle of Hemsbach had already passed from the Elector of Electoral Palatinate to the Bishop of Worms. The bishop of Worms was Reinhard von Sickingen and his brother Dietrich von Sickingen was village lord of Hemsbach. The von Sickingen family had five silver bullets in their coat of arms. The five-leaf rose in the Hemsbach coat of arms could be an adoption of the five balls from the coat of arms of those of Sickingen, whereby the balls were arranged differently to rose petals. With this interpretation of the historical connections the pure decoration of the rose in the Hemsbach coat of arms would be traced back to a real power-political background of its time of origin.

=== Twin Towns ===
Hemsbach has maintained twin town relations with Bray-sur-Seine in the Seine-et-Marne department in France since 1972, with Wareham west of Bournemouth in Great Britain since 1986 and with Mücheln in the Saalekreis district of Saxony-Anhalt since 1990.

== Culture and Places of Interest ==
=== Museums ===
The former synagogue now houses a museum on the history of the Jews in Hemsbach.

=== Buildings ===
Only the residential tower, today called the "Zehntscheuer", of the castle that existed around 1421 has survived. At the back of the residential tower there is a medieval bay window. It is Hemsbach's oldest building.

In 1837 Count Waldner von Freundstein bought the sheep farm to the east of Hemsbach and had the 10.1m high Waldner Tower built on the hill above it. The listed observation tower is also called the "Vierritterturm" (german, "Four Knights Tower") because it is decorated in the upper corners with four statues of knights whose heads have been knocked off though. From the upper 7.6m high observation deck with its eight small windows you have a good view over the Odenwald and over Hemsbach into the Rhine Plain.

The St. Laurentius church was built in the middle of the 18th century and extended by two axes in 1808. The baroque plaster building is provided with corner pilasters. The church tower with its cathedral dome stands on the west side at the transition of the polygonal choir to the nave. On the south facade there is an arched niche with the holy Laurentius. The trapezoidal gable closes with a ridge turret.

The old town hall dates from 1698, its ground floor hall from 1618. 1852 the upper floor was rebuilt after a fire. The open ground floor hall of the two-storey plaster building opens up to the street with three round arches. On the gable rests a ridge turret and at the southwest corner there is a square tower extension.

The central building of the new castle dates back to a villa built in 1764 by the Electoral Palatinate hunting council Blesen. In 1839 Karl Mayer von Rothschild acquired the building and had it extended. In 1925 the municipality acquired the property and has used it as a town hall ever since.

=== Recreation ===
The Brennessel art house cinema has received several awards for its outstanding annual film programme. The 20-hectare (49-acre) site of the Wiesensee outdoor pool and lake serves for local recreation. Numerous clubs and sports facilities complete the free-time offerings.

The "Hemsbacher Kerwe" is known far beyond the town. The Kerwe takes place every year on the first Friday in August for four days and is widely known for its wine taverns. After Weinheim, it attracts the most visitors, also from the wider region.

The "Wein- und Blütenfest" (german, "wine and flower festival") (at the end of April/beginning of May with a dance into May) owes its importance to Hemsbach being a wine town and location for tourism on the Bergstraße.

The sports offerings of the clubs in Hemsbach are diverse. The TC 1965 is the largest tennis club with ten courts. TV Hemsbach is one of the largest clubs in the town. Especially successful are the Penguin Tappers, who participate in international tap dancing championships.

The towns youth centre "Hemsbach 'JuZ'" offers young people the opportunity to spend their free time there according to their wishes. Founded in 1973 on the initiative of young people and students, the Hemsbach youth centre is one of the oldest of its kind. Every year the youth centre organises the Hemsbach holiday games, a twelve-day offer for 125 children with excursions and a four-day camping trip.

== Economy and Infrastructure ==
=== Traffic ===
Hemsbach has always had good traffic connections to the region. The town has its own junction on the Bundesautobahn 5 (Frankfurt-Karlsruhe), which runs through the municipality. The Bundesstraße 3 (Darmstadt-Heidelberg), an important traffic route in the Bergstraße area since Roman times, runs through the town as well.

The Main-Neckar-Railway Frankfurt-Heidelberg also runs through the town. Local passenger trains ("Regionalbahnen") stop here and create connections to the hubs of Mannheim, Heidelberg, Darmstadt and Frankfurt. From Monday to Friday Hemsbach is also served by the Main-Neckar-Express (Mannheim-Frankfurt am Main). Bus lines lead to Laudenbach and Weinheim. Hemsbach belongs to the tariff zone of the Verkehrsverbund Rhein-Neckar.

The nearest airports are Mannheim City Airport (20 km) and Frankfurt Airport (65 km).

The district connecting road ("Kreisverbindungsstraße") KVS / K 4229, which branches off the B 38 in Weinheim, runs through Sulzbach, Hemsbach and Laudenbach and meets the B 3 south of Heppenheim, was opened on 22 May 2015. The engineering office Habermehl und Follmann (Rodgau) presented possibilities for a further connection to the A 5 motorway in the Heppenheim Building, Environment and Urban Development Committee (BUS). The traffic prognoses for 2025: for Laudenbach/Hemsbach there would be a bundling of traffic on the K4229 and an increase of 950 to 2,300 cars per day, but also a relief of the B 3 and L 3110.

=== Education ===
In Hemsbach there are three primary schools (Goetheschule, Uhlandschule and Hebelschule), one Hauptschule (Schillerschule) with Werkrealschule, one Realschule (Carl-Engler-Realschule) and the Bergstraßen-Gymnasium. The Realschule and the Gymnasium are combined in one building. The Hauptschule is also close to the building. The Bildungszentrum (german, education centre), which contains all three schools, is backed by the three neighbouring communities of Hemsbach, Laudenbach and Weinheim-Sulzbach. There are five kindergartens for the youngest inhabitants. The Badische Bergstrasse Folk High School has a branch in Hemsbach. The catholic community runs a public library.

== Individuals ==
=== Known People from Hemsbach ===
- Hans Helwig (1881–1952), member of the Reichstag of the Nazi Party, SS-Brigadeführer and commandant of the concentration camps Ankenbuck, Lichtenburg and Sachsenhausen
- Alwin Renker (1931–2013), catholic priest, religious pedagogue and old testamentist
- Mai Thi Nguyen-Kim (born 1987), German chemist, science communicator, television presenter and YouTuber

=== People Connected to the Town ===
- David Pareus (1548–1622), protestant theologian, held the pastoral office in Hemsbach from 1573 to 1577
- Reinhard Wolf (1589–1637), priest in Hemsbach from 1613, gave the funeral address for the priest Anton Praetorius from Laudenbach in 1613
- Hölzerlips (1770–1812), Bandit, led the raid on a stagecoach on the street in front of Hemsbach in 1811
- Carl Mayer Freiherr von Rothschild (1788–1855), since 1839 the first honorary citizen of Hemsbach
- Jack van Doorn, trumpeter, singer, orchestra leader, citizen of Hemsbach
