= Mörlenbach =

- Municipality
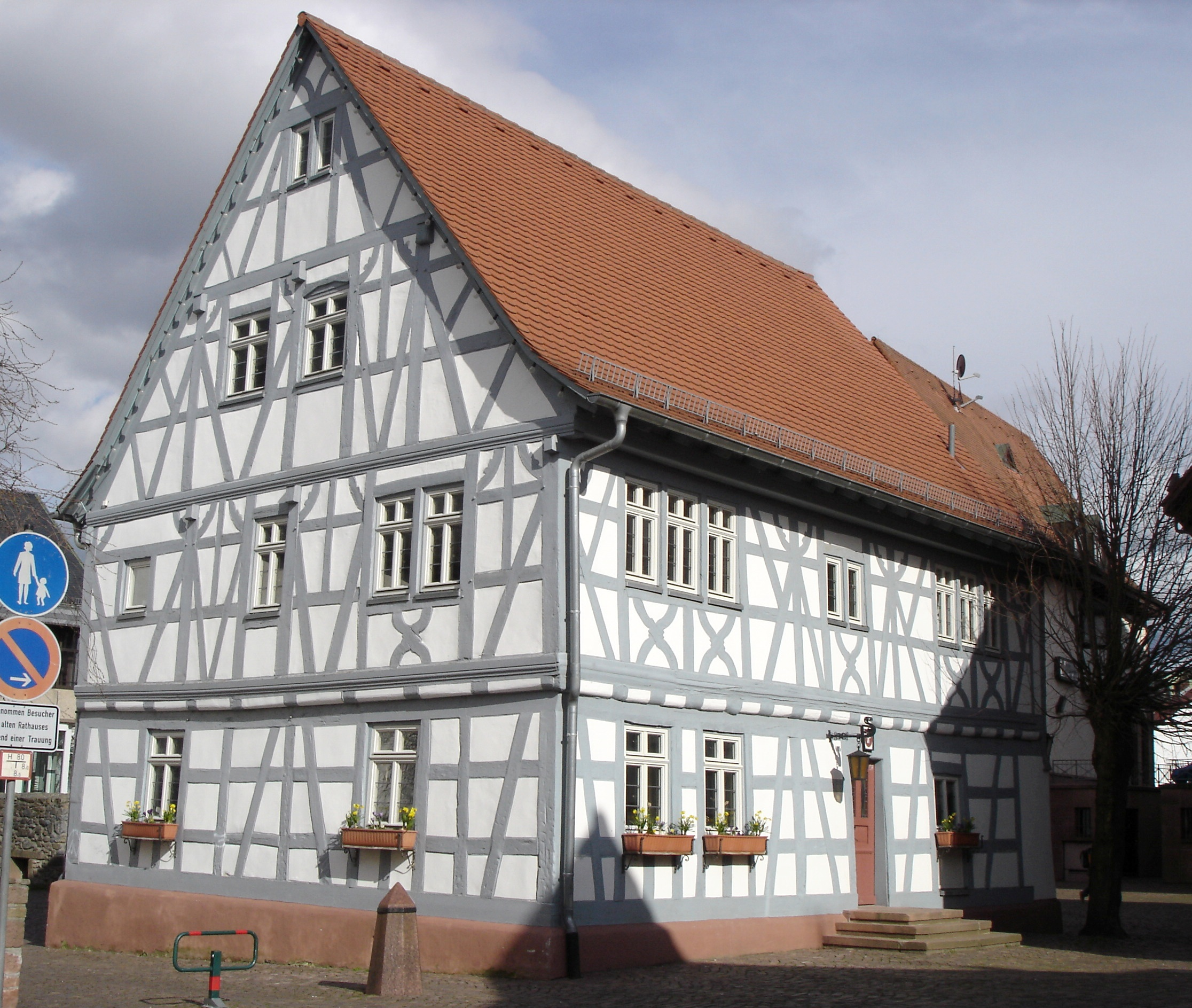
- Old town hall

- Coat of arms

- Location of Mörlenbach within Bergstraße district
- Interactive map of Mörlenbach
- Location within Germany Location within Hesse
- Coordinates: 49°35′57″N 8°44′5″E
- Country: Germany
- State: Hesse
- Admin. region: Darmstadt
- District: Bergstraße
- Subdivisions: 7 parts

Government
  - Mayor (2021–27): Erik Kadesch

Area
  - Total: 27.22 km^{2} (10.51 sq mi)
- Elevation: 160 m (520 ft)

Population (2025-12-31)
  - Total: 10,200
  - Density: 375/km^{2} (971/sq mi)
- Time zone: UTC+01:00 (CET)
  - Summer (DST): UTC+02:00 (CEST)
- Postal codes: 69509
- Dialling codes: 06209, 06201 (Rohrbach)
- Vehicle registration: HP
- Website: www.moerlenbach.de

Mörlenbach is a municipality in the Bergstraße district in southern Hesse, Germany.

== Geography ==
=== Location ===
The community lies in the Odenwald some 25 km north of Heidelberg and about 30 km northeast of Mannheim, as well as lying 8 km southeast of Heppenheim. It is found on Bundesstraße 38 and through it flow the Weschnitz and the community’s namesake, the Mörlenbach.

=== Neighbouring communities ===
Mörlenbach borders in the north on the community of Rimbach, in the east on the communities of Wald-Michelbach and Abtsteinach, in the south on the community of Birkenau, in the west on the town of Hemsbach and the community of Laudenbach (both in the Rhein-Neckar-Kreis in Baden-Württemberg), and in the northwest on the town of Heppenheim.

=== Constituent communities ===
Mörlenbach’s Ortsteile are Mörlenbach-Mitte, Weiher, Bonsweiher, Ober-Mumbach, Kleinbreitenbach, Großbreitenbach, Vöckelsbach, Ober-Liebersbach, Geisenbach, Rohrbach, Bettenbach and Juhöhe.

=== Climate ===
Owing to its location on the Bergstraße, a mild climate prevails in Mörlenbach, which often leads to what, in Germany, is a very early blossoming of the almond trees.

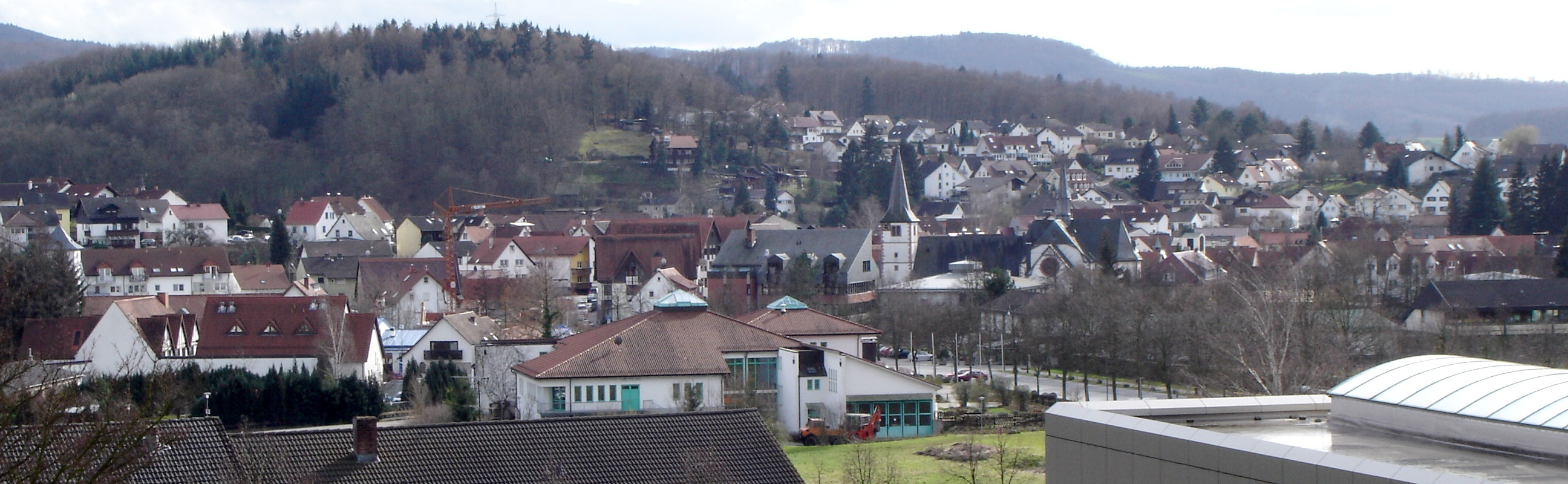
Panorama of Mörlenbach

== History ==
In 795, Mörlenbach had its first documentary mention. In the 13th century, Mörlenbach gained strategic importance because it lay between Electorate of the Palatinate and the Archbishopric of Mainz. In 1995, Mörlenbach celebrated its 1,200 year jubilee. In the course of municipal reform, the outlying centres were amalgamated into Mörlenbach in 1970 and 1971.

== Politics ==
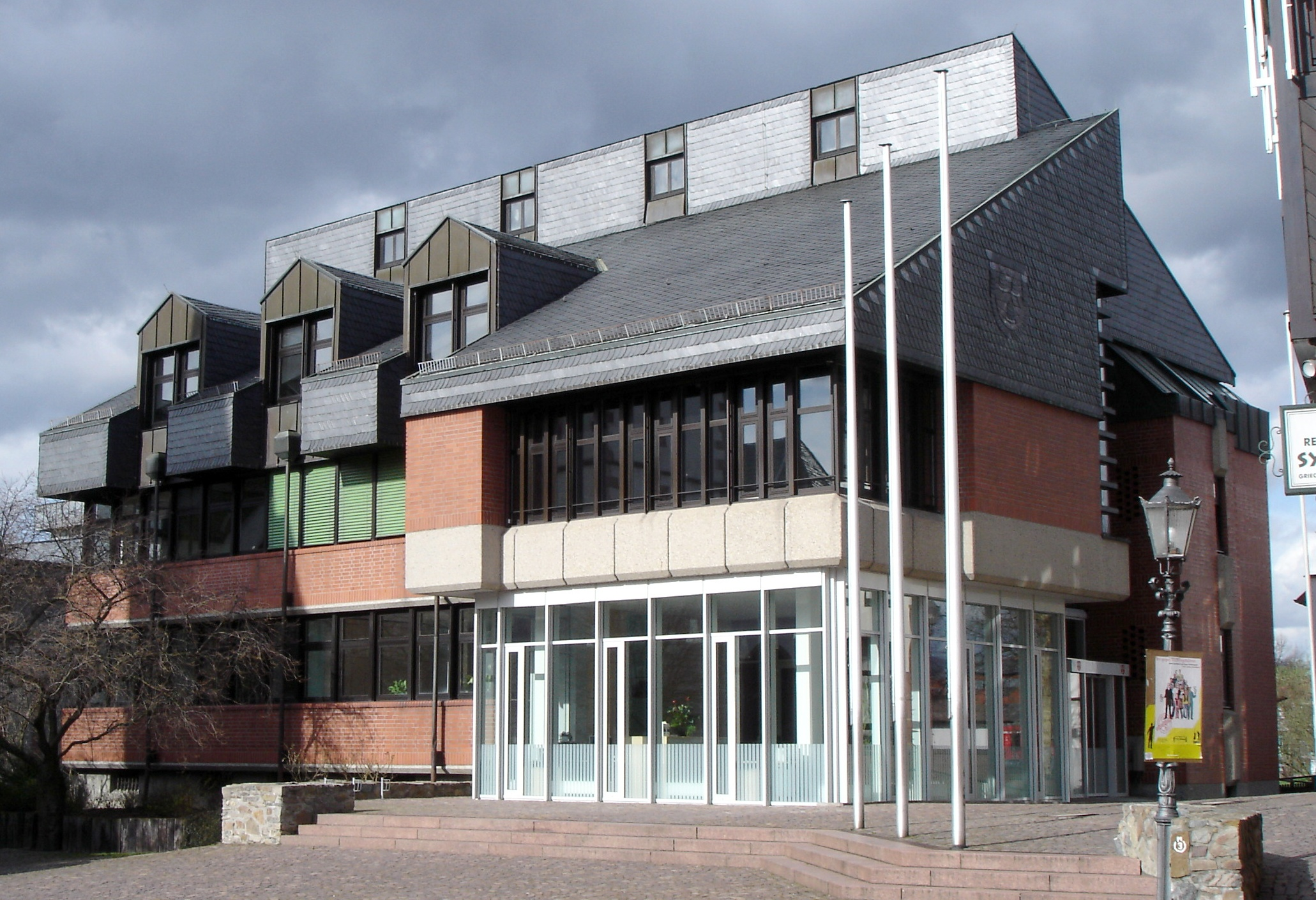
New Town Hall of 1978

=== Community council ===
The municipal election held on 26 March 2006 yielded the following results:

Parties and voter communities		% 2006	Seats; 2006	% 2001	Seats; 2001
CDU	Christian Democratic Union of Germany	42.7	13	41.6	15
SPD	Social Democratic Party of Germany	23.8	8	27.3	10
GREENS	Bündnis 90/Die Grünen	10.3	3	7.4	3
BV	Bürgervereinigung	10.1	3	13.6	5
UFW/FWG	Unabhängige Freie Wähler/ Freie Wählergemeinschaft	7.3	2	6.6	3
FDP	Free Democratic Party	5.8	2	3.5	1
Total		100.0	31	100.0	37
Voter turnout in %		47.7		54.0	

=== Mayor ===
The mayor is chosen in a direct election for a term of six years. Since 1991, Lothar Knopf has been Mörlenbach’s mayor. Since 2015, Jens Helmstädter is Mörlenbach’s mayor.

=== Coat of arms ===
The community’s arms might be described thus: Gules three bells argent in triangle inverted.

The three bells are the subject of a local legend, according to which they were plunged into a pond during the Thirty Years' War lest they be stolen by invaders sacking the community. Later, however, even after an intensive search, they were not found again.

=== Town partnerships ===
- (Germany) Großbreitenbach, Thuringia
- Aszófő, Veszprém, Hungary
- Gárdony-Agárd, Fejér, Hungary
- Gondreville, Meurthe-et-Moselle, France

== Culture and sightseeing ==
=== Buildings ===
On the marketplace with its village fountain are found the Old and New town halls, the Catholic church and a restored remnant of a defensive wall from the 13th century.

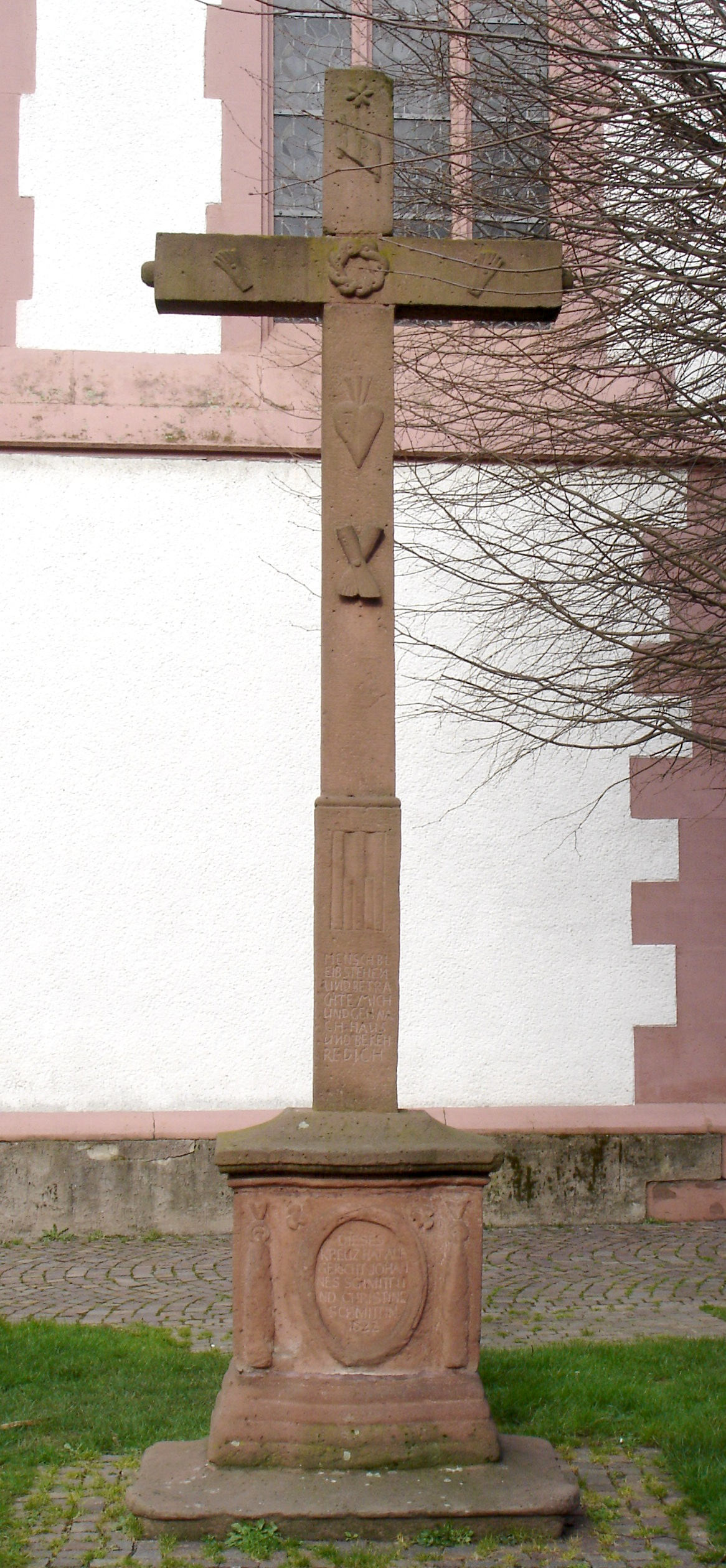
Cross from 1822

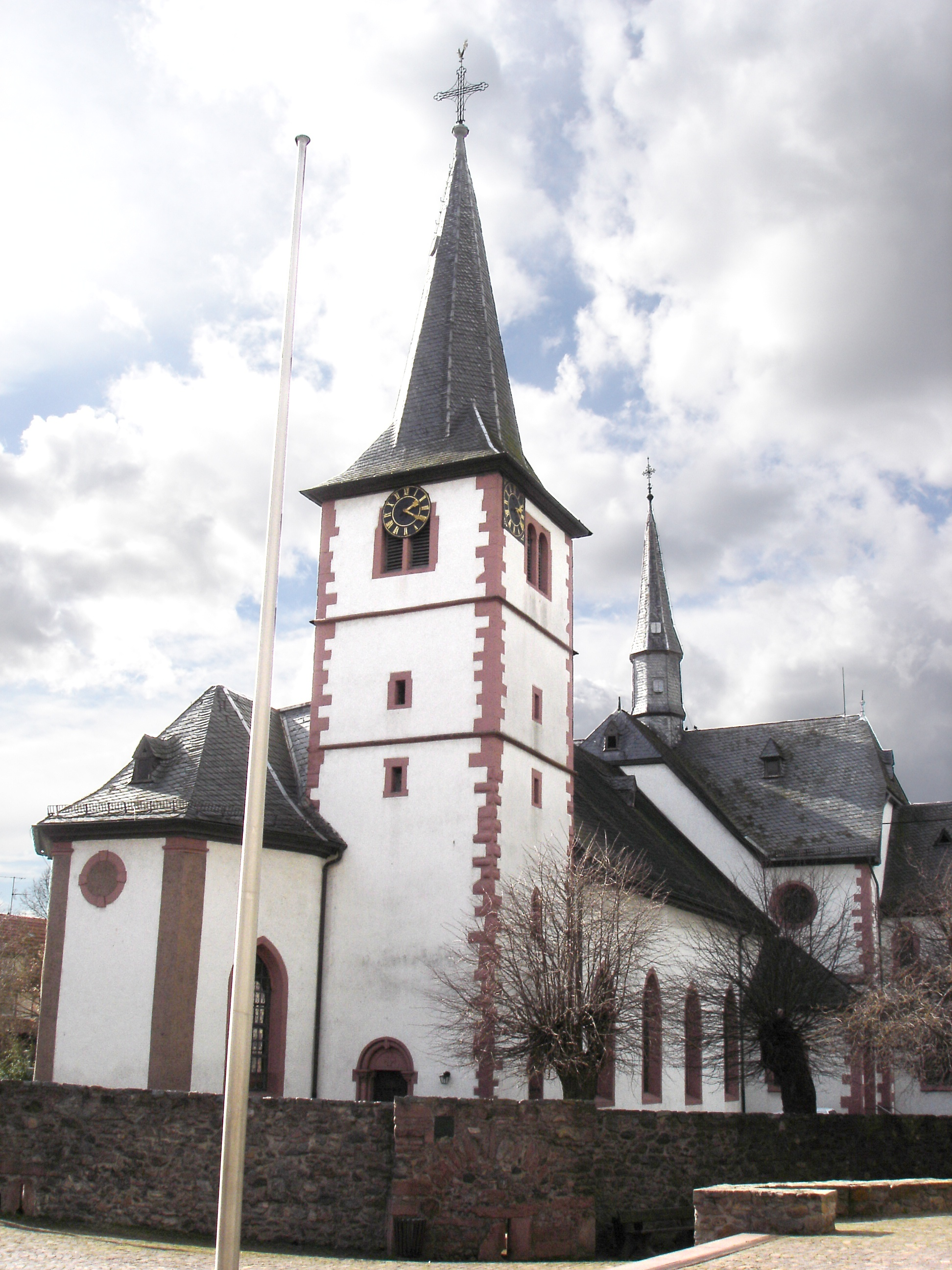
Saint Bartholomew’s Catholic Parish Church

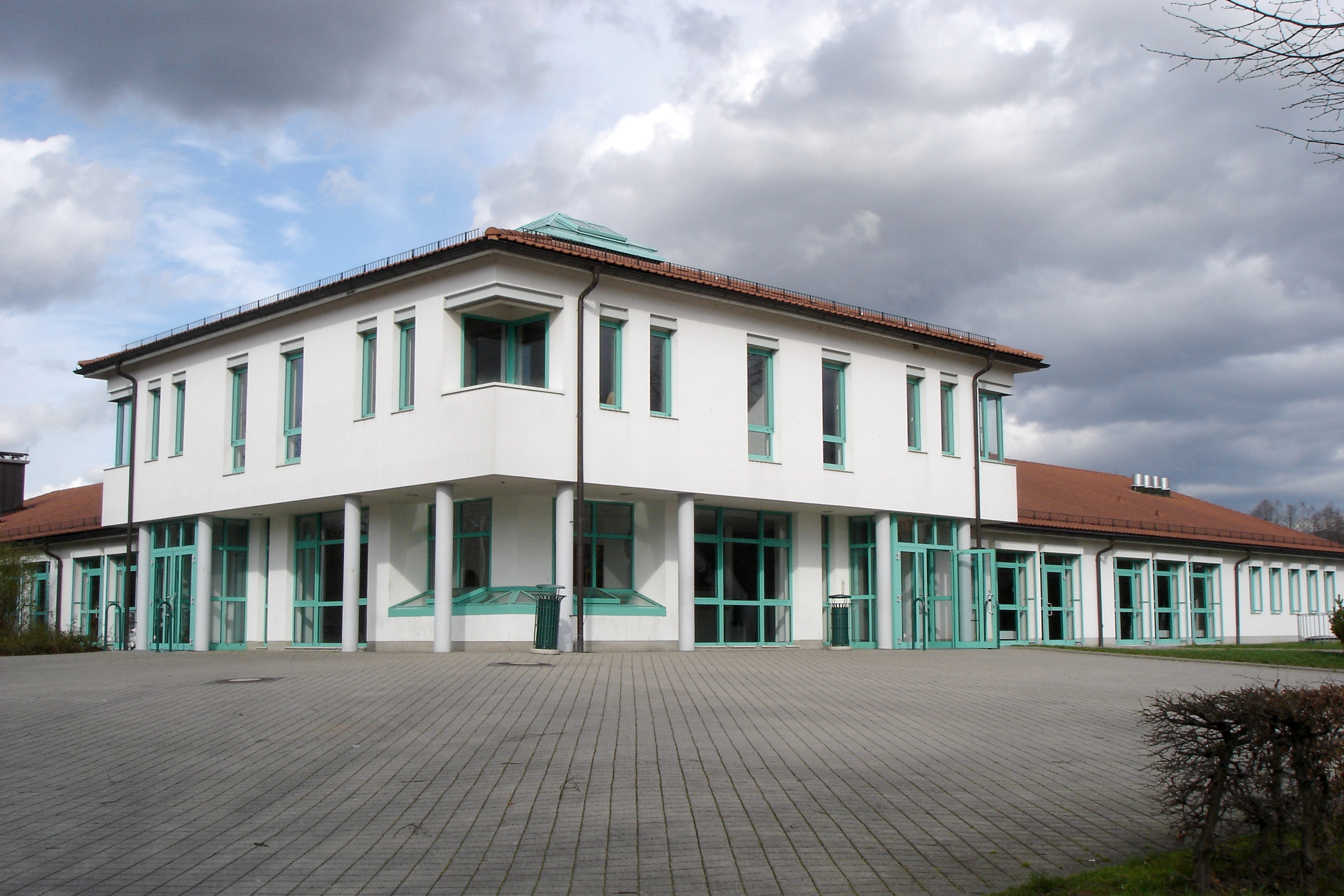
Community centre

The Old Town Hall comes from the year 1504, according to the lintel, although the timber framing was heavily modified in the late 17th century. Until 1930 or 1931 it was used as a school and a teacher’s house, but was then built into the mayor’s administrative seat, which was moved to the newly built New Town Hall in 1978. Now renovated both inside and outside, it is now used for, among other things, performing civil marriages.

The Catholic Saint Bartholomew’s Parish Church (Pfarrkirche St. Bartholomäus) from the 12th and 13th centuries houses among other artworks three altars, among them one by Michel Erhart from 1494 and a 400-year-old organ from the chapel of the Friedrichsbau, a Renaissance building at Heidelberg Castle.

In Mörlenbach are found several crosses made of red sandstone, like the one before the Catholic Church’s southern transept from 1822.

The community centre (Bürgerhaus), completed in 1994 offers room for up to 900 persons and is used for a broad spectrum of events.

== Regular events ==
Each year on the last weekend in August, the Mörlenbach church consecration festival (Kerwe), whose centre forms the “festival village”, is held.

On the first weekend in Advent each year, the Mörlenbach Advent Market is held at the Town Hall.

Every other year, in the centre of Mörlenbach, trade, craft and industry stage the Krämermarkt (“Traders’ Market”), which is as much a performance as it is the upholding of old customs.

== Culture and sightseeing ==
=== Education ===
- 6 kindergartens
- 1 primary school
- 1 school for help with learning (Weschnitztalschule)

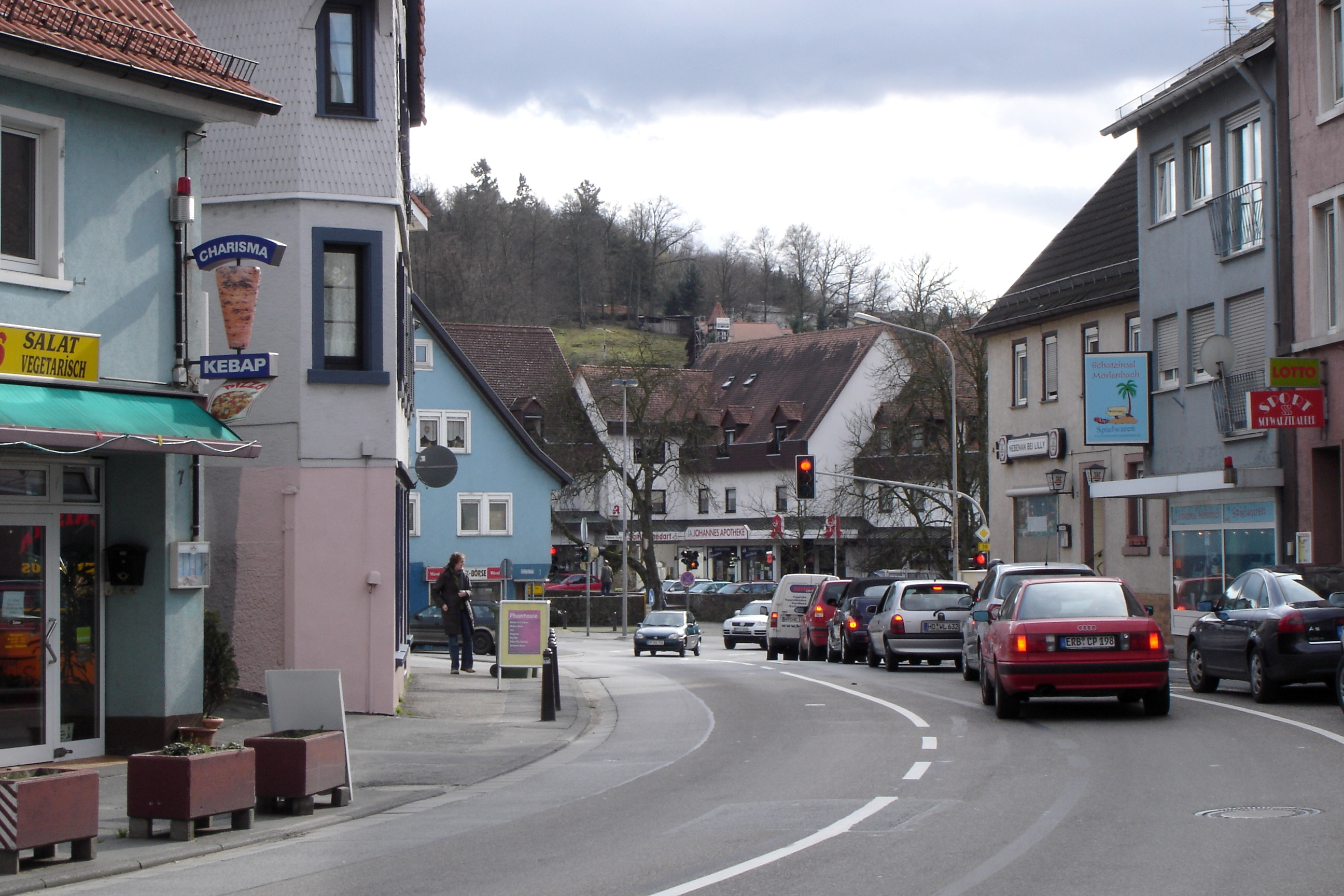
B38 running through the community

=== Transport ===
Owing to Mörlenbach’s central location in the Weschnitz valley, it is a transport hub. Through Mörlenbach runs Bundesstraße 38, which is the main traffic artery in the Rhine-Neckar agglomeration. In the heart of the community, the L 3120, coming from the Überwald, meets the B 38 and runs farther on to Heppenheim. The Saukopftunnel, dedicated in 1999, links Mörlenbach directly to the Autobahn network.

The B 38a bypass is in planning and should lead to a lightening of the traffic load within the community. The planning was however delayed by discrepancies between the supporters of different alternatives for realizing the project, with environmental groups favouring a tunnel under the community (Variant W4) and the community itself advocating a detour around the community (Variant O2).

Mörlenbach lies in the area of the Verkehrsverbund Rhein-Neckar (“Rhine-Neckar Transport Network”). Mörlenbach railway station is on the Weschnitztalbahn (Weinheim–Fürth (Odenwald)) and is served hourly – half-hourly at weekday peak times – by DB Regio AG Regionalbahn trains. The station is the former junction where the now disused Überwaldbahn branched off for Wald-Michelbach.
