= Grasellenbach =

- Municipality
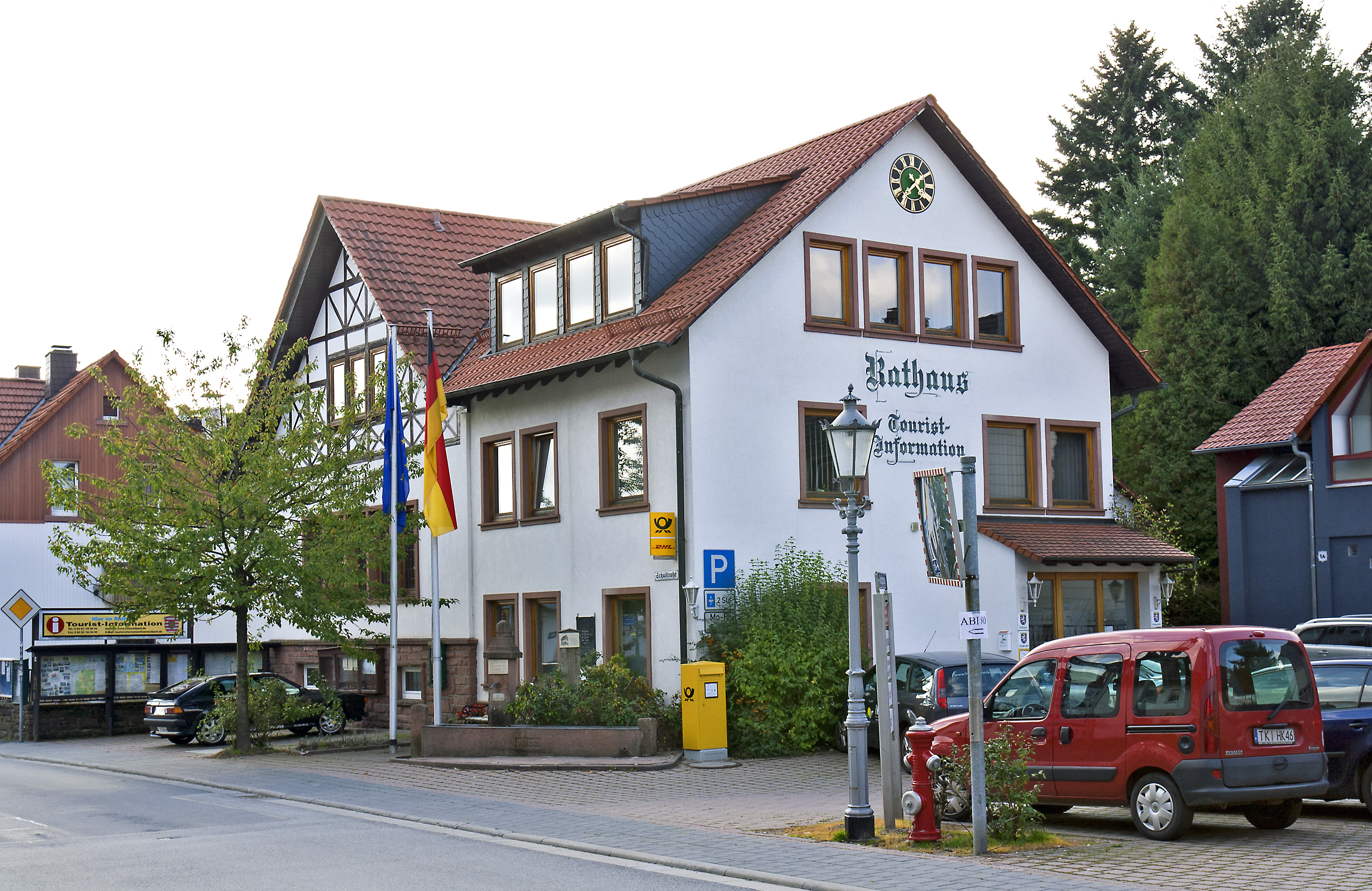
- Town hall

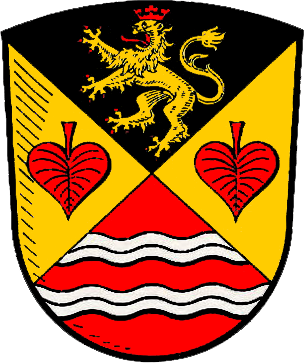
- Coat of arms

- Location of Grasellenbach within Bergstraße district
- Interactive map of Grasellenbach
- Location within Germany Location within Hesse
- Coordinates: 49°38′N 8°53′E
- Country: Germany
- State: Hesse
- Admin. region: Darmstadt
- District: Bergstraße

Government
  - Mayor (2021–27): Markus Röth

Area
  - Total: 22.88 km^{2} (8.83 sq mi)
- Elevation: 389 m (1,276 ft)

Population (2025-12-31)
  - Total: 3,887
  - Density: 169.9/km^{2} (440.0/sq mi)
- Time zone: UTC+01:00 (CET)
  - Summer (DST): UTC+02:00 (CEST)
- Postal codes: 64689
- Dialling codes: 06207, 06253
- Vehicle registration: HP
- Website: www.grasellenbach.de

Grasellenbach is a municipality in the Bergstraße district in southern Hesse, Germany.

== Geography ==
=== Location ===
The community lies in the Odenwald and the UNESCO Geo-Naturpark Bergstraße-Odenwald at elevations between 420 and 580 m above sea level. The southern Odenwald's two most important brooks, the Ulfenbach and the Weschnitz, which both rise in the constituent community of Hammelbach where the Neckar-Rhine watershed runs, flow through the community's several centres.

=== Neighbouring communities ===
Grasellenbach borders in the north on the community of Fürth, in the east on the community of Mossautal (Odenwaldkreis), in the south on the community of Wald-Michelbach and in the west on the community of Rimbach.

== History ==
The community of Grasellenbach took its current form in 1972 through the merger of the formerly self-governing communities of Hammelbach (Litzelbach), Gras-Ellenbach, Wahlen and Scharbach.

These centres had already had a bond lasting from the Middle Ages to the early 19th century when they were all in the Electorate of the Palatinate’s Aicher Cent (tithing area). Only Litzelbach belonged to the Abtsteinach tithing area in the Archbishopric of Mainz. The Cent – an administrative division similar to a community today – bore the name Aicher or Hammelbacher Cent. The name Aicher Cent it got from the court’s location, which lay where a Gefehlte Aiche – an oak with many trunks – stood. Hammelbach’s first documentary mention goes back to the year 795, while the other constituent communities had theirs about 1300. The Electorate of the Palatinate’s and Mainz’s overlordship in the area lasted until 1802, when under the Reichsdeputationshauptschluss they all became part of the Grand Duchy of Hesse.

The village, whose livelihood originally came from craftsmen and farmers, experienced an upswing in the 19th century owing to the boom in new red sandstone processing. In the 20th century, tourism grew in importance, earning an especially prominent place in Gras-Ellenbach’s local economy. The community of Grasellenbach as a whole nowadays has roughly 4,000 inhabitants.

=== Constituent communities ===
Grasellenbach’s Ortsteile are Gras-Ellenbach, Wahlen, Hammelbach, Litzelbach, Scharbach and Tromm.

==== Hammelbach ====
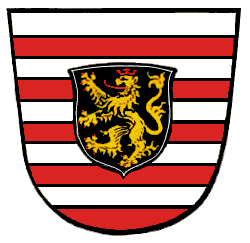
Hammelbach's coat of arms

Today’s open-air resort (Luftkurort) of Hammelbach is, with some 1,400 inhabitants, the biggest and oldest of Grasellenbach’s constituent communities, as well as its administrative seat.

The name Hammelbach means “brook at a steep bank”. It refers to the two most important brooks that rise here, the Ulfenbach and the Weschnitz.

In Hammelbach are found both the Evangelical and the Catholic church. Furthermore, there are a spring-fed outdoor swimming pool in Hammelbach and a campsite. Hammelbach's church consecration festival, called a Kerwe here, is held each year on the last weekend in September, and draws its beginning from the time when the Evangelical Reformed church, built in 1802, was consecrated. Hammelbach has been historically regarded as the only constituent community that may legitimately hold a kermis, as that is where the Evangelical church stands.

In the Middle Ages, Hammelbach was the tithing centre for the Aicher or Hammelbacher Cent. Worth seeing are the Gothic chapel ruins from the 14th century at the graveyard and the historic bakehouse.

Each year in March, the so-called Schwarzpulverrally (“Gunpowder Rally”) is held. For this event, countless motorcyclists from all over Germany always come to Hammelbach.

==== Gras-Ellenbach ====
The Kneipp spa of Gras-Ellenbach with its roughly 950 inhabitants lies at elevations between 450 and 550 m.

The meadowland here through which flows the Ulfenbach is supposedly the place's namesake (Gras means “grass” in German, and Bach means “brook”). The Ellen part of the name most likely comes from the word Elm, which had the same meaning in German as it still has in English (although the current German word is Ulme). There are other suggested derivations, but they are disputed.

Gras-Ellenbach is a state-recognized open-air resort (Luftkurort) with a Kneipp spa. On the Heimatbühne (“Homeland Stage”) in the Nibelungenhalle, Odenwald plays are staged.

==== Tromm ====
Tromm is, with some 100 inhabitants, the smallest and highest of Grasellenbach's constituent communities, and lies on the like-named mountain ridge (577 m above sea level at its peak) among meadows and woods.

As the “House Mountain” of the Überwald region, the Tromm was early on a touristic outing destination. Near the peak is found the 27 m-tall Irene-Turm (tower), built in 1910, which affords a broad view. The constituent community of Tromm today presents itself as a recreational resort with a plethora of hiking trails. Also on offer are winter sports.

The Hof-Theater Tromm has available a year-round programme of offerings. The year's high point is the theatre festival Trommer Sommer.

At the Tromm conference houses at the Karl Kübel Foundation's Odenwald Institute, there are regular seminars on the themes of job, family, communication and personal development.

The three other constituent communities of Wahlen (about 900 inhabitants), Scharbach (about 470) and Litzelbach (about 150) are first and foremost recreational resorts.

== Politics ==
=== Community council ===
The municipal election held on 26 March 2006 yielded the following results:

Parties and voter communities	% 2006	Seats 2006	% 2001	Seats 2001
CDU	33.2	8	29.7	7
SPD	33.1	7	34.2	8
Freie Parteilose Wählergruppe Grasellenbach	25.2	6	28.6	6
GREENS	8.6	2	7.6	2
Total	100.0	23	100.0	23
Voter turnout in %	53.2		59.5	

=== Mayor ===
Markus Röth has been mayor of Grasellenbach since 1997.

== Economy and infrastructure ==
The community's livelihood is earned mainly through tourism. To promote this, Grasellenbach has joined the so-called network of Nibelungenstädte – Nibelung Towns. Serving as the grounds for this is the presumption that the legendary figure Siegfried the Dragon Slayer, the main character in the Nibelungenlied, was murdered somewhere near the constituent community of Gras-Ellenbach by Hagen, at the Siegfriedbrunnen (“Siegfried’s Spring”).

=== Transport ===
Grasellenbach is linked with Autobahn A 5 by Bundesstraße 460.

Buslines run to the railway stations in Heppenheim and Weinheim, which, just like Grasellenbach, belong to the Rhine-Neckar Transport Network (Verkehrsverbund Rhein-Neckar).

Between 1901 and 1983, the constituent community of Wahlen was the terminus of the Überwaldbahn (railway).
