= Hardberg (Odenwald) =

Hill in Hesse, Germany

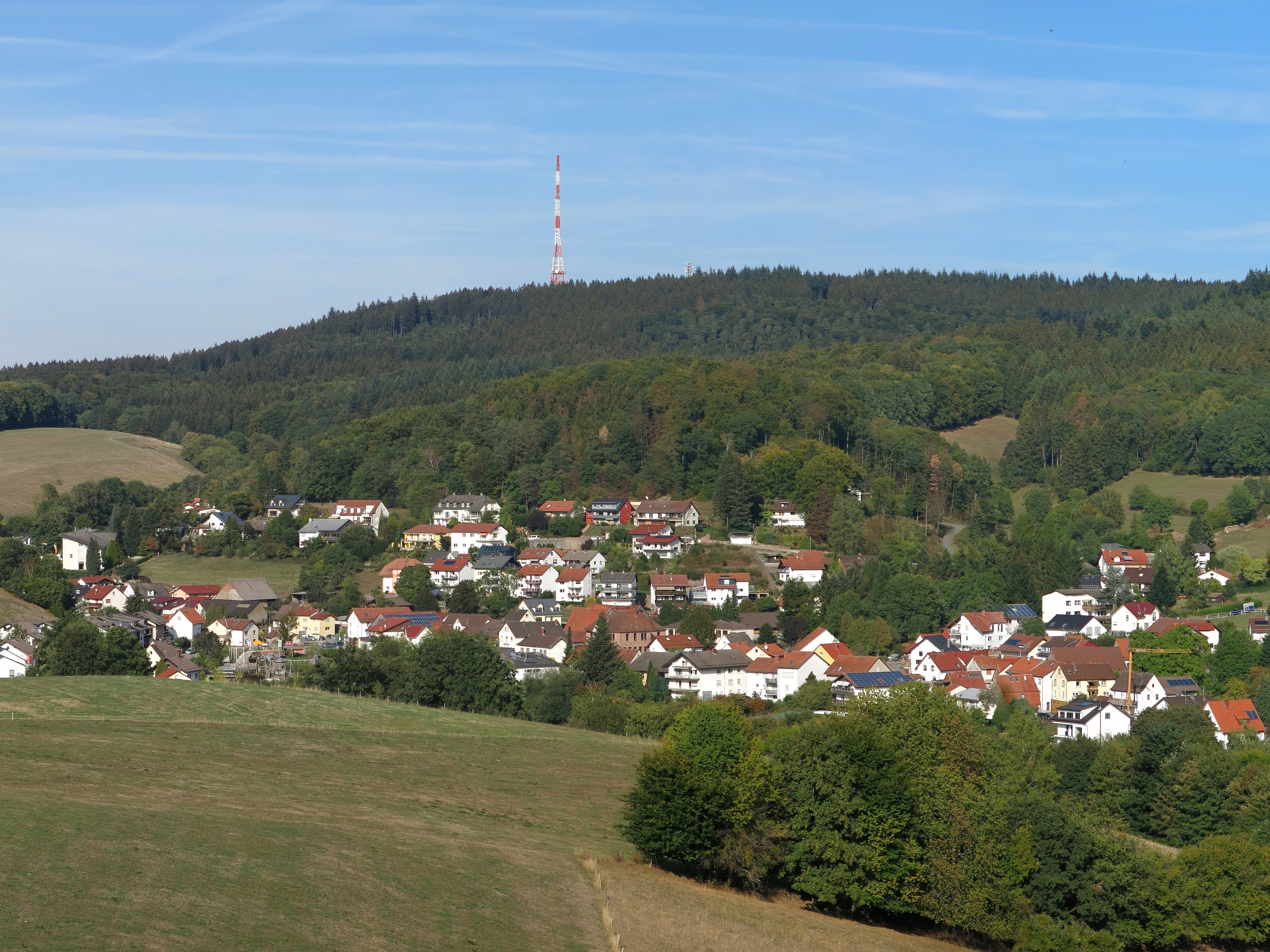
- The Hardberg seen from southwest

Highest point
- Elevation: 593 m (1,946 ft)

Geography
- Location: Hesse, Germany

Hardberg is a hill in the Odenwald range in Hesse, Germany.

It is home to the Hardberg Transmission Tower, a 135-metre-high free-standing lattice tower on the Hardberg mountain in Germany at 49°32′28″N 8°48′17″E. The Hardberg Transmission Tower is 135 metres high, weighs 130 tons and stands on an area of 12 * 12 metres.
