= Fürth, Hesse =

Fürth
- Municipality
- Coat of arms

- Location of Fürth within Bergstraße district
- Interactive map of Fürth
- Location within Germany Location within Hesse
- Coordinates: 49°39′N 8°47′E
- Country: Germany
- State: Hesse
- Admin. region: Darmstadt
- District: Bergstraße
- Subdivisions: 11

Government
  - Mayor (2021–27): Volker Oehlenschläger (CDU)

Area
  - Total: 38.41 km^{2} (14.83 sq mi)
- Elevation: 193 m (633 ft)

Population (2025-12-31)
  - Total: 10,653
  - Density: 277.3/km^{2} (718.3/sq mi)
- Time zone: UTC+01:00 (CET)
  - Summer (DST): UTC+02:00 (CEST)
- Postal codes: 64658, 64385 (Gumpener Kreuz)
- Dialling codes: 06253
- Vehicle registration: HP
- Website: www.gemeinde-fuerth.de

Fürth (German pronunciation: [fʏʁt]) is a municipality and a state-recognized recreational resort (Erholungsort) in the Bergstraße district in Hesse, Germany.

== Geography ==
=== Location ===
The community lies in the UNESCO Geo-Naturpark Bergstraße-Odenwald on the Weschnitz, a small river that empties into Rhine near Biblis. Fürth is the northernmost and highest community in the Weschnitz valley, which stretches southwestwards to Weinheim.

=== Neighbouring communities ===
Fürth borders in the north on the town of Lindenfels and the community of Reichelsheim, in the east on the community of Mossautal (both in the Odenwaldkreis), in the southeast on the community of Grasellenbach, in the south on the community of Rimbach and in the west on the town of Heppenheim.

=== Constituent communities ===
Fürth's eleven Ortsteile are Brombach, Ellenbach, Erlenbach, Fahrenbach, Kröckelbach, Krumbach, Linnenbach, Lörzenbach, Seidenbach, Steinbach and Weschnitz.

=== Climate ===
In Fürth, in the Odenwald, a notably cooler climate prevails than on the neighbouring Bergstraße. In the winter months, this is often clearly shown in the higher snowfall in Fürth. On the other hand, the community is also favoured by the weather owing to its sheltered location, and is often spared storms.

== History ==
Fürth had its first documentary mention in connection with a donation by Charlemagne to the Benedictine monastery of the Lorsch Abbey, founded in 764. In the course of the monastery's being raised to Imperial Abbey, answerable only to the Pope, and no longer within the grasp of the bishoprics of Mainz and Worms, the Emperor donated to the monastery the domain of Heppenheim in 773, which comprised the greater part of today's Bergstraße district and great parts of the Odenwaldkreis.

In the border description from 773, Fürth is not mentioned, but the Welinehouc (Wahlenhügel, now known as the Kahlberg) near today's constituent community of Weschnitz is. Furthermore, Arezgreften (Erzgruben in modern German, meaning “ore pits”) on the Erzberg near Weschnitz are discussed. In connection with this donation, there arose border disputes between the Lorsch Abbey and the Bishopric of Worms, which in 795 led to the convening of an arbitral tribunal on the Kahlberg near Weschnitz, an old gathering place and court site not far from today's Walburgiskapelle (chapel). The tribunal handed down a new border description which now named the most important places within the Mark Heppenheim, namely Furte (Fürth), Rintbach, Morlenbach, Birkenowa, Winenheim, Hepenheim, Besinsheim, Urbach (Auerbach), Lauresham and Bisestat. The first documentary mention of the name Fürth, therefore, fell in the year 795. The name Fürth may well refer to the former ford (Furt in German) once found here.

A “Description of the Huben and Crops of the Estate of Fürth” (curiam Furde) – a Hube being a plot of land big enough to feed one household, similar to a hide in the word's original meaning – from 1023 shows the development that was brought about by this donation and the subsequent clearing and reclamation of the land by Lorsch monks: Fürth was spoken of as principalis curia, or the “first estate”, or Fürstenhof. Thus, Fürth was Lorsch's most important administrative and fiscal centre in the Odenwald. There followed a precise statement of the crops of the lands in the various centres. Besides Fürth itself, these are the places named in connection with this: Kolmbach, Nieder-Brombach, Fahrenbach, Krumbach, Ober-Brombach, Weschnitz, Alt(en)lechtern and Kröckelbach (in ascending order of size of Huben) as holdings subject to interest, further Steinbach as a holding subject to tithing and Erlenbach as a holding subject to meadowland tithing. In Fürth itself, Weschnitz and Fahrenbach a mill is mentioned. Further, owing to incoming crops it was suggested that the corresponding handicraft products be available: 12 bolts (Bahnen) of fine shirt linen, 8 barrels, 8 measuring instruments, 1 mortar, 40 serving dishes, in the one year a pan, in the other a kettle.

In 1895, the Weschnitztalbahn (railway) was opened, linking Fürth with Weinheim.

== Politics ==
=== Community council ===
The municipal election held on 26 March 2006 yielded the following results:

Parties and voter communities		% 2006	Seats; 2006	% 2001	Seats; 2001
CDU	Christian Democratic Union of Germany	50.4	16	53.9	20
FWG	Freie Wähler Gemeinschaft	23.9	7	–	–
SPD	Social Democratic Party of Germany	21.0	7	27.1	10
GREENS	Bündnis 90/Die Grünen	4.6	1	–	–
FW-UPW	Freie Wähler - Unabhängige parteilose Wählergemeinschaft	–	–	19.0	7
Total		100.0	31	100.0	37
Voter turnout in %		49.1		57.1	

=== Mayor ===
The mayor is chosen in a direct election for a term of six years. Since 7 September 2008, the mayor has been Volker Oehlenschläger (CDU). He received 54.8% of the vote.

=== Coat of arms ===
The community's arms might be described thus: Argent a cross fitchy gules, thereupon a letter F argent.

The cross fitchy (that is, with a point on the bottom arm; called a Nagelkreuz [“nailcross”] or a Fußspitzkreuz [“foot point cross”] in German) recalls the Lorsch Abbey’s former landlordship. The lowercase F in Antiqua script was already borne in an earlier court coat of arms from 1626. The arms were approved in 1926.

== Culture and sightseeing ==
=== Buildings ===
Saint John the Baptist’s Parish Church (Pfarrkirche St. Johannes d.T. ) was newly built in 1752 as a one-room church with a quire that is three-sided on the outside and in plain Baroque style. It is marked on the west façade by an open-air staircase (the statues, however, are new). The belltower is in the Romanesque Revival style and dates from 1866–68. The expansion on the south side was carried out in 1960–61.

Timber-frame houses from the 18th and early 19th centuries enrich the townscape. A further highlight is the artistic path in the Steinbach meadows, which a few years ago was furnished with stone figures by renowned artists.

Also worth seeing is the Bergtierpark (“Mountain Animal Park”), to be found in the constituent community of Erlenbach. It has on show mountain creatures from five parts of the Earth and is open the year round.

Standing as an extensive art gallery is the Kunstwanderweg (“artistic path”) from Fürth to Lindenfels, built in 2007 and beginning at the town hall

== Economy and infrastructure ==
=== Transport ===
Fürth railway station is the end of the Weschnitztalbahn, beyond which there are half-hourly Regionalbahn trains to Weinheim.

=== Education ===
Fürth has two primary schools, the Müller-Guttenbrunn-Schule and the Schule am Katzenberg in the constituent community of Erlenbach. The former elementary school Paul-Joseph-Schule in Erlenbach lost this name in 1973 when it merged with the school in Rimbach-Mitlechtern. It was named after the former teacher Paul Joseph, notwithstanding that in the time of National Socialism, he had been known as a fervent Adolf Hitler stalwart and Party member. There is also an integrated comprehensive school, the Heinrich-Böll-Schule with some 900 students.

== Famous people ==
- Wolfgang Kunkel (1902–1981), law historian
