= Adam Karrillon =

German writer and physician (1853–1938)

Adam Karrillon (12 May 1853 – 14 September 1938) was a German writer and physician. In 1923, with composer Arnold Mendelssohn, he won the inaugural Georg Büchner Prize.

== Works ==
- Eine moderne Kreuzfahrt (1898)
- Michael Hely (1900/1904)
- Die Mühle zu Husterloh (1906)
- O domina mea (1908)
- Im Lande unserer Urenkel (1912)
- Bauerngeselchtes: Sechzehn Novellen aus dem Chattenlande (1914)
- Adams Großvater (1917)
- Sechs Schwaben und ein halber (1919)
- Am Stammtisch zum faulen Hobel (1922)
- Erlebnisse eines Erdenbummlers (1923)
- Viljo Ronimus: Das Schicksal eines Kassenarztes (1925)
- Windschiefe Gestalten (1927)
- Meine Argonautenfahrt (1929)
- Es waren einmal drei Gesellen (1933)
- Zwei die nicht zusammen sollten, Zwei die sich auseinandergrollten, Zwei die nicht ohne Grund sich hassten, Endlich zwei, die z'sammen passten (1933)
- Der Rosenstock (1935)
- Balthasar Ibn Knierem (1936)
- Der erste Flug vom Nest (1937)
