= Birkenau (Odenwald) =

- Municipality
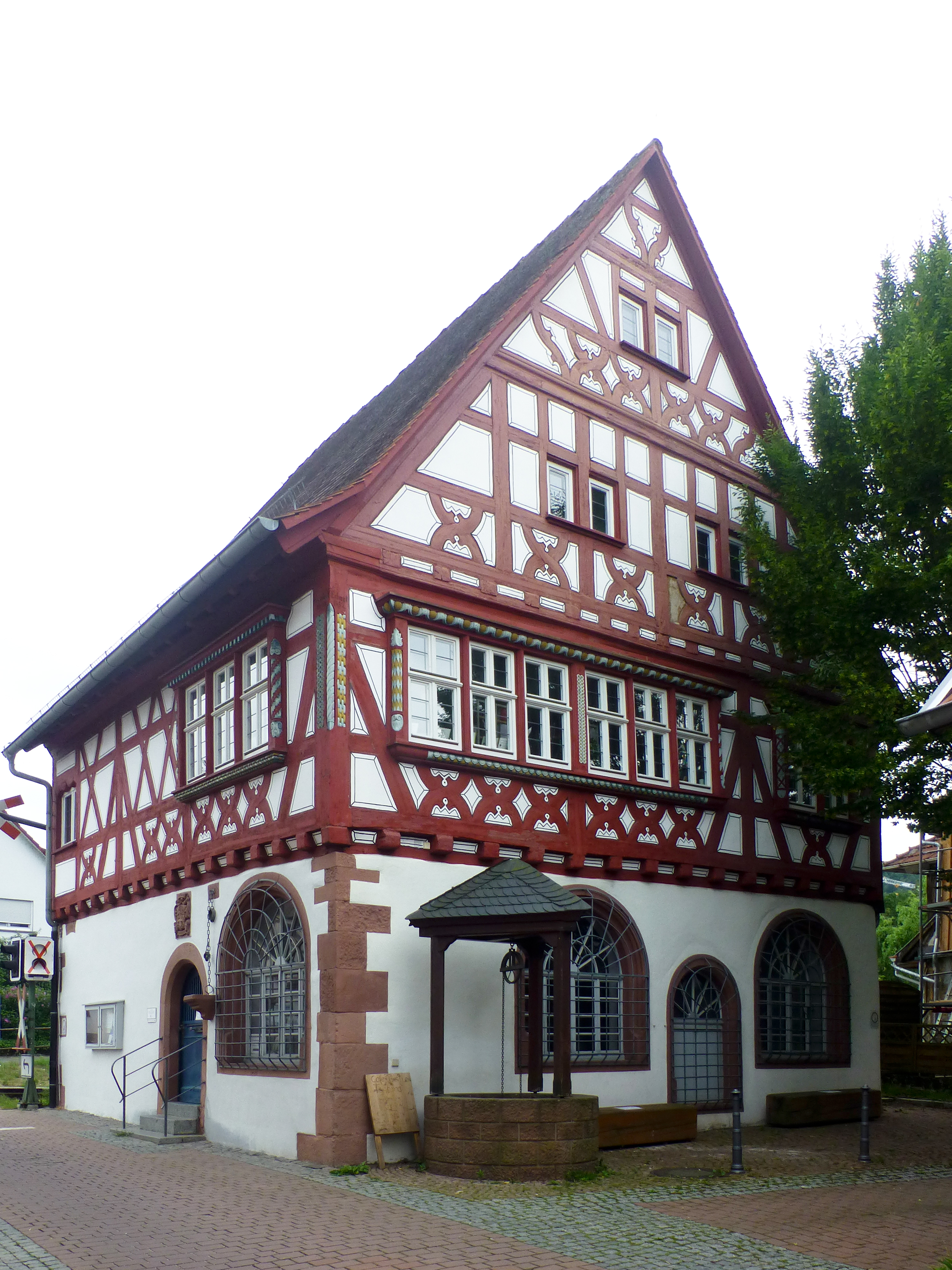
- Town hall

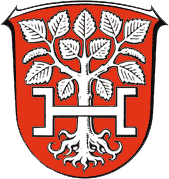
- Coat of arms

- Location of Birkenau within Bergstraße district
- Interactive map of Birkenau
- Location within Germany Location within Hesse
- Coordinates: 49°33′45″N 8°42′25″E
- Country: Germany
- State: Hesse
- Admin. region: Darmstadt
- District: Bergstraße
- Subdivisions: 8 parts

Government
  - Mayor (2021–27): Milan Mapplassary

Area
  - Total: 24.54 km^{2} (9.47 sq mi)
- Elevation: 147 m (482 ft)

Population (2025-12-31)
  - Total: 9,562
  - Density: 389.6/km^{2} (1,009/sq mi)
- Time zone: UTC+01:00 (CET)
  - Summer (DST): UTC+02:00 (CEST)
- Postal codes: 69488
- Dialling codes: 06201, 06209
- Vehicle registration: HP
- Website: www.birkenau.de

Birkenau (German pronunciation: [ˈbɪʁkənaʊ]) in the Odenwald is a municipality in the Bergstraße district in southern Hesse, Germany. Its nickname is Das Dorf der Sonnenuhren – “The Sundial Village”.

== Geography ==
=== Location ===
The community lies in the Weschnitz valley in the Odenwald some 25 km north of Heidelberg and about 20 km northeast of Mannheim. It is on Bundesstraße 38, and the river Weschnitz flows through it. The land is hilly, green and dotted with horse farms and forests.

=== Neighbouring communities ===
Birkenau borders in the north on the community of Mörlenbach, in the east on the community of Abtsteinach, in the south on the community of Gorxheimertal and in the west on the towns of Weinheim and Hemsbach (both in Rhein-Neckar-Kreis in Baden-Württemberg).

=== Constituent communities ===
Birkenau's Ortsteile are Birkenau, Buchklingen, Hornbach, Kallstadt, Löhrbach, Nieder-Liebersbach, Reisen, and Schnorrenbach.

=== Climate ===
Owing to its location near the Bergstraße, a mild climate prevails in Birkenau, which can often be seen in what for Germany is a very early blossoming of almond trees.

== History ==
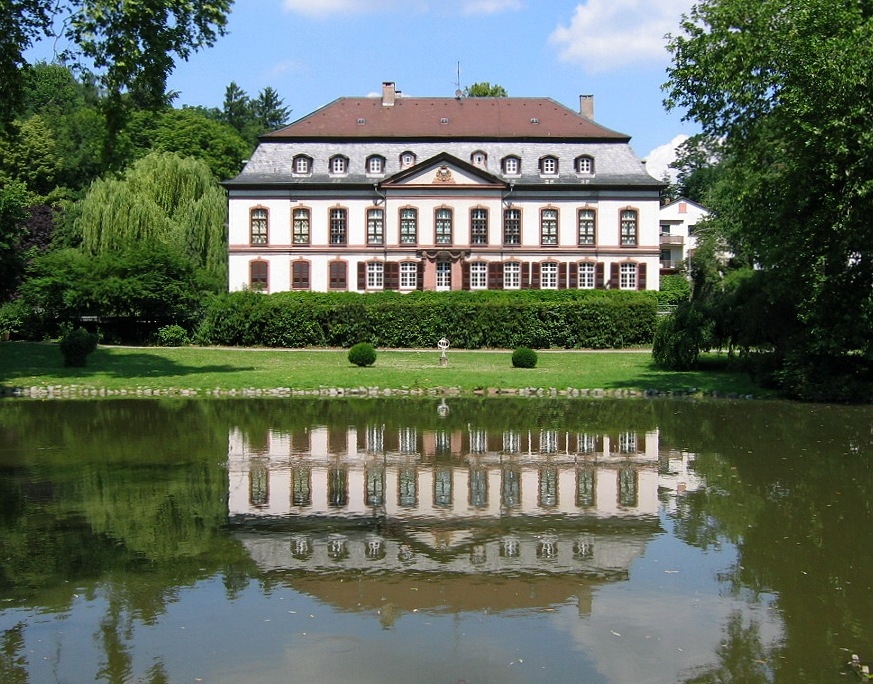
Schloss Birkenau

Birkenau had its first documentary mention in 795 in the Lorsch Codex as a cell of the Lorsch Abbey. As one of the Abbey's holdings, it passed into the ownership of the Archbishopric of Mainz in 1232. The centres of Hornbach and Balzenbach, on the other hand, belonged to the Electorate of the Palatinate, meaning that after the Reformation, they belonged to different denominations. In 1532 the town hall was built, and in 1771 the palace, Schloss Birkenau, of the Lords of Wambolt von Umstadt. By 1964, the population had grown to more than 5,000. In 1967 the community was recognized as a recreational resort (Erholungsort) and in 1979 as an open-air resort (Luftkurort). Owing to the only slight tourism, however, it has not reapplied for this designation. In 1995, Birkenau celebrated its 1,200-year jubilee.

== Politics ==
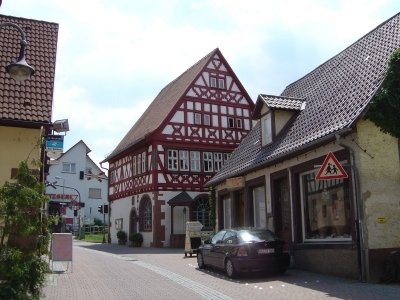
Old Town Hall

=== Community council ===
The municipal election held on 26 March 2006 yielded the following results:

Parties and voter communities		% 2006	Seats; 2006	% 2001	Seats; 2001
CDU	Christian Democratic Union of Germany	35.6	13	37.4	14
SPD	Social Democratic Party of Germany	38.3	14	44.4	16
FDP	Free Democratic Party	5.1	2	4.5	2
FWV	Freie Wählervereinigung Birkenau	21.0	8	13.6	5
Total		100.0	37	100.0	37
Voter turnout in %		52.3		54.4	

=== Town partnerships ===
- La Rochefoucauld, Charente, France

=== Coat of arms ===
The community's arms might be described thus: Gules an uprooted birch tree overlaid with a wall anchor argent.

What the arms, whose charges can be partly traced in tithing seals and boundary stones back to the 16th century, mean is unclear. The charge that the German blazon describes as a “wall anchor” (Maueranker) is not accepted as such by everyone, with some saying it could have been meant to be taken as a weaver's reel. With a document from 22 July 1926, the interior minister of the People's State of Hesse granted the community the right to bear these arms.

== Economy and infrastructure ==
=== Tourism ===
In the Birkenau constituent community of Schnorrenbach there used to be a winter sport area with a 450 m-long downhill skiing slope and a ski lift. In summer, grass skiing was possible. Floodlights have also been installed. The ski lift stopped operating in 2020.

=== Transport ===
Birkenau lies in the area served by the Verkehrsverbund Rhein-Neckar, a transport authority serving the Rhine Neckar Area. Birkenau railway station is on the Weschnitztalbahn (railway; Weinheim–Fürth (Odenwald)). DB Regio AG's Regionalbahn trains stop there hourly, and half-hourly during weekday peak times.

Until 1999, Bundesstraße 38 ran through Birkenau. With the opening of the Saukopftunnel, this road's route has been effectively shifted out of the community; the “old B 38” is now the Landesstraße 3408.

=== Public institutions ===
- Freibad Birkenau (outdoor swimming pool)
- Hallenbad Langenberg (indoor swimming pool)
- Gemeinde und Bürgerhaus (community centre)

=== Education ===
- 7 kindergartens
- 2 primary schools (Sonnenuhrenschule, Grundschule Nieder-Liebersbach)
- 1 Hauptschule-Realschule (Langenbergschule)

== Culture and sightseeing ==
=== Buildings ===
- Historic town hall (1552 – the oldest in Kreis Bergstraße) with pillory and ellwand
- Schloss Birkenau, a Baroque palatial residence with the palace park of the Baron of Wamboldt
- Dorf der Sonnenuhren, the “Sundial Village”, with more than 100 sundials
- Sonnenuhrenschule Birkenau, a primary school

=== Nature ===
Around Birkenau are several nature conservation areas and a considerable number of hiking paths. These are found on the one hand in the woods around Birkenau, but on the other hand, the Höhenweg (“Height Way”, European walking route E1, plateau path between Birkenau and Reisen), for example, is also worth visiting, as there is a striking view over Birkenau and Nieder-Liebersbach.

In Birkenau's woods it is not uncommon to see local wildlife, such as deer, various birds, hares, and so on. Here and there, foxholes are also to be found.

== Sport ==
Nationally known is the TSV Birkenau (gymnastic and sport club) for its team handball division. The team played in the first Bundesliga and in 1974 became the last official German champions in field handball.
