= Mossautal =

- Municipality
- Coat of arms

- Location of Mossautal within Odenwaldkreis district
- Interactive map of Mossautal
- Location within Germany Location within Hesse
- Coordinates: 49°40′29″N 08°55′30″E
- Country: Germany
- State: Hesse
- Admin. region: Darmstadt
- District: Odenwaldkreis
- Subdivisions: 5 Ortsteile

Government
  - Mayor (2019–25): Dietmar Bareis (Ind.)

Area
  - Total: 48.5 km^{2} (18.7 sq mi)
- Elevation: 327 m (1,073 ft)

Population (2025-12-31)
  - Total: 2,426
  - Density: 50.0/km^{2} (130/sq mi)
- Time zone: UTC+01:00 (CET)
  - Summer (DST): UTC+02:00 (CEST)
- Postal codes: 64756
- Dialling codes: 06062, 06061
- Vehicle registration: ERB
- Website: www.mossautal.de

Mossautal in the Odenwald is a municipality and a state-recognized health resort in the Odenwaldkreis (district) in Hesse, Germany.

== Geography ==
=== Location ===
The community lies at elevations of between 300 and 500 m above sea level.

The Nibelungenstraße (Bundesstraße 47) touches Mossautal in the north and the Siegfriedstraße (Bundesstraße 460) runs through the community in the south. The surrounding countryside is also used as a holiday destination in the UNESCO Geo-Naturpark Bergstraße-Odenwald on the Marbach Reservoir, the Odenwald's biggest body of standing water.

Mossautal is well known as a textbook example of a Waldhufendorf ("forest village").

=== Neighbouring communities ===
Mossautal borders in the north on the community of Reichelsheim and the town of Michelstadt, in the east on the town of Erbach, in the south on the town of Beerfelden (all in the Odenwaldkreis), and in the west on the communities of Wald-Michelbach, Grasellenbach and Fürth (all three in the Bergstraße district).

=== Constituent communities ===
Mossautal's Ortsteile are Güttersbach, Hiltersklingen, Hüttenthal, Ober-Mossau and Unter-Mossau (the community's administrative seat).

== Politics ==
=== Municipal council ===
Composition of the municipal council
Parties and voter communities		Seats; 2006	Seats; 2016
CDU	Christian Democratic Union of Germany	4	3
SPD	Social Democratic Party of Germany	4	3
ÜWG	Überparteiliche Wählergemeinschaft Mossautal	7	9
Total		15	15
Voter turnout in %		58.5	57.0

=== Mayor ===
At the mayoral election on 25 April 2004, the independent Willi Keil, who had been in the mayor's office since 1986, was reelected unopposed with 97.2% of the vote. In September 2013 Dietmar Bareis (independent) was elected the new mayor with 95.9% of the votes.

=== Coat of arms ===
The community's arms might heraldically be described thus: Party per saltire, above gules a Hiberno-Scottish cross (called an Iroschottenkreuz in the German blazon) argent, below gules a Maltese cross argent, dexter and sinister argent a mullet of six gules.

=== Town partnerships ===
Maasdam, South Holland, Netherlands

== Culture and sightseeing ==
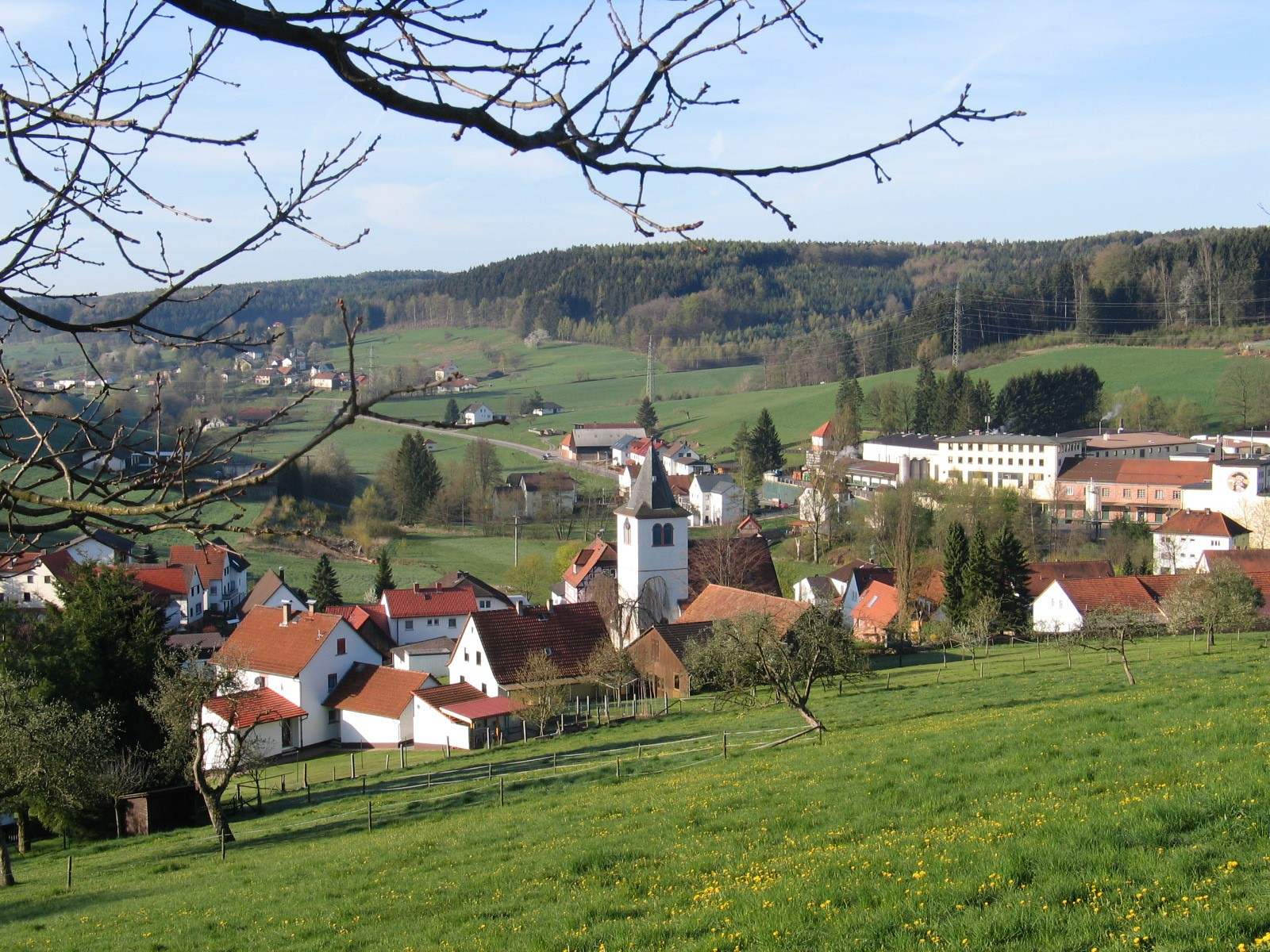
Ober-Mossau

=== Sightseeing ===
- Marbach Reservoir
- Johanniterkirche in Ober-Mossau (Evangelical, founded by the Order of Saint John)
- Quellkirche in Güttersbach (“spring church”)
- Siegfriedsbrunnen/Lindelbrunnen in Hüttenthal (spring)

=== Regular events ===
- IVV – Volkswanderung (“people’s hike”); each year on the first weekend in April
- Countryfest der Greenhorns; each year on 1 May at the leisure facility in Hiltersklingen
- Günter-Ihrig-Gedächtnisturnier; each year at Corpus Christi on the sporting field in Hiltersklingen a football tournament for amateur teams is held.
- Schmucker Open-Air; each year on the last weekend in July an open-air festival is held at the Schmucker Private Brewery's premises.
- Volkslauf Güttersbach; each year on the first weekend in August there is a “public walk” for everybody, with two different courses.
- Hiltersklinger Quetschekerwe; each year on the third weekend in August a church consecration festival is held at the leisure facility in Hiltersklingen.
- Hof- und Dreschfest; each year on the third weekend in August there is a “farm and threshing festival” at Miedtke Farm in Hüttenthal.
- Landerleben; every three years in September the community of Mossautal presents its businesses. There are also various leisure activities.

== Economy ==
The community's livelihood comes from, for example, tourism in the form of holiday homes, conference hotels and guesthouses. There are also a brewery and a dairy on hand. Furthermore, fish farming earns some income. The main industry is now, as it has always been, agriculture and forestry.

== Sport ==
Mossautal is home to the SG Mossautal football team. The players come from SV (Sportverein, “sport club”) 54 Mossau and SV 67 Hiltersklingen.
