= Lindenfels =

- Town
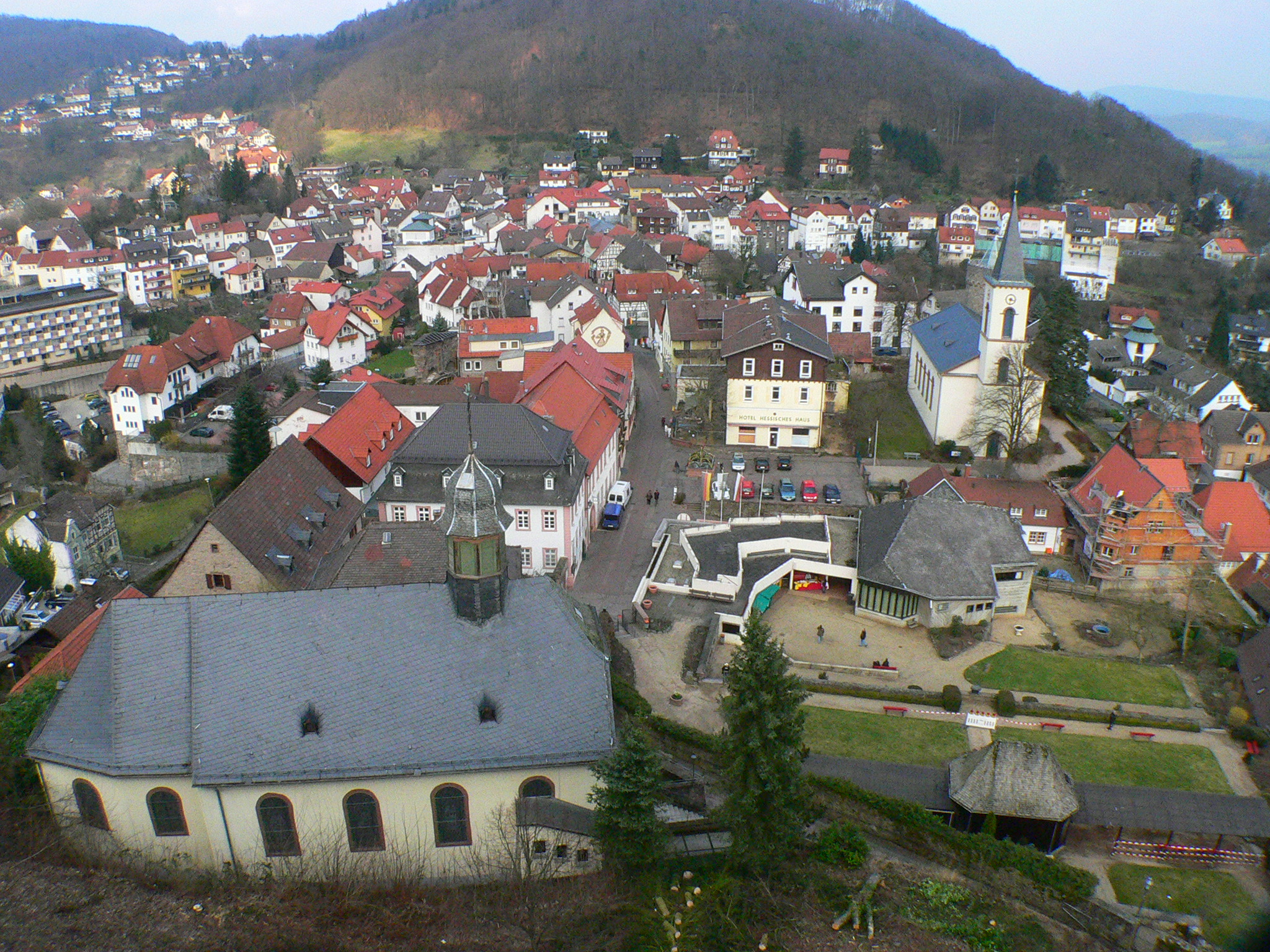
- View of the town

- Coat of arms

- Location of Lindenfels within Bergstraße district
- Interactive map of Lindenfels
- Location within Germany Location within Hesse
- Coordinates: 49°41′N 8°47′E
- Country: Germany
- State: Hesse
- Admin. region: Darmstadt
- District: Bergstraße
- Subdivisions: 7

Government
  - Mayor (2018–24): Michael Helbig

Area
  - Total: 21.09 km^{2} (8.14 sq mi)
- Elevation: 364 m (1,194 ft)

Population (2025-12-31)
  - Total: 5,019
  - Density: 238.0/km^{2} (616.4/sq mi)
- Time zone: UTC+01:00 (CET)
  - Summer (DST): UTC+02:00 (CEST)
- Postal codes: 64678, 64658 (Faustenbach)
- Dialling codes: 06255, 06254 (Kolmbach
- Vehicle registration: HP
- Website: www.lindenfels.de

Lindenfels (German pronunciation: [ˈlɪndn̩fɛls]) is a town in the Bergstraße district in Hesse, Germany.

== Geography ==
=== Location ===
The climatic spa, also known as the “Pearl of the Odenwald”, lies in the Odenwald in southern Hesse and is nestled in a mountain landscape with a great deal of woodland.

=== Neighbouring communities ===
Lindenfels borders in the south on the communities of Modautal and Fischbachtal (both in Darmstadt-Dieburg), in the northeast on the community of Fränkisch-Crumbach, in the east on the community of Reichelsheim (both in the Odenwaldkreis), in the south on the community of Fürth, and in the west on the community of Lautertal.

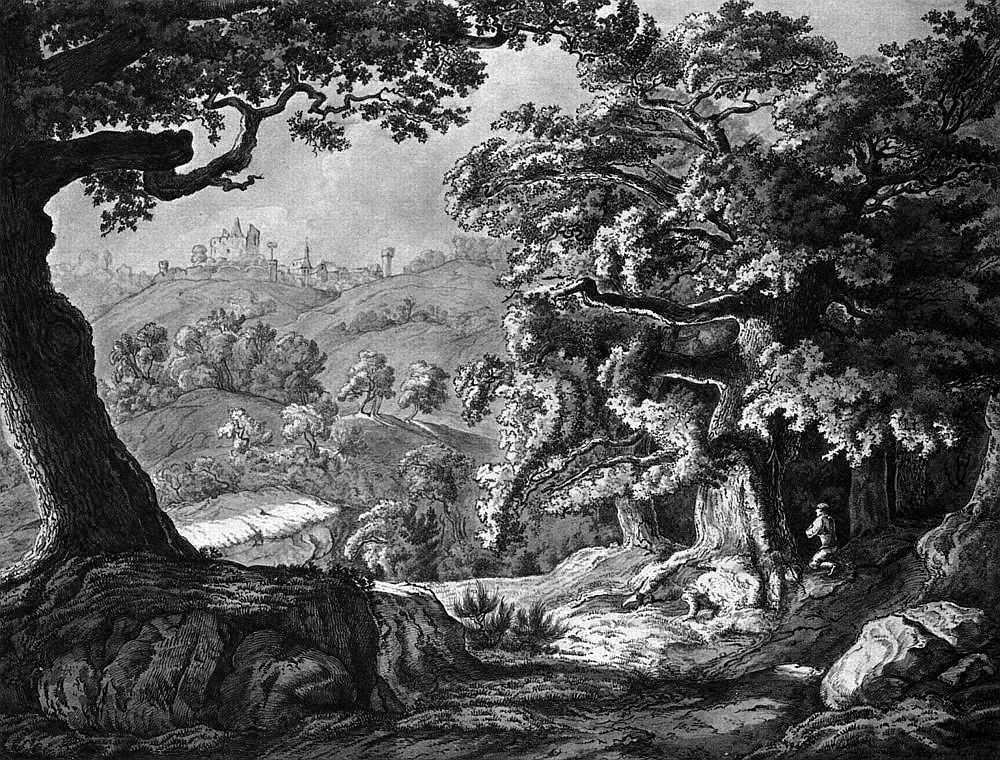
View of Lindenfels about 1812

=== Constituent communities ===
Lindenfels has outlying centres named Eulsbach, Glattbach, Kolmbach, Schlierbach, Seidenbuch, Winkel and Winterkasten.

== History ==
In 1123, Lindenfels had its first documentary mention as a holding of the Lorsch Abbey. After that, the town belonged for nearly 600 years to the Electorate of the Palatinate. In 1336, Emperor Ludwig IV granted Lindenfels town and market rights. In 1802, after the Electorate of the Palatinate’s downfall, Lindenfels passed to the Grand Duchy of Hesse and was from 1821 to 1832 seat of the Landratsbezirk of Lindenfels. Later, from 1852 to 1874, it was the seat of the Lindenfels district.

After the Second World War ended in May 1945, Lindenfels found itself in the American Zone of Occupation. The US military administration built a displaced persons camp to house displaced Jews. The camp was dissolved in 1948.

The designation heilklimatischer Kurort (“climatic spa”) was granted Lindenfels in 1969.

== Politics ==
=== Community council ===
The municipal election held on 26 March 2006 yielded the following results:

Parties and voter communities		% 2006	Seats; 2006	% 2001	Seats; 2001
SPD	Social Democratic Party of Germany	38.3	12	37.3	12
GREENS	Bündnis 90/Die Grünen	8.7	3	8.1	2
FDP	Free Democratic Party	6.2	2	5.3	2
LWG/CDU	Lindenfelser Wählergemeinschaft/ Christian Democratic Union of Germany	46.9	14	49.3	15
Total		100	31	100	31
Voter turnout in %		52.1		68.6	

=== Mayor ===
- 2001–2013: Oliver Hoeppner (LWG/CDU)
- 2013-incumbent: Michael Helbig

=== Town partnerships ===
- Moëlan-sur-Mer, Finistère, France since 1968
- Pawłowiczki, Opole Voivodeship, Poland since 1998

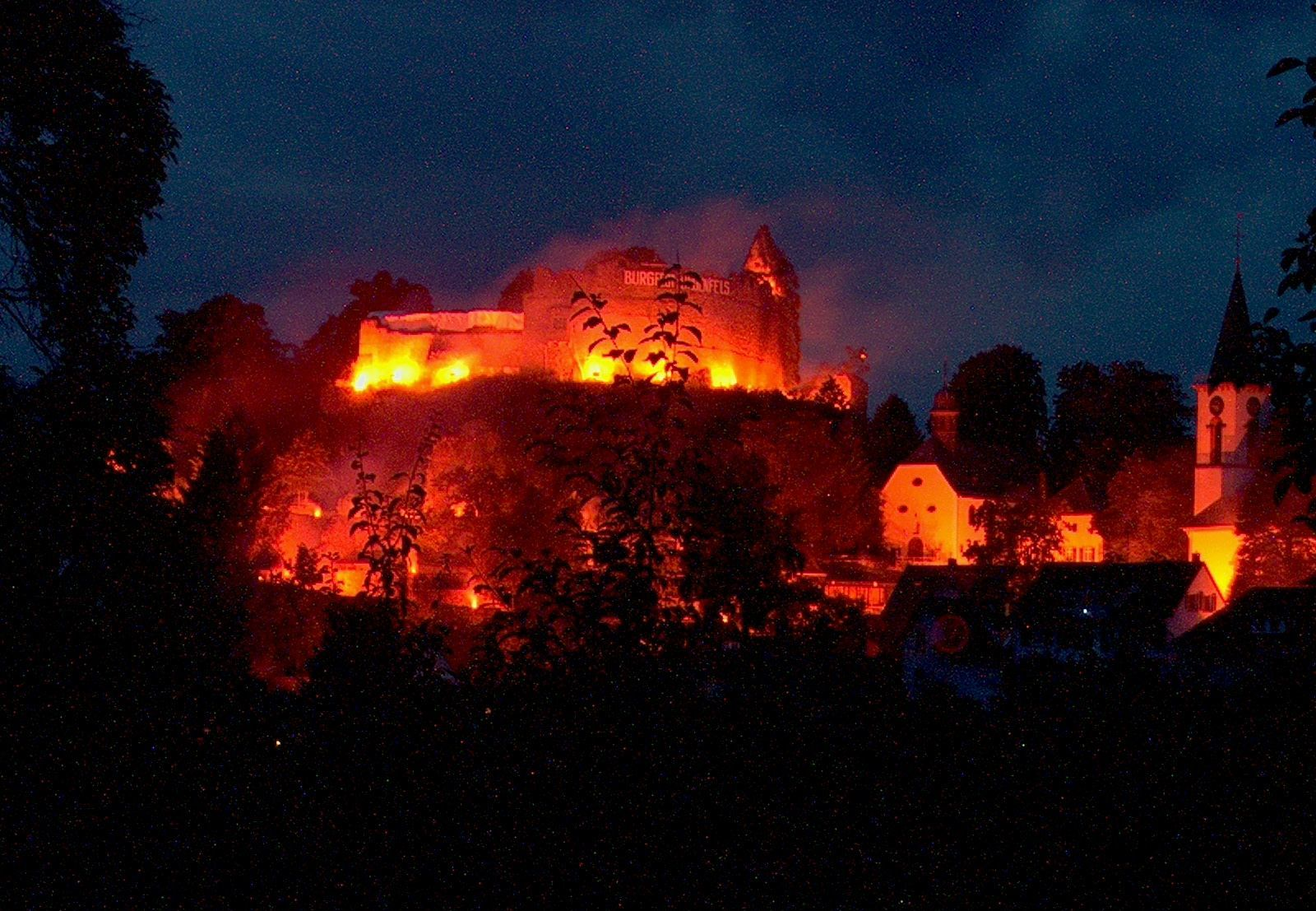
Castle floodlighting at Burgfest (“Castle Festival”)

== Regular events ==
Among the most important yearly events held in town are:

- the traditional Burg- und Trachtenfest (“Castle and Costume Festival”) on the first weekend in August, with fireworks, parade and folk festival at the castle;
- the Mittelalterliche Spektakulum (“Mediaeval Spectacle”) in May, with knightly games;
- Brauchtumstage (“Custom Days”) in October, at which old Odenwald customs and arts and crafts are presented.

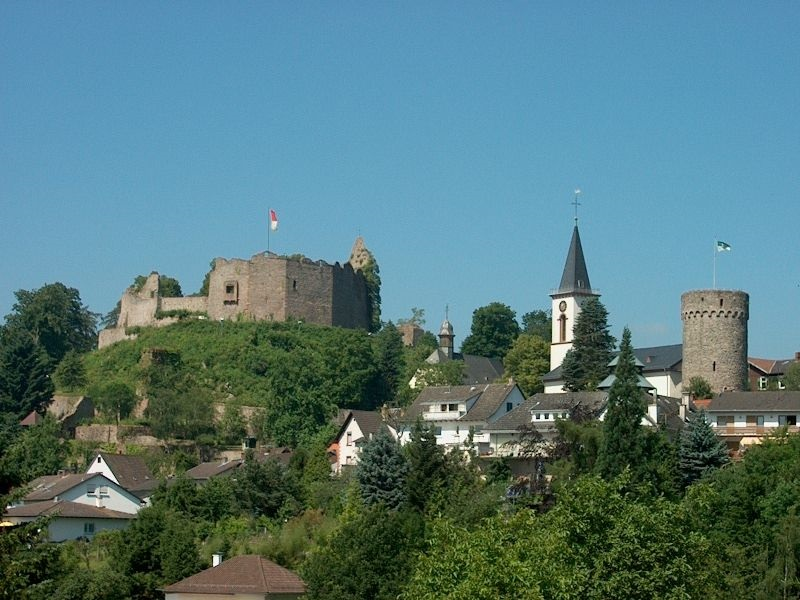
Castle, Catholic and Evangelical churches, Bürgerturm (tower)

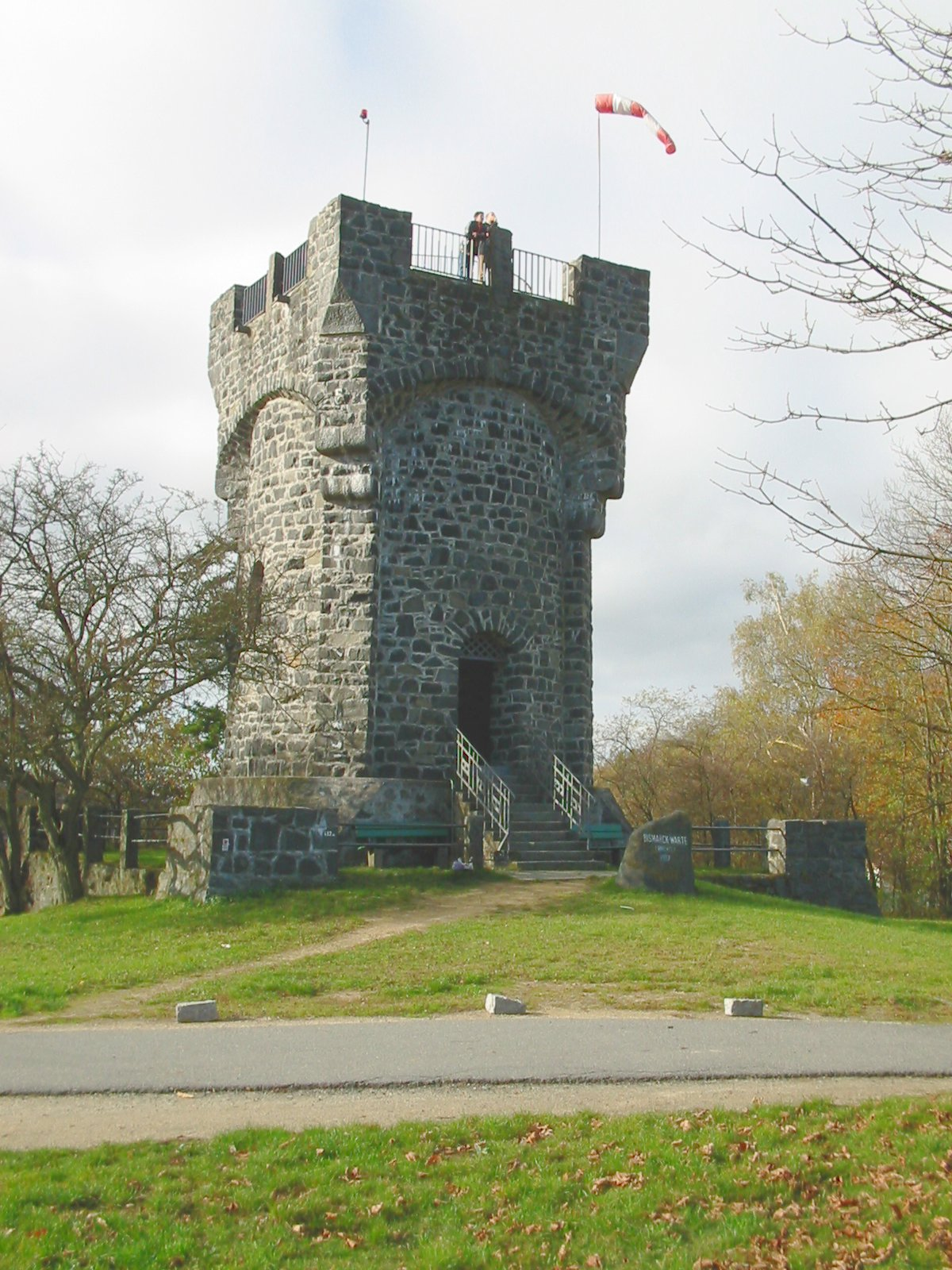
The Bismarck Lookout

== Buildings ==
- In the middle of town stand the Lindenfels castle ruins, which today serve as a popular outing destination. There is also a view into the distance over the Weschnitz valley.
- The Bismarck-Warte – one of many Bismarck memorial towers – is found on the Litzelröder Höhe (heights), 452 m above sea level. It was built in 1906 and 1907 by the Verschönerungs- und Verkehrsverein (“Beautification and Transport Club”) and Odenwaldklub Lindenfels. The tower is 12.3 m tall and freely open to the public. In 1997 and 1998, the tower was thoroughly restored. Up a stairway inside, one can reach the visitable platform which affords an enjoyable view worthy of seeing of the valleys around Lindenfels.
- Further sights worthy of seeing are the house Baur de Betaz, the inner and outer Fürther Tor (gate) and various timber-frame houses and Baroque buildings, which line the pedestrian precinct towards the castle (among these are the Town Hall and the Catholic church).
- Near Lindenfels on the Krehberg (mountain) at position 49°41′03″N 08°43′50″E is found a 122 m-tall transmission tower run by Deutsche Telekom AG for VHF and microwave relay. The said tower consists of a freestanding steel-lattice base upon which a guyed transmission mast is mounted.

== Famous people ==
=== Sons and daughters of the town ===
- Thomas Heinze (b. 30 March 1964), actor
- Timo Glock (b. 18 March 1982), Formula One racer
- Sebastian Kneißl (b. 13 January 1983), German footballer
