= Fränkisch-Crumbach =

- Municipality
- Coat of arms

- Location of Fränkisch-Crumbach within Odenwaldkreis district
- Interactive map of Fränkisch-Crumbach
- Location within Germany Location within Hesse
- Coordinates: 49°45′N 08°52′E
- Country: Germany
- State: Hesse
- Admin. region: Darmstadt
- District: Odenwaldkreis

Government
  - Mayor (2023–29): Matthias Horlacher (SPD)

Area
  - Total: 16.1 km^{2} (6.2 sq mi)
- Elevation: 190–500 m (620–1,640 ft)

Population (2025-12-31)
  - Total: 2,895
  - Density: 180/km^{2} (466/sq mi)
- Time zone: UTC+01:00 (CET)
  - Summer (DST): UTC+02:00 (CEST)
- Postal codes: 64407
- Dialling codes: 06164
- Vehicle registration: ERB
- Website: www.fraenkisch-crumbach.de

Fränkisch-Crumbach is a municipality in the Odenwaldkreis (district) in Hesse, Germany.

== History ==
=== Documented references ===
The oldest surviving documentary reference to Crumbach dates back to 1148. Other historically documented forms of the name are Crumpach (1219, 1372, 1433), Krumppach (1434) and Crumbach (1653). The form Fränkisch-Crumbach has been in use since 1822.

=== Middle Ages ===
Up until 1806, the village officially belonged to the Rodensteiner Mark as the Lordship of Crumbach and initially to the Lords of Rodenstein, who called themselves Lords of Crumbach before Rodenstein Castle was built around the middle of the 13th century. Rodenstein Castle alongside the town of Fränkisch-Crumbach formed the centre of the Crumbach-Rodenstein dominion.

In the 13th century, the Lords of Rodenstein split off from the Crumbach family. The first Rodensteiner who is definitely attested is the archbishop's chamberlain and canon Heinrich (* 1293; † 1317 ) of Mainz.

The county of Katzenelnbogen had been involved in the castle from the very beginning. The village had its own cent with an allodial cent court and high jurisdiction for Crumbach with Bierbach, Erlau, Güttersbach and Michelbach. The parish of Crumbach was first documented in 1327, the church dedicated to St. Laurentius dates back to the 13th century and served as the burial place of the lords of Crumbach and Rodenstein from the very beginning, burials can be traced from 1470. Hans III zu Rodenstein had a new Gothic choir built by Konrad von Mosbach in 1485. The family burial site in the Franconian-Crumbach church, which has been largely preserved, is considered an important source for the history of the Rodensteiners in terms of art history.

Since the High Middle Ages, the small lordship of Franconian-Crumbach was caught in a conflict between the Counts of Katzenelnbogen, later the Landgraves of Hesse-Darmstadt as their heirs on the one hand, and the Schenken of Erbach and the Electorate of the Palatinate on the other. Within this framework, the Rodensteiners managed to establish a largely independent, small territory with the core area in the Gersprenz valley.

=== Early Modern Period and Thirty Years' War ===
The Upper Hessian Lißberg line of the Rodenstein family died out in 1470 with the death of Engelhard von Rodenstein-Lißberg. The property then passed to Hans III von Rodenstein, who in 1471, at the age of 53, had married his fourteen-year-old relative Anna von Rodenstein-Lißberg. The couple had at least three children, his successor Hans IV (also called Hans the Younger, gravestone in the choir of the Fränkisch-Crumbach church), another son Georg and a daughter Margarete. Both of the latter children became clergy.

The family's social decline followed after his death in 1500. The castle had been entirely owned by the Counts of Katzenelnbogen since 1422, and decades before that, more and more shares had to be mortaged and sold. In 1436, Count Johann IV von Katzenelnbogen finally enfeoffed Hans II von Rodenstein-Lißberg with the half of the castle that had previously been owned by the Rodenstein family.

Since the 14th century, marriages only took place in the lowest class of the non-princely nobility, which was represented by the Schenken von Erbach, the Lords of Frankenstein and the Lords of Lißberg. However, marriages with knightly noble families dominated. After the death of Hans III of Rodenstein in 1555, the possessions of the old Lordship of Rodenstein fell to his sons George III and Hans V.

After 1570, Hans V and his nephew Philipp III introduced the Reformation into the Rodenstein domain and appointed Johannes Busch, the first Lutheran pastor, to Crumbach in 1579. Philipp III and his wife Margarete von Habern built a stately home right next to the church of Crumbach, which was completed in 1574; his uncle Hans V stayed mainly at Rodenstein Castle.

Around 90% of the population of Crumbach died in the Thirty Years' War, and Rodenstein Castle fell into disrepair after 1635. The people of Rodenstein lived in the castle until 1635, when Adam von Rodenstein and his family died of the plague during the Thirty Years' War. The castle was no longer inhabited after that, fell into disrepair and became a quarry and depot for private buildings. After Adam's death, half of his property went to his sister and was sold to Landgrave George II of Hesse-Darmstadt. One quarter belonged to Georg Friedrich von Rodenstein and one quarter of the town to Lieutenant General Carl von Rabenhaupt. In the course of recruiting new citizens, Rabenhaupt had brought predominantly Calvinist immigrants to Crumbach; they should have the right to use the church for their services. This displeased Landgrave George II and Georg Friedrich von Rodenstein, whose subjects were Lutheran. In order to ensure unhindered access, von Rabenhaupt had palisades built around the entrance to the church and to protect the prison in 1650. The population had consolidated to such an extent in the three decades after the end of the war that on 8 January 1684 the common ordinance of 1594 was re-established and confirmed. This 44-page village ordinance, which standardised common land, forest, pasture and interest rights, only referred to Crumbach, not to Bierbach, Eberbach, Erlau, Güttersbach and Michelbach. These hamlets had their own regulations. According to the Weistum of 1457, eleven villages belonged to the Rodensteiner Mark cooperative, in addition to Fränkisch-Crumbach among others. also Bierbach, Eberbach, Güttersbach and Michelbach. The Lords of Rodenstein were the Obermärker. As a result of financial difficulties, large parts of the district of Fränkisch-Crumbach, including hunting rights in the Rodensteiner Mark, were taken over by the Landgraviate of Hesse-Darmstadt.

=== Until the end of the Gemmingen rule ===
Weiprecht Freiherr von Gemmingen-Hornberg was director of the Franconian Imperial Knighthood, knight captain of the canton of Odenwald and court judge in Heidelberg. In 1678 he was appointed head of the rent chamber in Darmstadt by the widow of the Landgravine Elisabeth Dorothea of Hesse-Darmstadt and in 1693 he chose Crumbach as the seat of his family. He had taken over part of the town from the Rodenstein inheritance through his marriage in 1693 to Maria Dorothea, widow of Carl von Rabenhaupt. He continued to support the settlement of Calvinist Waldensians and Jewish citizens. Johann Rudolf Victor von Pretlack rose to the highest military offices in the service of the Darmstadt Landgrave Ernst Ludwig and was able to acquire the Hesse-Darmstadt fief, the former Rodenstein property. After the death of his first wife, he married Christiane Margarethe von Bernstorff on 24 April 1715 in Frankfurt am Main, whose mother Agnes Maria von Haxthausen, née von Kamptz, was an heiress of the last Rodenstein family. Christiane Margarethe's grandmother Anna Maria Bibiana von Rodenstein was thus the last bearer of the name of this family. In 1719, after the purchase of neighbouring farms and gardens, the Pretlack Castle with a large park was built in about six years. From 1740, five markets were allowed to be held in Crumbach. The Pretlack Castle was purchased in 1858 by the municipality, which set it up as a schoolhouse and mayor's office. It still serves the municipal administration as the town hall today.

=== In the Grand Duchy of Hesse-Darmstadt ===
When the Landgraviate of Hesse-Darmstadt joined the Napoleonic Confederation of the Rhine in 1806, it also became the Grand Duchy of Hesse and received the immediate rule of Gemmingen and Franconian-Crumbach. In 1821 or earlier, the Grand Duchy concluded a treaty with the Lords of Gemmingen, who left the patrimonial court to the state. During the administrative reform of 1821, the Grand Duchy was able to incorporate Franconian-Crumbach into the district administration district of Reinheim and the judicial district of the Lichtenberg district court. The court of second instance was the Darmstadt court. This was followed by:

- from 1848: Reinheim Regional Court (transfer to Reinheim), second instance: Darmstadt Court of Appeal
- from 1879: District Court of Reinheim, second instance: Regional Court of Darmstadt
- from 1968: Darmstadt District Court with the dissolution of the Reinheim District Court, second instance: Darmstadt Regional Court

The form Fränkisch-Crumbach has been in use since 1822. The additional name derives from the fact that the Lordship of Gemmingen belonged to the Franconian Imperial Knighthood and was used in the Grand Duchy to differentiate it from Crumbach am Mümling Valley, which belonged to the Lordship of Breuberg before 1806.

Fränkisch-Crumbach belonged to the area of common law, which applied here without the overlay of particular law. This remained valid even during the membership of the Grand Duchy of Hesse in the 19th century, until it was replaced on January 1, 1900, by the Civil Code, which was uniformly applicable throughout the German Empire.

=== 20th century ===
Until the administrative reform in Hesse, the municipality belonged to the Dieburg district. On 1 August 1972, Fränkisch-Crumbach was incorporated into the Odenwald district together with Brensbach.

Until 2014, the place was a recognized recreational and health area/resort.

=== Judaism in Fränkisch Crumbach ===
There were only a few Jewish families in the 18th century. This changed in the 19th century. The community grew from 39 families in 1807 to 108 in 1880. The cigar manufacturer Moritz Oppenheimer was well known. The Jewish cemetery in Michelstadt was initially used as a burial place, and from 1850 onwards the new cemetery in Reichelsheim. In 1874 the Jewish community inaugurated a synagogue with a mikveh on Erbacher Strasse. There were anti-Semitic riots in 1848. During the Nazi era, the town's Jews were completely deported and expelled. Yad Vashem documents 19 murdered Jews from Fränkisch Crumbach. On a plot of land opposite the former synagogue, a boulder with an inscription has commemorated the former Jewish community since 1991.

The town also participates since 10 February 2022 in the artistic project started by Gunter Demnig and known as "stolpersteine" which commemorates the victims of the Nazi era by embedding brass memorial plaques in the sidewalk in front of their last chosen place of residence.

=== Recent efforts to valorise the local cultural and historical heritage ===
Recently the town in order to valorise its cultural and historical heritage announced in October 2021 the inauguration of the "Pfad der Sagen" ("Path of Legends") project. The experience starts is a walk-tour that visits various cultural and historical sites significant to the town. The tour starts in the town center via the Rodenstein Castle ruins all the way to the Laudenau "Freiheit" and back. Tourists are able to enhance their experience using informative boards along the path that offer audio and video-guides that can be accessed through the use of a mobile phone and allow a video tour of the virtually reconstructed castle. This was made possible with the collaboration of the Rodenstein Museum eV association, together with the Geo-Nature Park Bergstrasse-Odenwald and the municipality. Federal funding from the federal government were also given through the "Neustart Kultur" program, which made it possible to realize two more parts: a legend trail for children with age-appropriate stories and new information boards on the historic buildings and an entertaining tour of the town. All three routes are part of our digitized hiking trails on the Internet and can be seen and heard there. The "Pfad der Sagen" was inaugurated with a small ceremony at the castle ruins on Friday, October 15, 2022, at 2 p.m.

== Geography ==
=== Location ===
Fränkisch-Crumbach is located in the Vorderer Odenwald on both sides of the Crumbach, a left western tributary of the Gersprenz, which flows into the Stockstadt am Main. The municipality is located in the Hessian part of Franconia. The district is quite large, with over 16 square kilometers, of which 524 hectares are forested, stretches from the Gersprenz bank in the east to the Rimdidim (499 m) in the west and includes the ruins of Rodenstein Castle and a number of hamlets and residential areas, such as Bierbach, Eberbach, Erlau, Güttersbach, Höllerheck, Holzwiese, Meierei, Michelbach, Rodenstein and Schleiersbach. Fränkisch-Crumbach only includes the district of the same name (Gmk.-Nr. 63125) and is the only municipality in the Odenwaldkreis without incorporated districts. It was not changed as part of the regional reform in Hesse.

=== Neighbouring communities ===
Fränkisch-Crumbach borders in the northeast on the community of Brensbach, in the southeast on the community of Reichelsheim (both in the Odenwaldkreis), in the west on the town of Lindenfels (Kreis Bergstraße), in the northwest on the community of Fischbachtal and in the north on the town of Groß-Bieberau (both in Darmstadt-Dieburg).

== Politics ==
The municipal election held on 26 March 2006 yielded the following results:

Parties and voter communities		% 2006	Seats; 2006	% 2001	Seats; 2001
CDU	Christian Democratic Union of Germany	38.6	9	34.9	8
SPD	Social Democratic Party of Germany	54.9	13	50.1	12
GREENS	Bündnis 90/Die Grünen	6.5	1	7.7	2
ULF	Unabhängige Liste Fränkisch-Crumbach	–	–	4.8	1
FDP	Free Democratic Party	–	–	2.6	0
Total		100.0	23	100.0	23
Voter turnout in %		64.3		73.6	

=== Mayor ===
Mayor Matthias Horlacher (SPD) was elected on 12 March 2023.

== Culture and sightseeing ==
=== Buildings ===
- The Evangelical Church of Saint Lawrence (Kirche St. Laurentius) is built in the Romanesque style. It was given a steeple and a quire with rib vaulting in 1485. Worthy of note are the epitaphs, some of which come from the Renaissance.
- The Rodenstein Castle ruins, built about 1250
- The tomb of the Barons of Gemmingen on the main street
- The Schnellerts Castle ruins a few kilometres away.

== Economy and infrastructure ==
=== Transport ===
The community is linked to the long-distance road network by Bundesstraße 38 (Weinheim–Roßdorf).
