= Höchst im Odenwald =

- Municipality
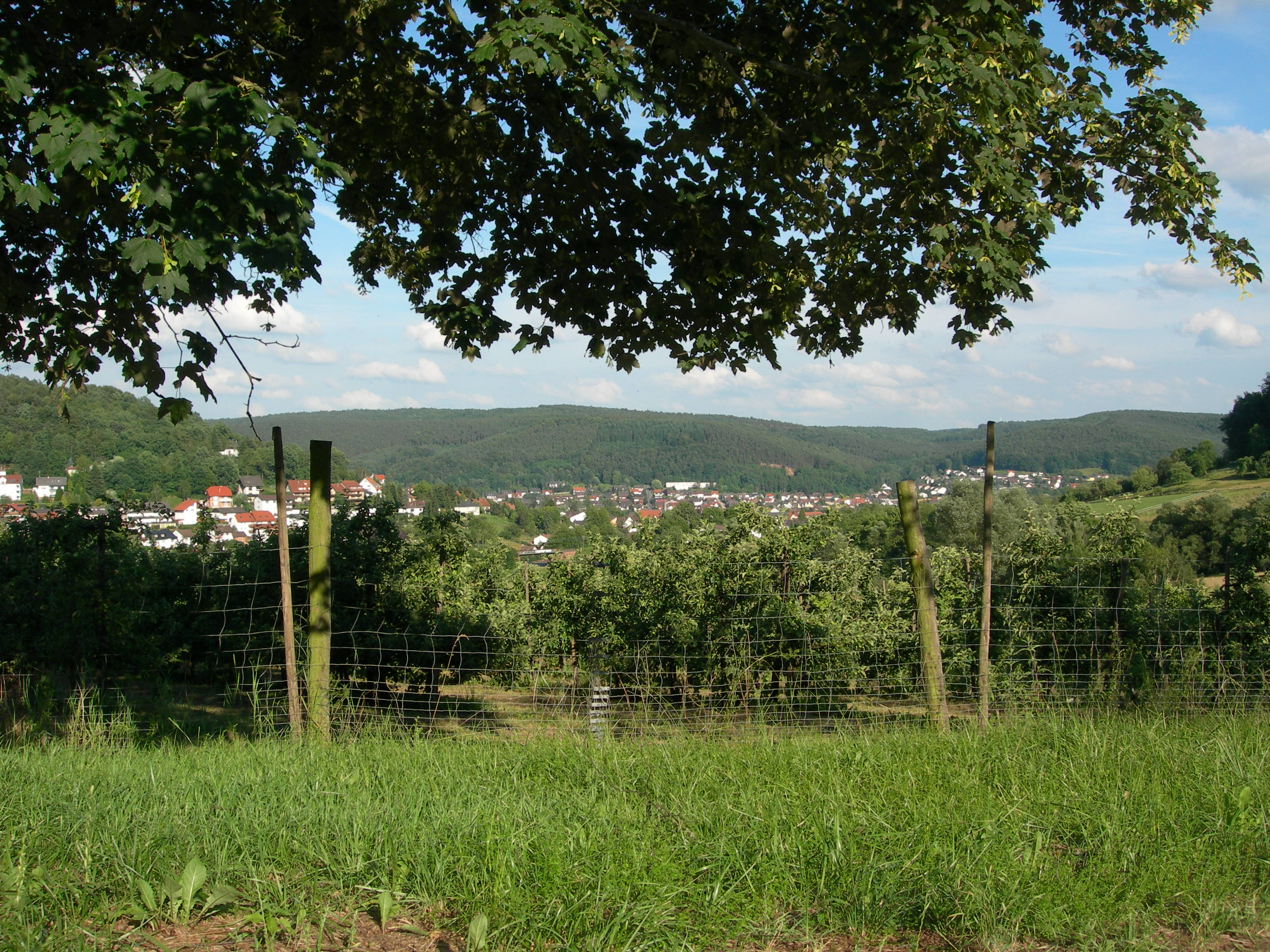
- Höchst im Odenwald seen from the northeast

- Coat of arms

- Location of Höchst im Odenwald within Odenwaldkreis district
- Interactive map of Höchst im Odenwald
- Location within Germany Location within Hesse
- Coordinates: 49°48′N 09°00′E
- Country: Germany
- State: Hesse
- Admin. region: Darmstadt
- District: Odenwaldkreis

Government
  - Mayor (2023–29): Jens Fröhlich

Area
  - Total: 30.51 km^{2} (11.78 sq mi)
- Elevation: 177 m (581 ft)

Population (2025-12-31)
  - Total: 9,751
  - Density: 319.6/km^{2} (827.8/sq mi)
- Time zone: UTC+01:00 (CET)
  - Summer (DST): UTC+02:00 (CEST)
- Postal codes: 64739
- Dialling codes: 06163
- Vehicle registration: ERB
- Website: www.hoechst-i-odw.de

Höchst im Odenwald (officially Höchst i. Odw.) is a municipality in the Odenwaldkreis (district) in Hesse, Germany.

== Geography ==
=== Location ===
Höchst lies 25 km east of Darmstadt, in the northern Odenwald at elevations between 175 and 400 m.

=== Neighbouring communities ===
Höchst borders in the north on the town of Groß-Umstadt (Darmstadt-Dieburg) and the town of Breuberg, in the east on the community of Lützelbach, in the south on the town of Bad König, in the southwest on the community of Brensbach and in the west on the community of Otzberg (Darmstadt-Dieburg).

=== Constituent communities ===
Höchst's Ortsteile, besides the main centre, also called Höchst, are Annelsbach, Dusenbach, Forstel, Hassenroth i.Odw., Hetschbach, Hummetroth, Mümling-Grumbach and Pfirschbach.

== History ==
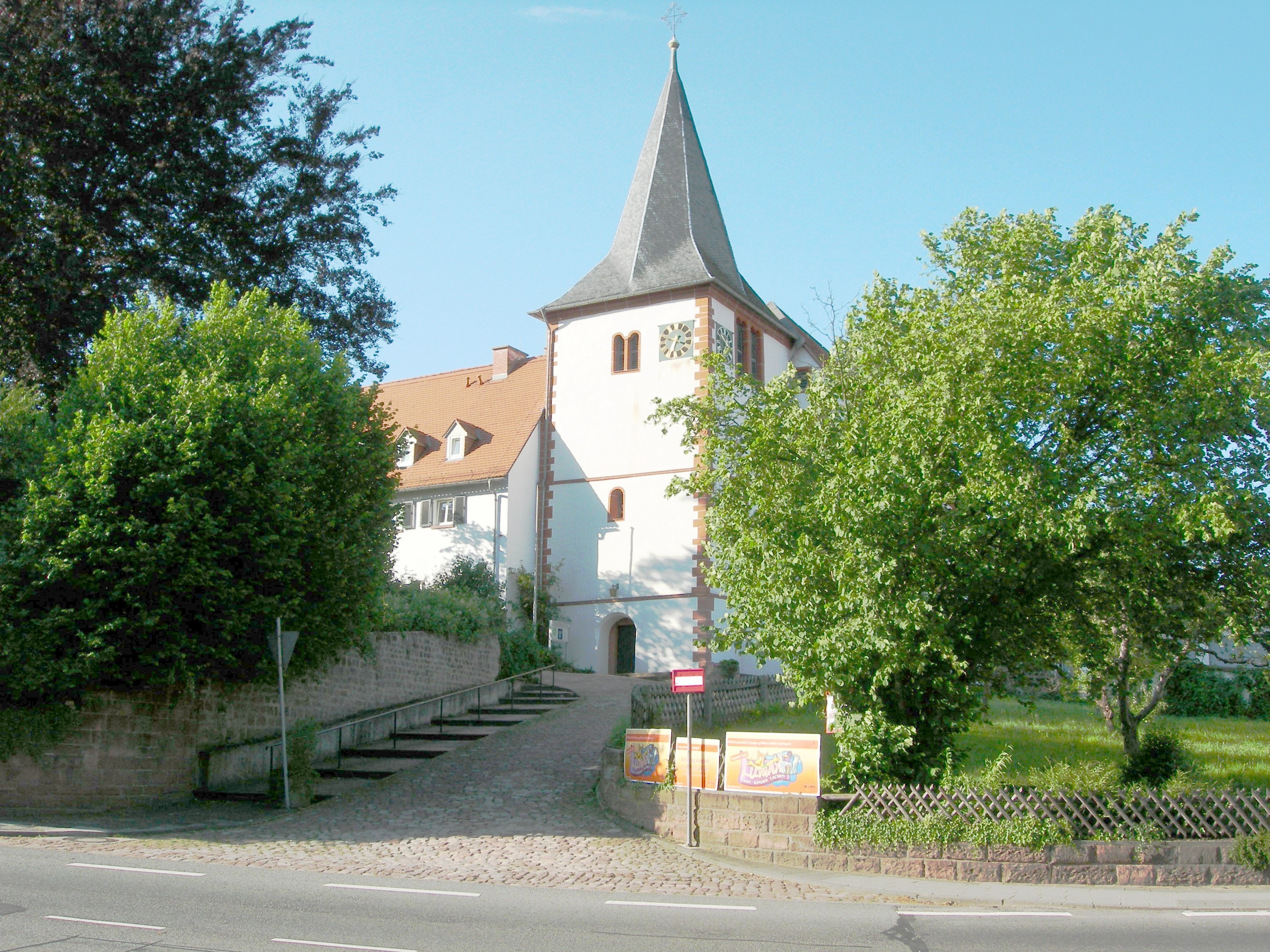
Evangelical church

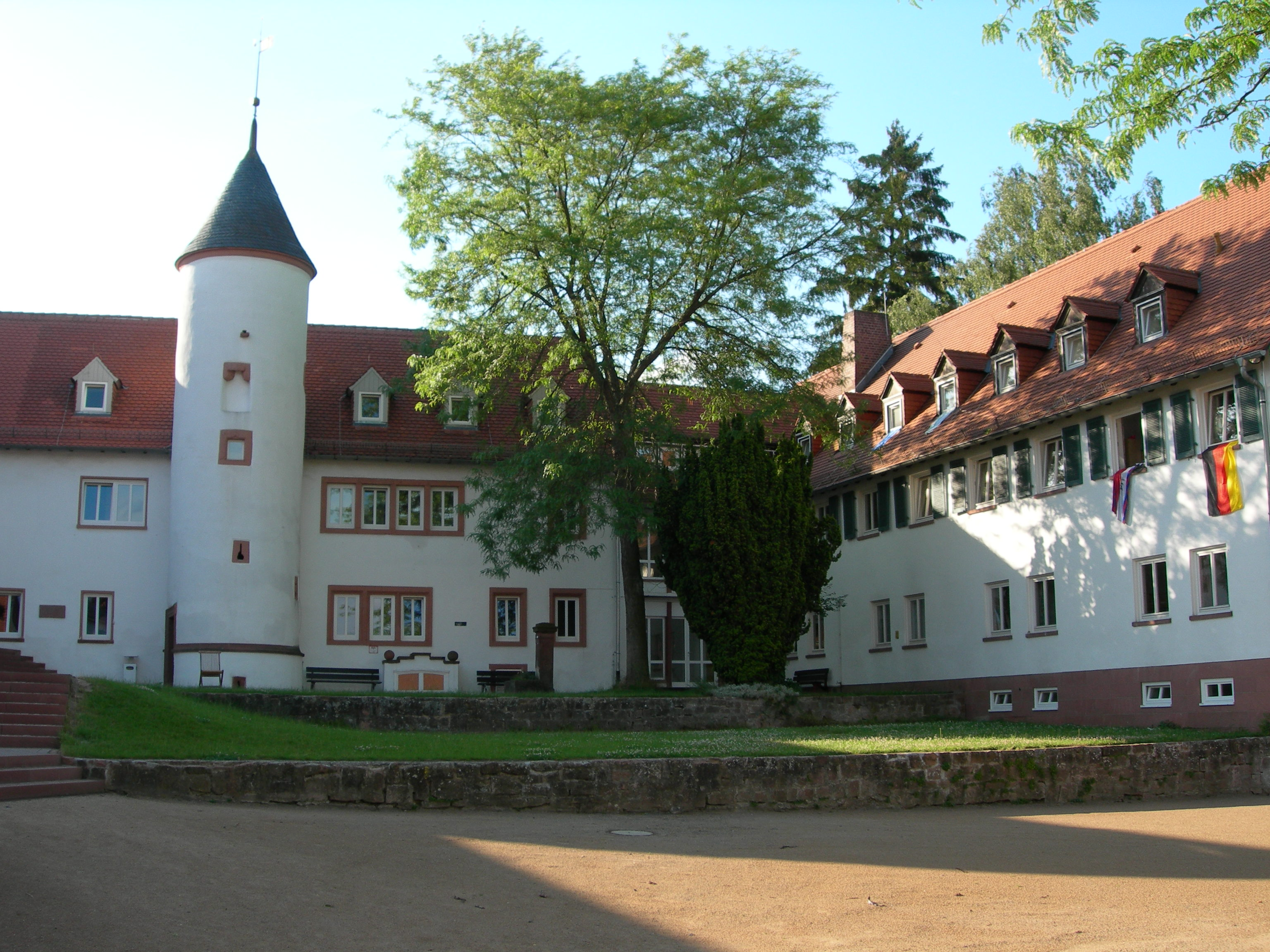
The former monastery is now a seminary centre

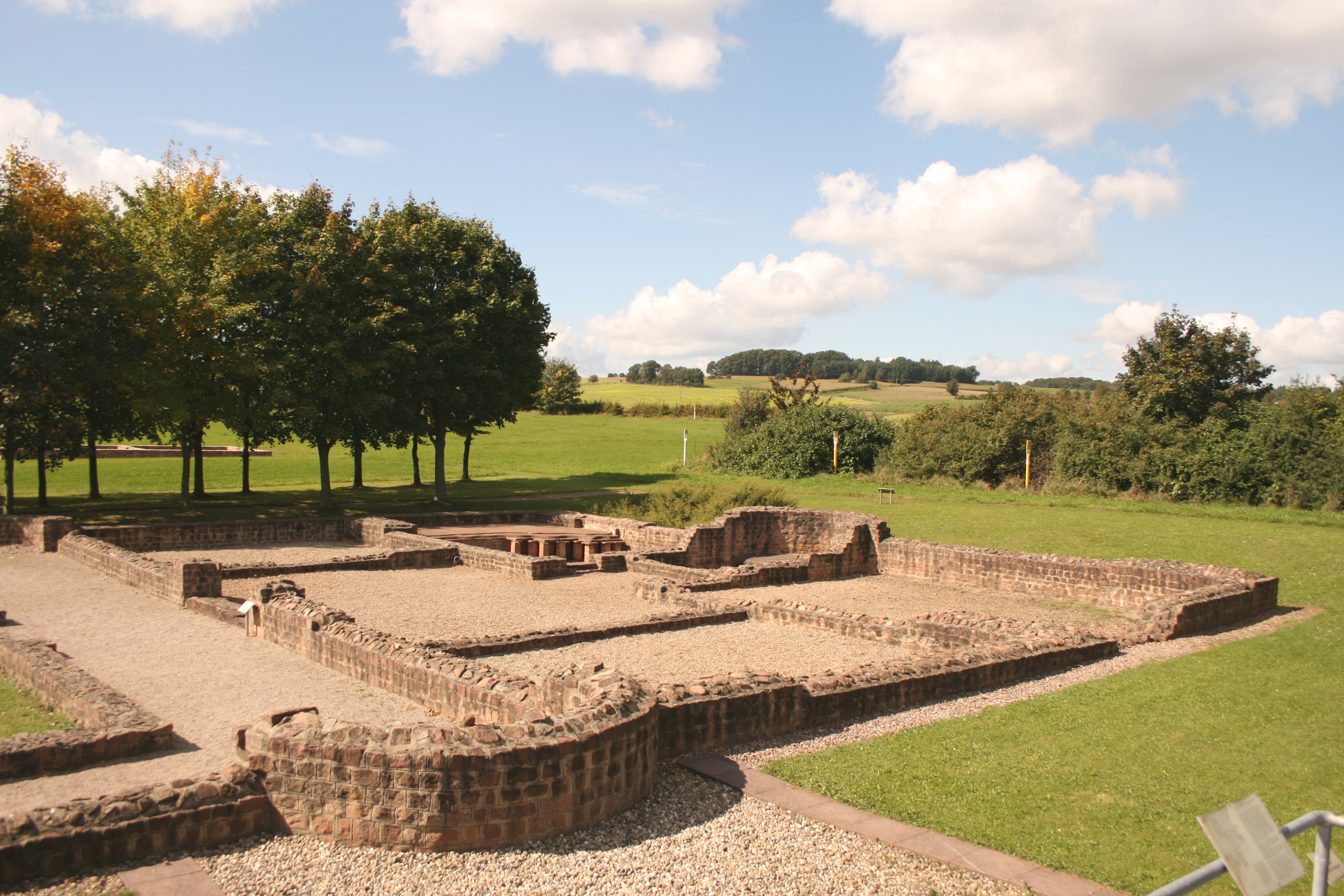
Römische Villa Haselburg – main house's remains

The Höchster Becken ("Höchst Basin"), was permanently settled, as were other favourable locations, no later than the New Stone Age. Many Stone Age remnants as well as finds from Celtic and Roman times bear witness to this. In the outlying centre of Hummetroth, a Roman villa rustica from the 2nd century was unearthed and may be visited as an open-air museum. It is known as the Römische Villa Haselburg.

Höchst had its first documentary mention in 1156. Its overlords in the Middle Ages were, among others, the Lords of Breuberg, the Counts of Wertheim, the Lords of Eppstein and the Counts of Erbach. By the time that the Thirty Years' War was over, the community had nearly died out, recovering only very slowly.

Through municipal restructuring in Hesse, the community of Annelsbach, which up to this time had been self-governing, was amalgamated in 1969. Following in 1971 were Forstel, Hummetroth, Pfirschbach, Hassenroth, Mümling-Grumbach, Hetschbach and Dusenbach. Since 1857, the valley of the Obrunnbach has been known as the Obrunnschlucht ("Obrunn Gorge") and has undergone changes due to tourism.

== Politics ==
The municipal election held on 27 March 2011 yielded the following results:

Parties and voter communities		% 2011	Seats; 2011	% 2006	Seats; 2006	% 2001	Seats; 2001
CDU	Christian Democratic Union of Germany	20.5	6	22.6	7	20.6	6
SPD	Social Democratic Party of Germany	30.9	10	32.1	10	31.7	10
GREENS	Bündnis 90/Die Grünen	12.5	4	4.3	1	5.8	2
KAH	Kommunalpolitischer Arbeitskreis Höchst i. Odw.	28.9	9	35.1	11	41.9	13
WfH	Wende für Höchst	7.1	2	6.0	2	–	–
Total		100.0	31	100.0	31	100.0	31
Voter turnout in %		48.5		51.1		59.4	

Elections in March 2016:

- CDU: 7 seats
- SPD: 10 seats
- GRÜNE: 3 seats
- FDP: 1 seats
- KAH: 7 seats
- WfH: 3 seats
- Total: 31 seats

Voter turnout 49,7 %

=== Mayor ===
At the mayoral election on 5 February 2006, Reiner Guth (KAH) was elected mayor with 64.3% of the vote. His opponent Jürgen Hild (SPD) got 35.7%. On 31 August 2011 Rainer Guth retired from his office for health reasons. He died on 11 October 2011. He was succeeded by the non-party member Horst Bitsch in a run-off election on 20 November 2011, who took office on 2 January 2012. He was re-elected in 2017.

=== Town partnerships ===
The community of Höchst im Odenwald maintains partnership arrangements with the following places:
Montmélian, Savoie, France since 1966
Bělotín, Olomouc Region, Czech Republic

== Economy and infrastructure ==
=== Transport ===
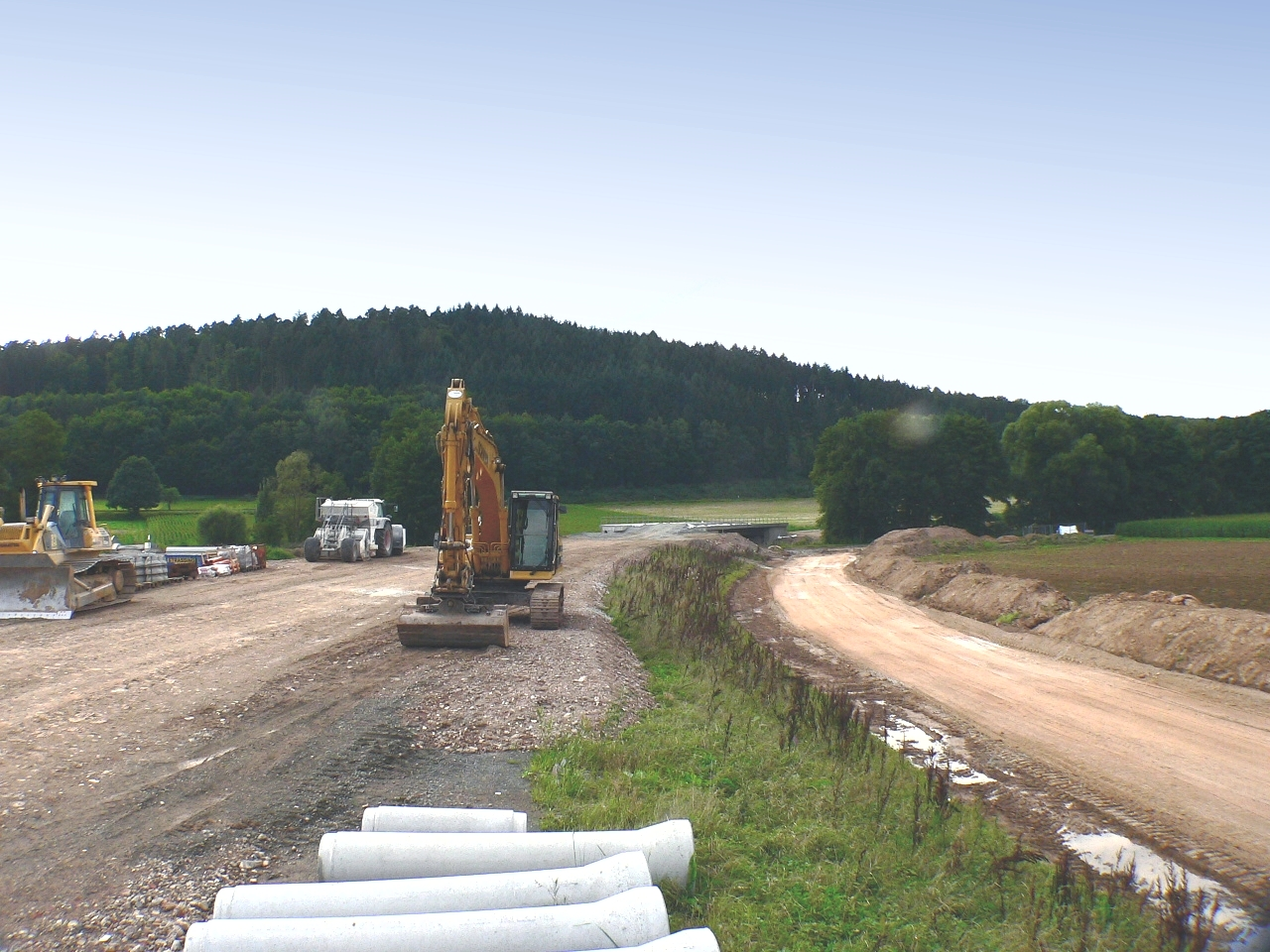
B 45 undergoing work in August 2007

Höchst, like Hetschbach and Mümling-Grumbach, is connected by the Odenwald Railway (Odenwaldbahn; RMV Line 65) towards the north with Hanau and, through a change of trains, to Frankfurt am Main, towards the northwest directly with Darmstadt and towards the south with Erbach and Eberbach in the Neckar valley.

Owing to the rising traffic volume on Bundesstraße 45, which runs north-south through the middle of Höchst, a bypass has been built to the west of the community to reduce through traffic on the roadway through downtown, which along some stretches is rather narrow. The first spadeful of earth was turned on 27 July 2005. The 2.8 km-long bypass has finally opened in December 2009. The building cost has been assessed at €22,800,000.

=== Education ===
Since 1964, Höchst has been home to the Ernst-Göbel-Schule, a cooperative comprehensive school with a Gymnasium upper level.

== Regular events ==
- Each year in May, the four-day Apple Blossom Festival (Apfelblütenfest) takes place. On this occasion, an "Apple Blossom Queen" (Apfelblütenkönigin) is chosen. In 2007, the festival was held for the 56th time.
- Another tradition is the Odenwälder Kartoffelmarkt (potato market).
- Yearly, in November, the theatrical group TEGS stages a première of a play at the community centre.

== Personalities ==
=== Honorary citizen ===
- Franz Polak (1909–2000), Roman Catholic clergyman

=== Sons and daughters of the community ===
- Karl Scherer (1862–1931), Member of the Parliament
- Rose Nabinger (1958), jazz singer, text writer
