= Bad König =

- Town
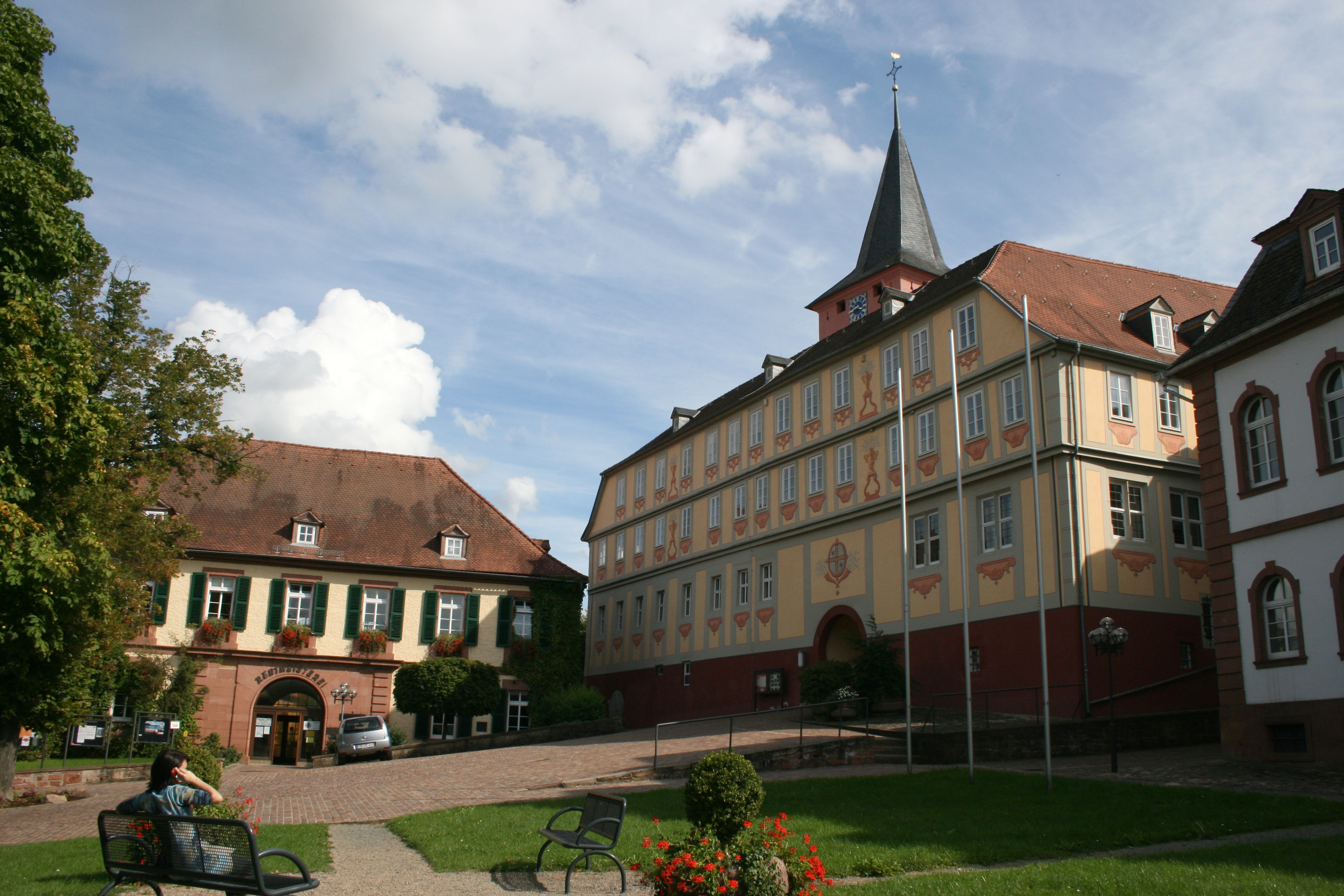
- Altes Schloss (Old Castle) in Bad König

- Coat of arms

- Location of Bad König within Odenwaldkreis district
- Interactive map of Bad König
- Location within Germany Location within Hesse
- Coordinates: 49°45′N 09°01′E
- Country: Germany
- State: Hesse
- Admin. region: Darmstadt
- District: Odenwaldkreis

Government
  - Mayor (2018–24): Axel Muhn

Area
  - Total: 46.73 km^{2} (18.04 sq mi)
- Elevation: 100–400 m (330–1,310 ft)

Population (2025-12-31)
  - Total: 9,472
  - Density: 202.7/km^{2} (525.0/sq mi)
- Time zone: UTC+01:00 (CET)
  - Summer (DST): UTC+02:00 (CEST)
- Postal codes: 64732
- Dialling codes: 06063
- Vehicle registration: ERB
- Website: www.badkoenig.de

Bad König (German: [baːt ˈkøːnɪç]) is a town and resort (Kurort) in the central Odenwald in the Odenwaldkreis (district) in Hesse, Germany, 29 km southeast of Darmstadt.

== Geography ==
=== Neighbouring communities ===
Bad König borders in the north on the communities of Höchst and Lützelbach, in the east and south on the town of Michelstadt and in the west on the communities of Brombachtal and Brensbach.

=== Constituent communities ===
Besides the main town, also called Bad König, the town has the outlying Ortsteile of Zell, Momart, Etzen-Gesäß, Fürstengrund, Kimbach, Nieder-Kinzig and Ober-Kinzig with Gumpersberg.

== History ==
Bad König is one of the oldest settlements in the Mümling valley. There were Germanic settlers quite early on. In Roman times, the name for this place was apparently Quintiacum, and Quinticha was the name under which Bad König had its first documentary mention between 820 and 822. In the Middle Ages it was originally an Imperial holding, then belonging to the Fulda Monastery. Bad König was already fortified in the Early Middle Ages, and was the hub of a tithing area with a tithing office. In 1477, Künnig als Chur Maintzisch Lehn (or in standard modern German König als Kurmainzisches Lehen – "König as an Electorate of Mainz fief") was given to the Schenk Konrad von Erbach. Under the terms of the Erbach land partition in 1747, the Amt of König passed into the ownership of the Counts of Erbach-Schönberg. In 1948, König was granted the right to call itself staatlich anerkanntes Bad, or "state-recognized resort", and in 1980 this resort in the Odenwald was granted town rights.

=== Jewish community ===
In (Bad) König there was a Jewish community until 1939. Its establishment went back to the 18th century. The town's Jewish population peaked at 100 about 1880. It was an Orthodox community. The Jewish families in town owned livestock and horse businesses, cereal and flour businesses, manufacturing businesses and colonial goods businesses as well as those that made glass and porcelain. The firm J. Mannheimer had a great shop for farming machinery. For Jewish resort guests there was a kosher guesthouse. The synagogue built in 1795–1797 was heavily damaged on Kristallnacht (9 November 1938), and in 1939 it was torn down. In 1933 there were still 72 Jews living in town. Because of the scenes of utter brutality in connection with Kristallnacht, most of them left town, especially as from 1939 they were no longer allowed to buy food. At least ten Jews from Bad König were deported to extermination camps and murdered.

== Politics ==
The municipal election held on 6 March 2016 yielded the following results:

- CDU = 6 seats
- SPD = 10 seats
- Greens = 2 seats
- Zukunft Bad König (Future Bad König) = 9 seats

There are local deputies in the outlying centres of Etzen-Gesäß, Fürstengrund, Kimbach, Nieder-Kinzig, Ober-Kinzig and Zell.

=== Town partnerships ===
Argentat, Limousin, France since 1982.

== Economy and infrastructure ==
=== Transport ===
The town is linked to the long-distance road network by Bundesstraße 45 (Hanau–Eberbach). The Odenwaldbahn (railway; RMV Lines 80, 81, 82 and 85) links Bad König, as well as the outlying centre of Zell, with the Neckar valley and also Frankfurt and Darmstadt.

== Personalities ==
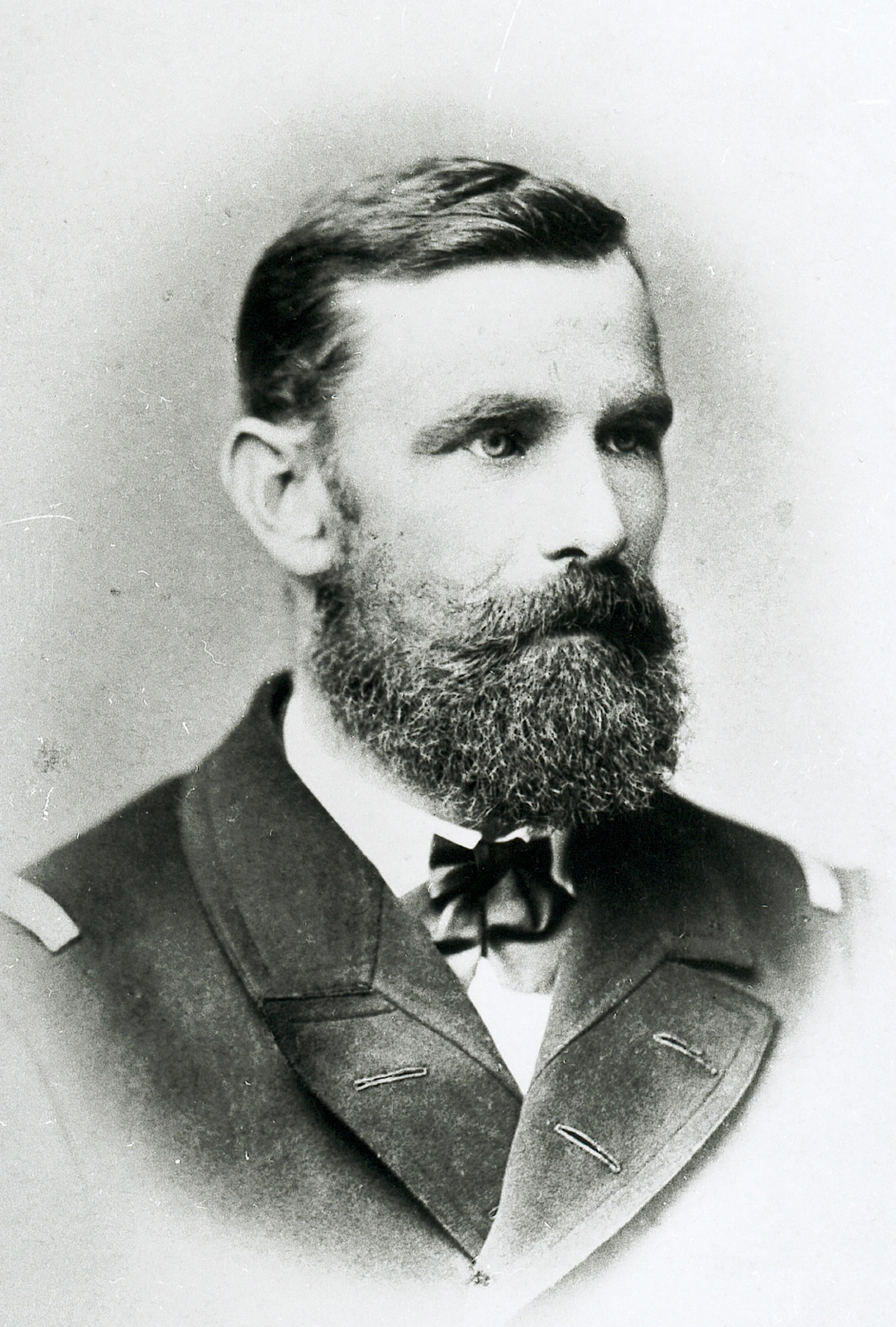
Carl Weyprecht

- Franz Taurinus (1794–1874), mathematician
- Friedrich Bergsträsser (1800–1847), Hessian politician and former liberal-conservative deputy of the 2nd Chamber of the Estates of the Grand Duchy of Hesse
- Johann Adam Groh (1824–1881), co-founder of the agricultural cooperative associations in Hessen
- Carl Weyprecht (1838–1881), polar explorer
- Gottfried Büchner (1851–1919), mayor of Bad König and liberal member of Hesse Landtag
- Georg Vetter (1891–1969), painter
- Ingetraut Dahlberg (1927–2017), information scientist
- Frank Philipp Schlößmann (born 1963), scenic and costume designer focused on operas
- Rebecca Horn
