= Lützelbach =

- Municipality
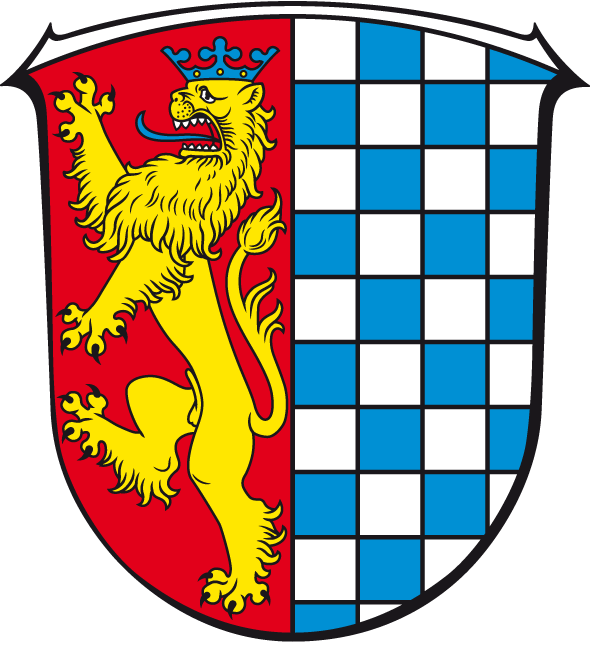
- Coat of arms

- Location of Lützelbach within Odenwaldkreis district
- Interactive map of Lützelbach
- Location within Germany Location within Hesse
- Coordinates: 49°47′18″N 9°4′31″E
- Country: Germany
- State: Hesse
- Admin. region: Darmstadt
- District: Odenwaldkreis

Government
  - Mayor (2023–29): Tassilo Schindler

Area
  - Total: 35.46 km^{2} (13.69 sq mi)
- Elevation: 278 m (912 ft)

Population (2025-12-31)
  - Total: 6,727
  - Density: 189.7/km^{2} (491.3/sq mi)
- Time zone: UTC+01:00 (CET)
  - Summer (DST): UTC+02:00 (CEST)
- Postal codes: 64750
- Dialling codes: 06165, 09372, 06066
- Vehicle registration: ERB
- Website: www.luetzelbach.de

Lützelbach (German pronunciation: [lʏtsəlˌbax]ˈ) is a municipality in the Odenwaldkreis (district) in Hesse, Germany.

== Geography ==
=== Location ===
The municipality lies in the northern Odenwald on the Hesse-Bavaria boundary in a richly wooded setting.

=== Neighbouring communities ===
Lützelbach borders in the north on the town of Breuberg and the town of Obernburg, in the east on the towns of Wörth am Main and Klingenberg (all three in Miltenberg district in Bavaria), in the south on the towns of Michelstadt and Bad König and in the west on the community of Höchst.

=== Constituent communities ===
Lützelbach’s Ortsteile are Lützel-Wiebelsbach (the municipality's administrative seat), Seckmauern, Haingrund, Breitenbrunn and Rimhorn.

Breitenbrunn, which has 830 inhabitants today, had its first documentary mention in 1273, but is believed to have already arisen by the 11th century.

== Politics ==
The municipal election held in 2001, 2006, 2011 and 2016 yielded the following results:

Parties and voter communities		% 2016	Seats; 2016	% 2011	Seats; 2011	% 2006	Seats; 2006	% 2001	Seats; 2001
CDU	Christian Democratic Union of Germany	23.4	7	23.5	7	24.1	7	25.9	8
SPD	Social Democratic Party of Germany	38.6	12	40.3	13	40.8	13	30.7	10
ÜWG	Überparteiliche Wählergemeinschaft Lützelbach	37.9	12	36.2	11	35.1	11	38.8	12
BfL	Bürger für Lützelbach	–	–	–	–	–	–	4.6	1
Total		100.0	31	100.0	31	100.0	31	100.0	31
Voter turnout in %		46.7		51.7		47.8		57.6	

=== Mayor ===
- 2005–2023: Uwe Olt (SPD)
- 2023– : Tassilo Schindler

=== Honorary citizens ===
Spiritual Adviser Joseph Klein, as of 16 November 1987 (born 1913 in Bieber (now Offenbach), died 2005)

== Culture and sightseeing ==
Worth seeing is the course of the Neckar-Odenwald Limes with the watchtower foundations and the castrum remains.
