= Reichelsheim (Odenwald) =

- Municipality
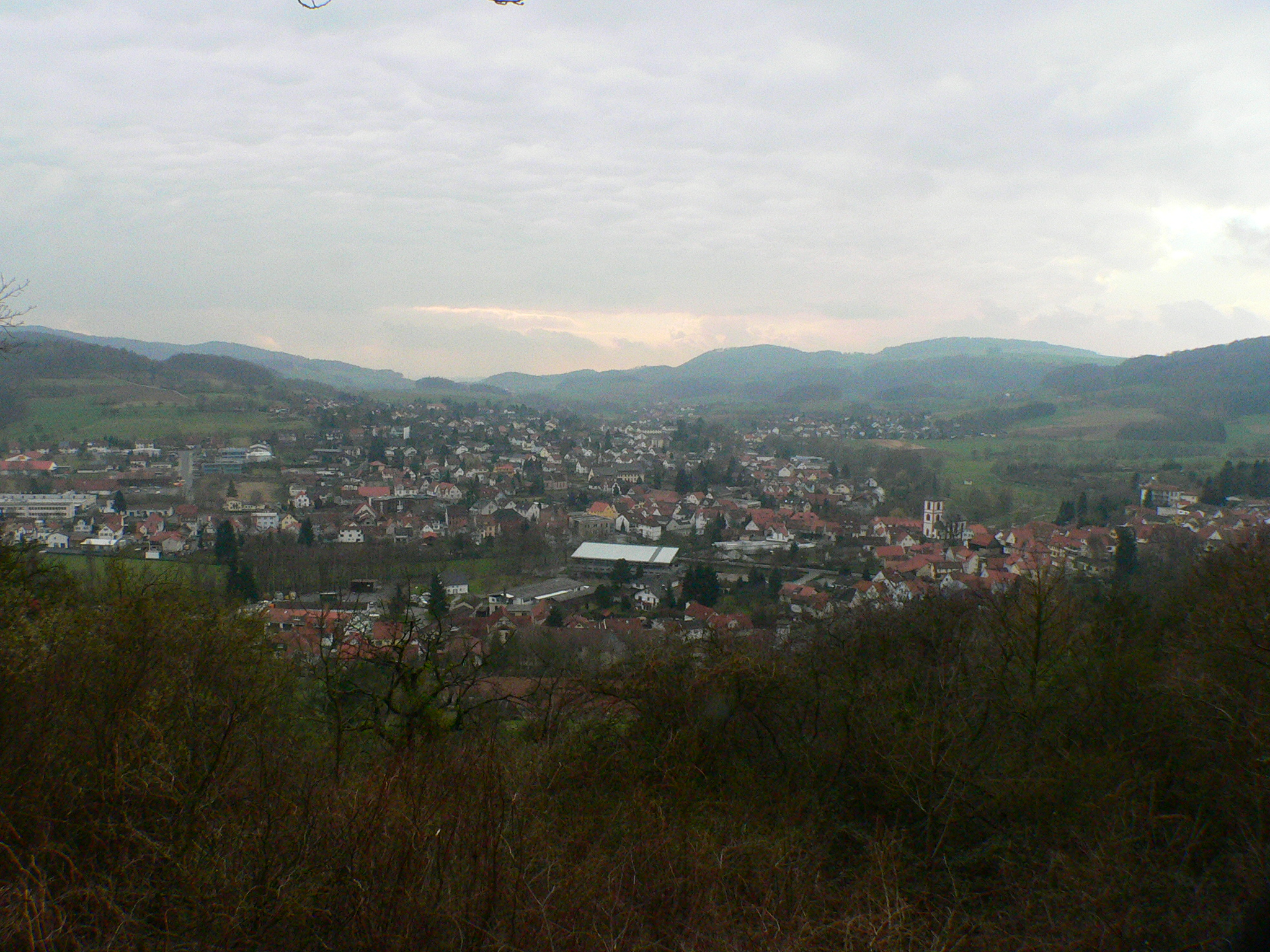
- Town skyline

- Coat of arms

- Location of Reichelsheim within Odenwaldkreis district
- Interactive map of Reichelsheim
- Location within Germany Location within Hesse
- Coordinates: 49°43′N 08°51′E
- Country: Germany
- State: Hesse
- Admin. region: Darmstadt
- District: Odenwaldkreis

Government
  - Mayor (2026–31): Christian Hofmann

Area
  - Total: 58.21 km^{2} (22.48 sq mi)
- Elevation: 211 m (692 ft)

Population (2025-12-31)
  - Total: 8,234
  - Density: 141.5/km^{2} (366.4/sq mi)
- Time zone: UTC+01:00 (CET)
  - Summer (DST): UTC+02:00 (CEST)
- Postal codes: 64381–64385
- Dialling codes: 06164
- Vehicle registration: ERB
- Website: www.reichelsheim.de

Reichelsheim (Odenwald) (German pronunciation: [ˈʁaɪçl̩shaɪm]) is a municipality in the Odenwaldkreis (district) in Hesse, Germany.

== Geography ==
=== Location ===
Reichelsheim lies in the middle Odenwald at elevations between 200 and 538 m in the middle of the Geo-Naturpark Bergstraße-Odenwald.

=== Neighbouring communities ===
Reichelsheim borders in the north on the communities of Fränkisch-Crumbach, Brensbach and Brombachtal, in the east on the town of Michelstadt and the community of Mossautal (all in the Odenwaldkreis), in the south on the community of Fürth and in the west on the town of Lindenfels (both in Bergstraße district).

=== Constituent communities ===
Reichelsheim’s Ortsteile, besides the main one, also called Reichelsheim, are Beerfurth, Bockenrod, Eberbach, Erzbach, Frohnhofen, Gersprenz, Gumpen, Klein-Gumpen, Laudenau, Ober-Kainsbach, Ober-Ostern, Rohrbach and Unter-Ostern.

== History ==
In 1303, Reichelsheim had its first documentary mention.

== Politics ==
The most recent municipal election was held on 15 March 2026, and yielded the following results:

2026 Reichelsheim (Odenwald) municipal election
Party	Votes^{[a]}	%	Seats
CDU—RWG^{[b]}	55,215	50.28	16
SPD	28,787	26.21	8
Greens	14,359	13.07	4
AfD	11,461	10.44	3
Rejected ballots:	108	2.62	

^{a} Local elections in Hesse use a proportional representation system wherein each person is given the same number of votes as there are seats to be filled.

^{b} RWG (Reichelsheimer Wähler-Gemeinschaft or Reichelsheim Voters' Association) is a local party in an alliance with the CDU.

=== Mayors ===
From 1990 to 2008, the community’s mayor was Gerd Lode (SPD). In 2008, Stefan Lopinsky (RWG) was elected with 61.2% of the vote. After his passing in May 2026, Christian Hofmann (Ind.) was elected with 69.64% of the vote on July 19. The results of these most recent elections are as follows:

2026 Reichelsheim (Odenwald) mayoral election (first round)
Party	Candidate	Votes	%
Independent	Christian Hofmann	1,922	47.67
Independent	Thomas Pfeifer	1,063	26.36
CDU—RWG	Oliver von Falkenburg	763	18.92
SPD	Christian Block	284	7.04
Rejected ballots:		20	0.49

2026 Reichelsheim (Odenwald) mayoral election (second round)
Party	Candidate	Votes	%
Independent	Christian Hofmann	2,631	69.64
Independent	Thomas Pfeifer	1,147	30.36
Rejected ballots:		29	0.76
Winner: Christian Hofmann (Ind.)

=== Coat of arms ===
The community’s arms is described with the following blazon: Gules on a mount Or three oaks Or, in between also two oak saplings Or, above them three mullets of six Argent, the sinister and dexter slightly lower.

== Culture and sightseeing ==
=== Fairytale and Saga Days ===
Since 1995, yearly on the last weekend in October, the Reichelsheimer Märchen- und Sagentage are held, during which the Wildweibchenpreis (or “Wild Woman Prize”, this “wild woman” being a character in German legend) is awarded. Many mediaeval sets and costumes are on show to admire.

=== Regional museum ===
This is housed in the former town hall, Germany’s oldest timber-frame town hall with the stud bracing called a Mannform in German. Exhibition highlights are mining, typical handicrafts such as gingerbread baking, Gäulchesmacher (woodcarvers who carve horses), shakemakers and shoemakers along with village school life of yore and the old Reinheim-Reichelsheim railway.

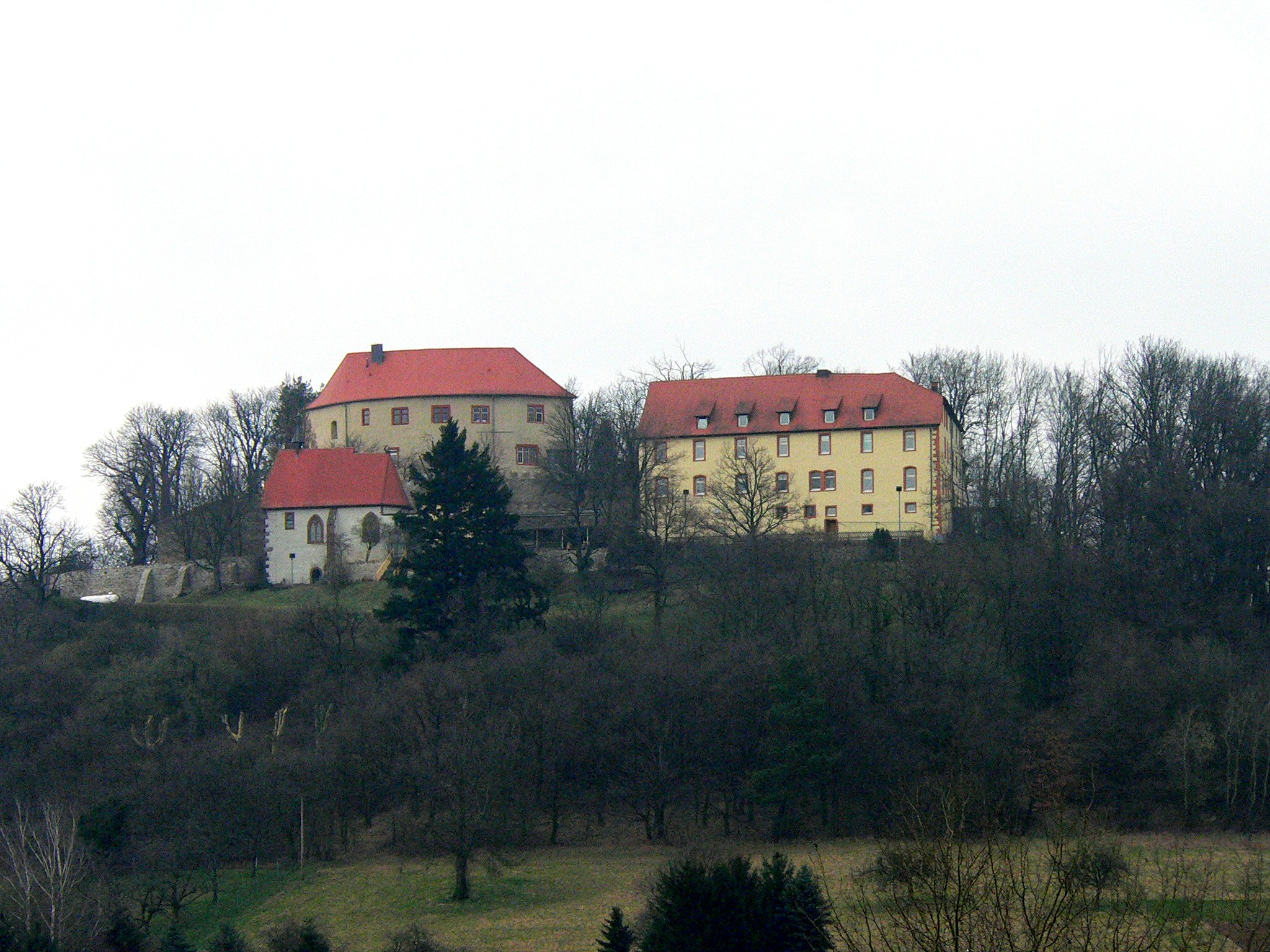
Schloss Reichenberg

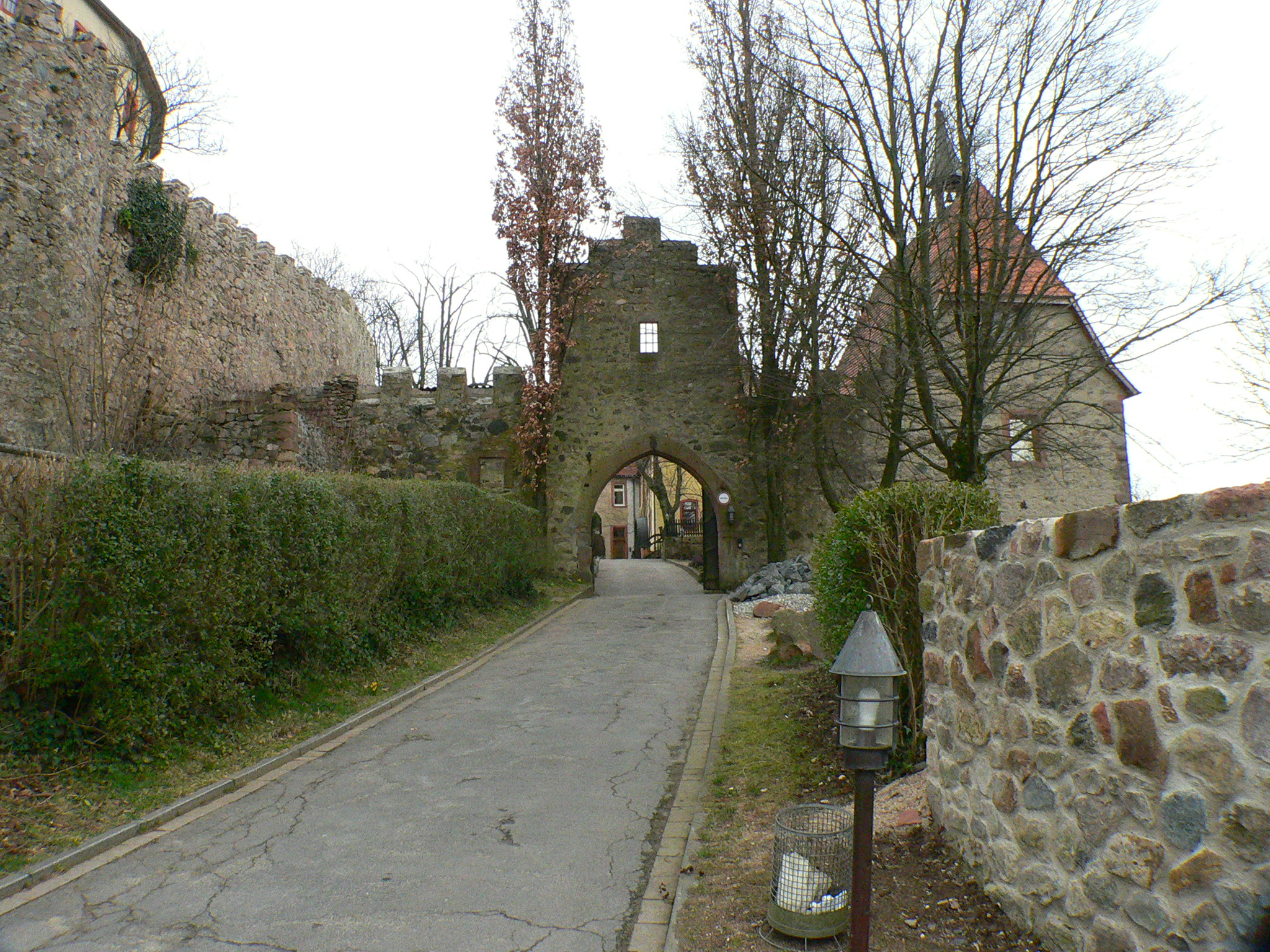
Schloss Reichenberg entrance

=== Schloss Reichenberg ===
Today’s Schloss Reichenberg (palace) came into being as Richenburg Castle in the 13th century, and had its first documentary mention in 1307. Worth noting is the Herrenhaus (“Lord’s house”), or Palas. The Palas was called the Crooked Building (Krummer Bau) for its crooked footprint. The castle was owned by an ancient German House of Erbach.

Here on 14 February 1776, Christian Gottfried Daniel Nees von Esenbeck, who later became a prominent botanist, zoologist and mycologist, was born. He was a friend of Goethe’s, a cofounder of the University of Bonn and the Bonn Botanical Garden, President of the Leopoldina for 40 years and Director of the Botanical Garden in Breslau (now Wrocław in Poland), where he died on 16 March 1858.

Until the mid 19th century, the castle was undergoing continual changes in ownership of various German noble families.

From 1876 to 1924, the castle, now styled Schloss Reichenberg, was used as a private upperclass boys’ school. Thereafter, the Siefert family from the Frohnhof took over the palace. They sold some of the buildings in 1963 as a holiday home to Deutsche Bundespost.

In July 1979, Schloss Reichenberg was bought by the ecumenical community Offensive Junger Christen (OJC, literally “Young Christians’ Offensive”, but known in English as the Reichenberg Fellowship). They converted it into a publicly accessible international meeting and conference centre with a palace café. The upper, older part of the palace, the so-called Crooked Building, is currently being renovated.

== Economy and infrastructure ==
=== Transport ===
By way of Bundesstraßen 47 (Nibelungenstraße between Michelstadt and Worms) and 38 (between Roßdorf bei Darmstadt and Weinheim/Mannheim), which together run through the community, Reichelsheim is linked to the long-distance road network. Bus connections to Bensheim, Fürth im Odenwald, Reinheim and Michelstadt afford a link to the public railway network (Deutsche Bahn and Odenwaldbahn).

== Sons and daughters of the community ==
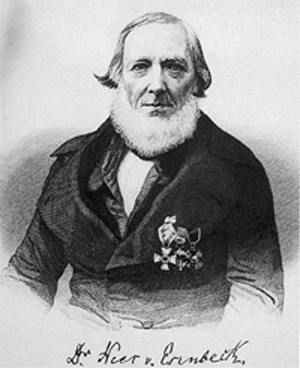
Christian Gottfried Daniel Nees von Esenbeck (1855)

- Christian Gottfried Daniel Nees von Esenbeck (1776-1858), botanist and natural philosopher
- Carl Geist (1870-1931), German landscape painter
- Seligmann Meyer (1853-1925), Rabbi and community leader in Regensburg, Bavaria
- Claude Howard Haring (1903-1967) American Major League Baseball broadcaster in Philadelphia and Pittsburgh
