= Michelstadt =

- Town
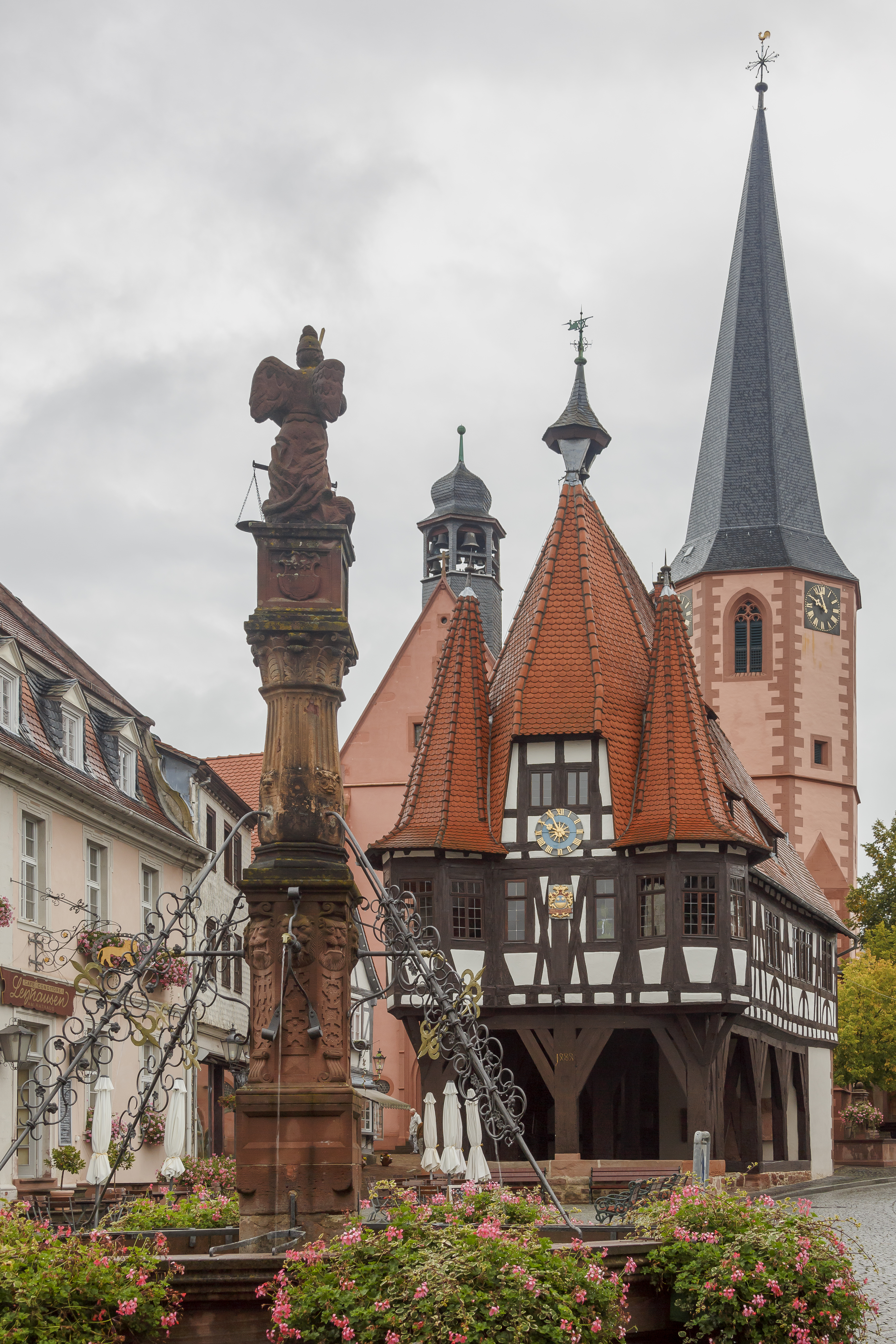
- Market square with town hall and fountain

- Coat of arms

- Location of Michelstadt within Odenwaldkreis district
- Interactive map of Michelstadt
- Location within Germany Location within Hesse
- Coordinates: 49°40′43″N 9°00′14″E
- Country: Germany
- State: Hesse
- Admin. region: Darmstadt
- District: Odenwaldkreis
- Subdivisions: 8 Stadtteile

Government
  - Mayor (2021–27): Tobias Robischon

Area
  - Total: 86.98 km^{2} (33.58 sq mi)
- Elevation: 230 m (750 ft)

Population (2025-12-31)
  - Total: 15,197
  - Density: 174.7/km^{2} (452.5/sq mi)
- Time zone: UTC+01:00 (CET)
  - Summer (DST): UTC+02:00 (CEST)
- Postal codes: 64712–64720
- Dialling codes: 06061 (Vielbrunn: 06066)
- Vehicle registration: ERB
- Website: www.michelstadt.de

Michelstadt (German: [ˈmɪçl̩ˌʃtat]) in the Odenwald is a town in the Odenwaldkreis (district) in southern Hesse, Germany between Darmstadt and Heidelberg. It has a population of 16,244 people.

== Geography ==
=== Location ===
Michelstadt is the biggest town in the Odenwaldkreis and borders on the district seat of Erbach.

=== Neighbouring municipalities ===
Michelstadt borders in the north on the municipality of Brombachtal, the town of Bad König and the municipality of Lützelbach, in the east on the town of Klingenberg, the market municipalities of Laudenbach and Kleinheubach, the town of Miltenberg, the market municipality of Weilbach, the town of Amorbach and the market municipality of Kirchzell (all seven in Miltenberg district in Bavaria), in the south on the town of Erbach, and in the west on the municipalities of Mossautal and Reichelsheim.

=== Constituent communities ===
Michelstadt's Stadtteile, besides the main town, also called Michelstadt, are Rehbach, Steinbach, Steinbuch, Stockheim, Vielbrunn, Weiten-Gesäß and Würzberg.

== History ==
The first documentary mention of Michelstadt is from 741, noted by Carloman, who was Charlemagne's uncle and Mayor of the Palace.

Michelstadt is one of the oldest settlements in the inner Odenwald. Its castle grew out of a Frankish baronial estate. This was built into a refuge for the local inhabitants. As a royal estate, Prince Carloman donated it in 741 to Saint Boniface's pupil Burchard, the first Bishop of Würzburg. This donation was apparently meant for Bishop Burchard personally, for the Michelnstat area passed back to the Frankish Crown upon Burchard's death in 791.

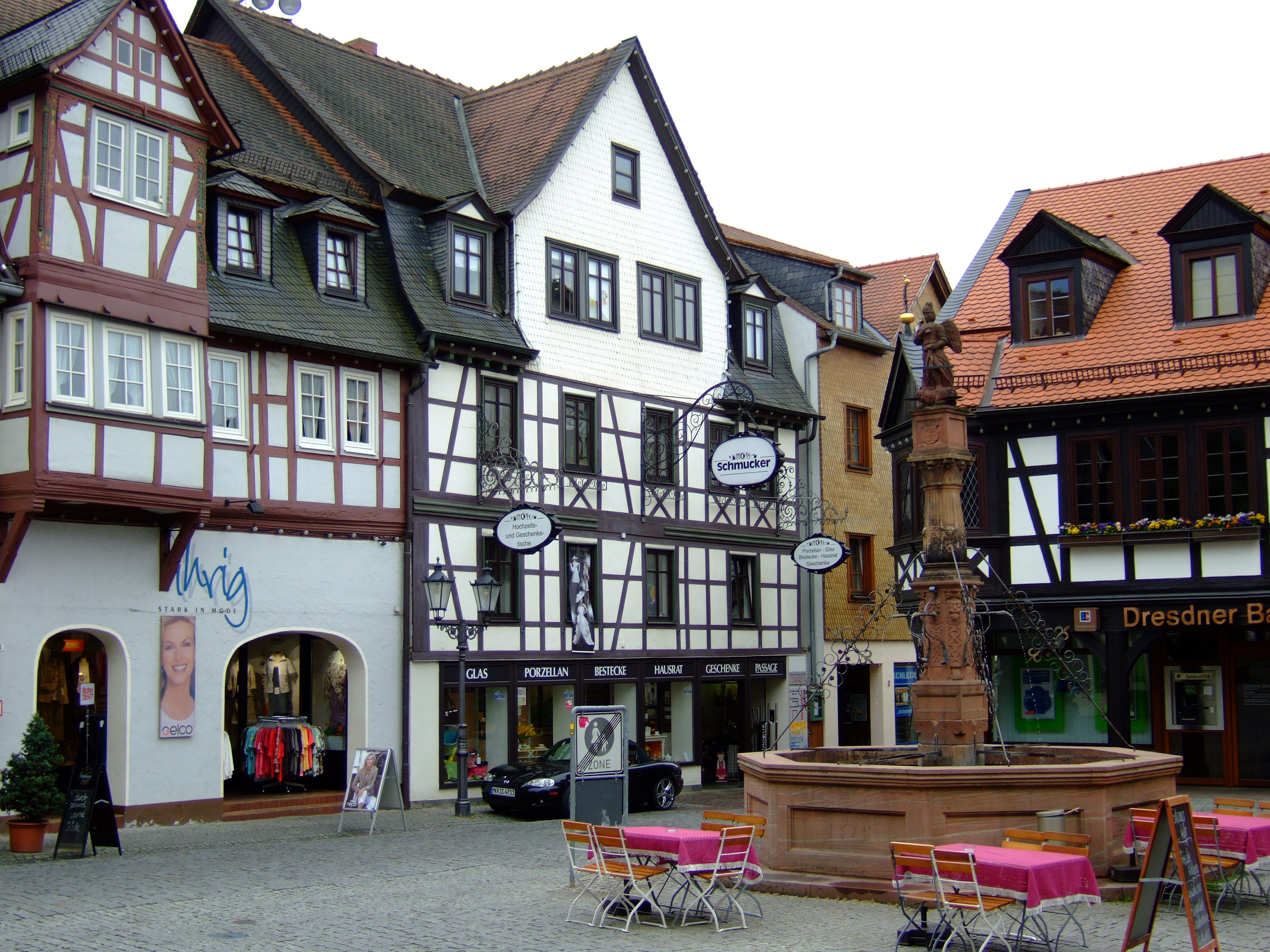
Timber-frame house at the marketplace with the market well

In 815, the Michlinstat area was donated once again. In recognition of his great merit as confidant at Charlemagne's court, Einhard acquired the main town and all land within two leagues (roughly 15 km) from Charlemagne's son, Louis the Pious, as a freehold. Einhard also built the Einhardsbasilika. In 819, he bequeathed his Odenwald holdings to Lorsch Abbey and in so doing precisely defined the boundaries of the Mark Michelstadt. Upon Einhard's death on 14 March 840, the monastery came into its inheritance.

In the 17th century, the first houses outside the town wall were built. In 1773, a new town gate was built, called the Neutor ("New Gate"). In the 19th century, the gate towers were all torn down one after the other.

In 1806, Michelstadt, as within the County of Erbach, passed to the Grand Duchy of Hesse.

The building of the railway line and its completion through to Darmstadt in 1870 and then Eberbach in 1881 brought Michelstadt a sharp economic upswing. Out of what was once a small farming community grew a sizeable town with important industrial operations on the foundation of the centuries-old ironworking. A new economic era began. From the clothweavers' and dyers' guild grew a cloth factory; from foundries grew machine factories. Ivory carving was a starting point for businesses in the souvenir industry and plastics processing.

In 1962, the town hosted the second Hessentag state festival.

In 2007, a decision to merge the town with the neighbouring town of Erbach was thwarted by a civic vote.

== Governance ==
The municipal elections yielded the following results:

Parties and voter communities		Seats; 2006	Seats; 2011	Seats; 2016	Seats; 2021	Seats; 2026
SPD	Social Democratic Party of Germany	14	13	12	11	11
CDU	Christian Democratic Union of Germany	10	8	7	9	9
ÜWG	Überparteiliche Wählergemeinschaft	8	9	11	10	9
GREENS	Bündnis 90/Die Grünen	4	5	4	5	5
FDP	Free Democratic Party	1	1	3	2	3
THE LEFT	Die Linke	—	1	0	0	—
Total		37	37	37	37	37
Voter turnout in %		49.3	49.14	49.7	49.7	56.92

=== Mayor ===
List of elected mayors of Michelstadt:

- 1997–2009: Reinhold Ruhr (ÜWG)
- 2009–2021: Stephan Kelbert (independent)
- 2021–incumbent: Tobias Robischon (ÜWG)

=== Town partnerships ===
- Rumilly, Haute-Savoie, France
- Hulst, Zeelandic Flanders, Netherlands

=== Coat of arms ===
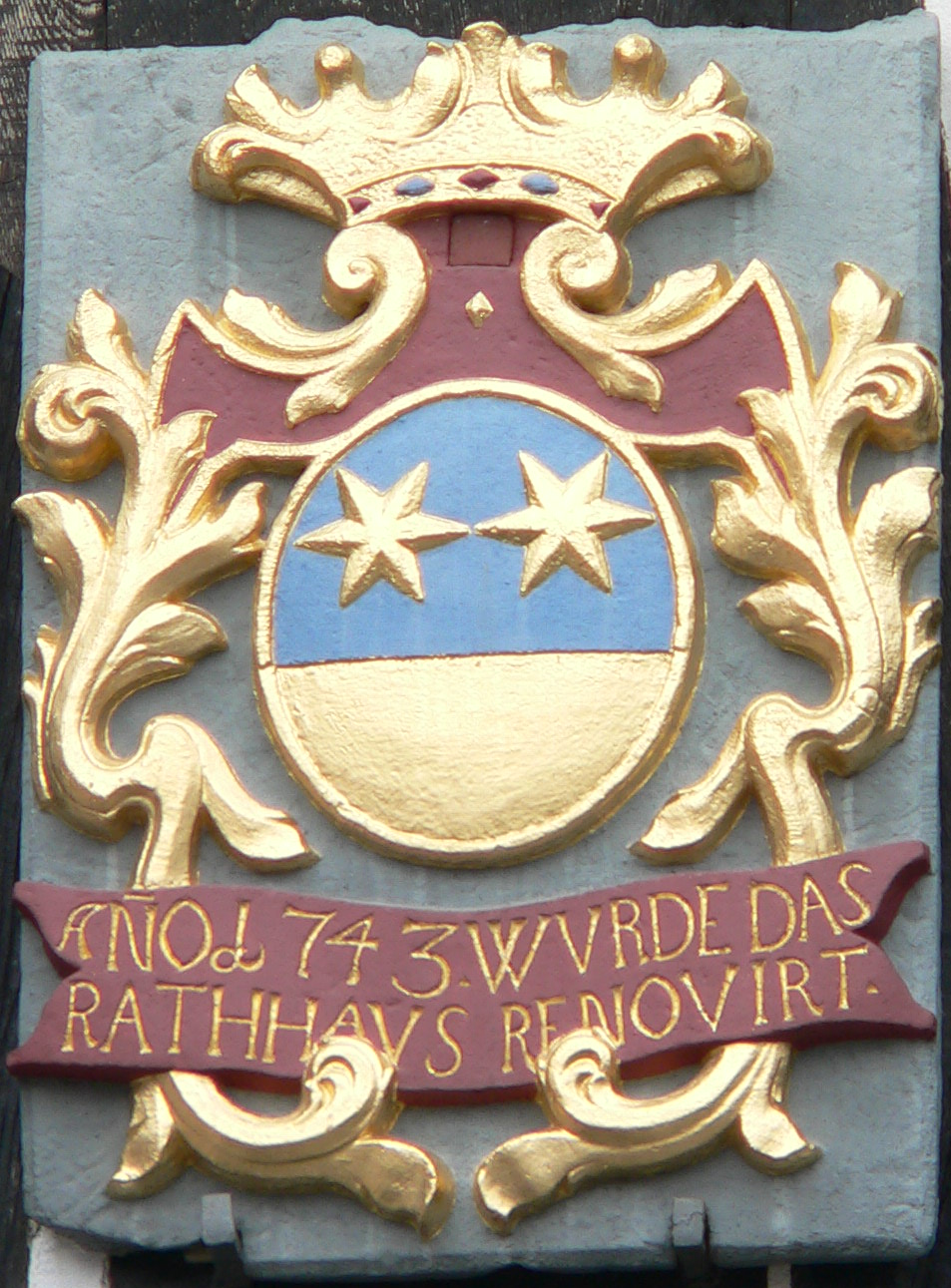
Old coat of arms at the town hall from 1743

The town's arms might be described as per fess azure two mullets.

Michelstadt was granted these arms in 1541 along with its new seal by Count Georg of Erbach. The diapering in the lower half of the escutcheon is unhistoric, and only appeared in the 17th century. Indeed, the escutcheon on the Town Hall, pictured in this article, does not show it. The mullets (six-pointed star shapes) come from the Counts' arms, but why the parting per fess (horizontal division across the middle) was chosen is a mystery. Except for diapering, the arms have not changed since the 16th century.

== Economy ==
=== Notable companies ===
- Mühlhäuser, a manufacturer of railbound and trackless tunnel construction equipment.

== Arts and culture ==
=== Theatre ===
- Kleinkunstbühne Patat (cabaret)
- Michelstädter Theatersommer, yearly open-air plays in the historic Kellereihof
- Theaterkarren e.V. Odenwald, since 1998 regular events with changing groups and producers

=== Museums ===
- Odenwald- und Spielzeug-Museum (Odenwald and toys)
- Museumsmühle Michelstadt – historic mill from 1420
- Landesrabbiner Dr. l. E. Lichtigfeld-Museum (State Rabbi Lichtigfeld)
- Privates Elfenbeinmuseum Ulrich Seidenberg (private ivory museum)
- Motorrad-Museum (motorcycles)

=== Buildings ===
Michelstadt's Old Town features many timber-frame houses. Particularly worthy of mention are the following buildings, some within the old town, others in the surrounding countryside: The historic Town Hall, the Diebsturm ("Thief's Tower") at the town wall, the Kellereihof (a Frankish, early mediaeval castle complex refurbished in an early Renaissance style) in the town wall ring, the late Gothic town church (late 13th century), the Einhards-Basilika, the palace of the Counts at Erbach-Fürstenau (Schloss Fürstenau, within which are parts of an old moated castle in Michelstadt-Steinbach), Jagdschloss Eulbach with an English landscape garden and a Roman bath and castra, formerly part of the Neckar-Odenwald Limes.

==== Historic Town Hall ====
Town Hall

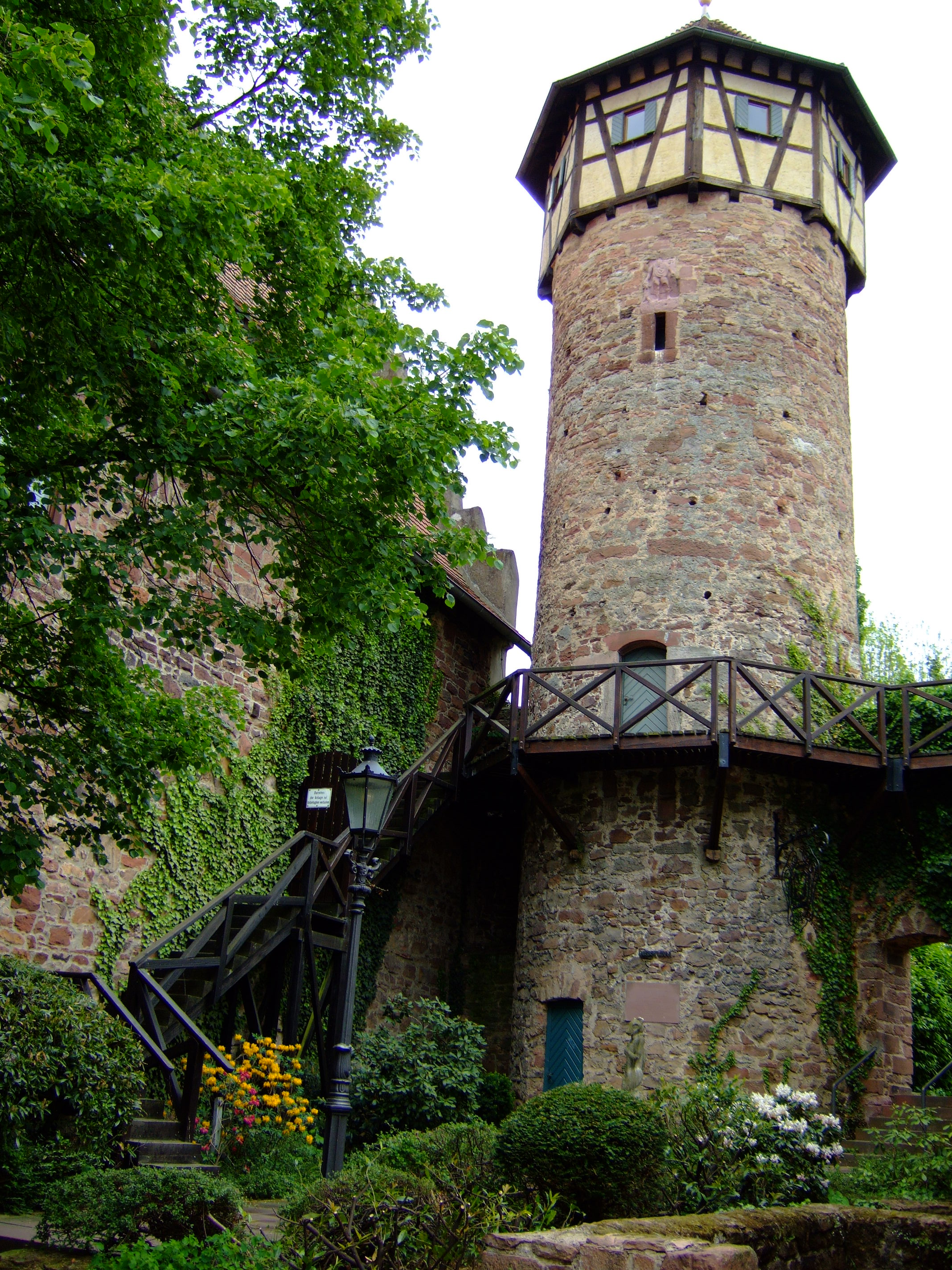
Diebsturm at the town wall

Michelstadt's timber-frame town hall, whose image was used on a Deutsche Post stamp, was built in 1484 in the late Gothic style and later remodelled on the inside many times; from 1743 to 1903 it was covered in shakes. The town hall's main floor served from the beginning as a market hall, and was built using jettying. The back (east) wall was originally part of the graveyard wall, upon which the ground floor's upper bressumer was laid. To this day it is unknown who the master builder was, although it is assumed that the driving force behind the project could have been Schenk Adolar von Erbach and Bishop Johann von Dalberg (his adviser).

==== Late Gothic town church ====
The town church, completed in 1490, was built to replace a Carolingian stone church by Einhard, itself built on the site of a former wooden church. The nave's columns and the two aisles' walls were built in 1475. The quire dates from 1461; the antechoir's north wall is even older – Carolingian. Until the 1970s, the church housed one of the most valuable libraries in Germany in its belltower containing more than a thousand volumes belonging to Michelstadt-born Nicolaus Matz, who was capitular in Speyer, and who bequeathed this collection to his hometown and its citizens in the late 14th century. Since the 1970s the library has been housed in a storehouse specially converted for it at the Michelstadt coaching inn that belonged to the Thurn und Taxis noble family, who played a key rôle in European postal services in the 16th century. The former church on this spot was built over a brook that comes up here, called the Kiliansfloß, an early Celtic-Germanic worship site and later a Roman Mithraic worship site. The thus channelled Kiliansfloß fed not only the baptismal font, but also all the town's fountains. The Kiliansfloß, however, does not actually rise here, but rather far outside the town. It then disappears into the ground not far from the graveyard, springing up again in the middle of town.

==== Einhard's Basilica in the outlying centre of Steinbach ====
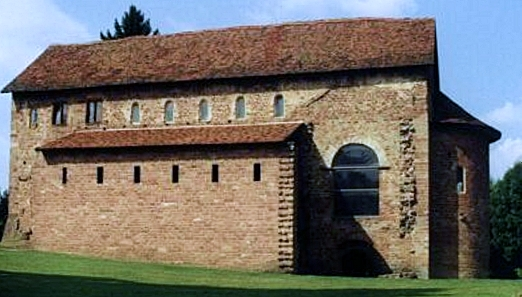
Einhard's Basilica

The Einhards-Basilika was built by Einhard, Charlemagne's chronicler and confidant. The Carolingian church built between 824 and 827 is one of the very few Carolingian buildings that have survived largely intact. The Basilica's crypt once housed Saints Peter's and Marcellinus's relics, which had been stolen from Rome on Einhard's instructions by his notary Ratleik. His servants' nightmares and the remains' "sweating blood" there, however, made Einhard think that this arrangement did not feel right. He thus transferred himself, his wife, the relics and his seat to Ober-Mulinheim am Main, now known as Seligenstadt, which thereby became a pilgrimage site with a new, larger basilica.

The story that has been handed down says that the relics hidden from Rome were transported to Saint-Maurice-en-Valais, now in Switzerland, whence they were then brought to Michelstadt by a cheering pilgrimage procession.

The Basilica in Steinbach was converted, expanded, and rededicated many times and later served first as a hospital and then in the 17th century as a barn. Once it was rediscovered in 1873 as being Carolingian, the exploration and safeguarding of the parts of the basilica that were still intact began.

The Einhards-Basilika was until 1967 owned by the princely Counts of Erbach-Fürstenau. The grounds are now owned by the state of Hesse.

==== The castle of the Counts of Erbach-Fürstenau ====
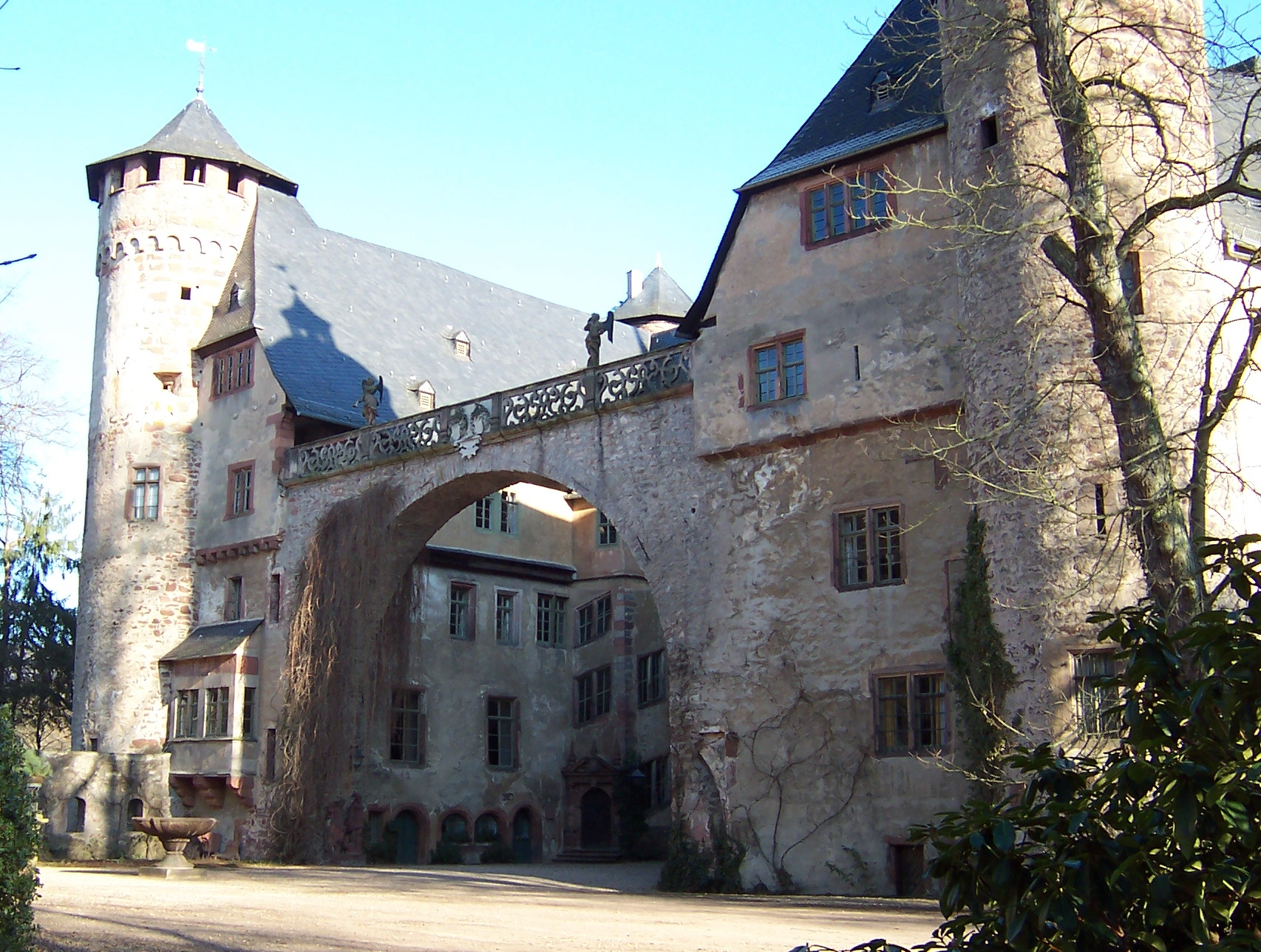
Schloss Fürstenau with decorative gateway arch (1588)

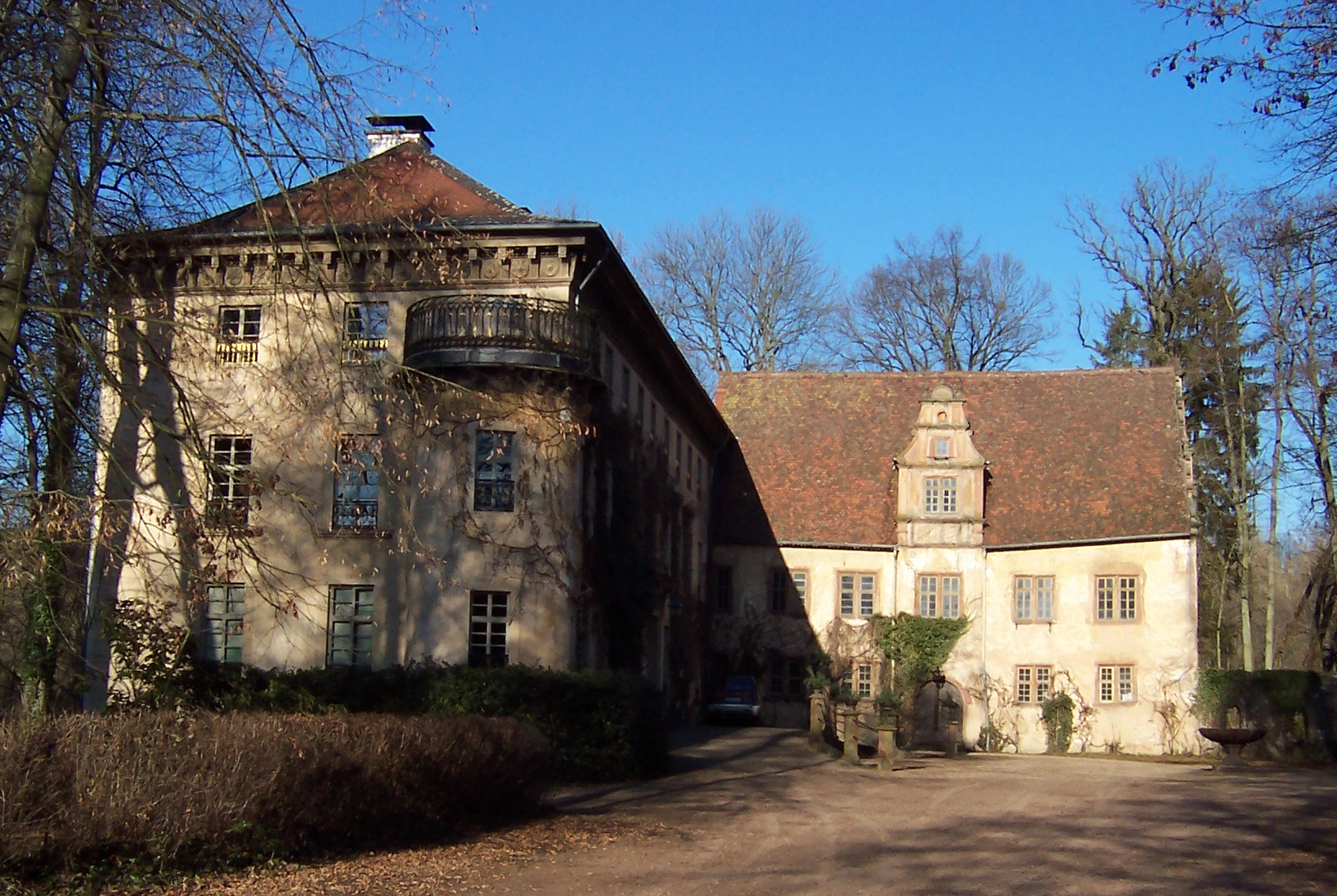
New palace (left), Schloss Fürstenau

The castle in the outlying centre of Steinbach was built by the Electorate of Mainz in the 14th century to protect the neighboring Steinbach Monastery and the surrounding estates against the Electoral Palatinate. The construction on feudal land of the lords of Erbach, who were fiefs of the counts palatine, led to complications that were first resolved with the granting of a fiefdom and later the pledging to Erbach. The castle was first mentioned in 1310. In 1317 Eberhard VI. of Erbach was mentioned as Burgmann to the count palatine. After the castle had initially been granted to Erbach as a Mainz fief, the lords of Erbach acquired Fürstenau in 1355 and finally in 1454.

The County of Erbach became an Imperial state within the Franconian Circle in 1532. Erbach-Breuberg partitioned from Erbach in 1647. In 1717 Erbach was divided into Erbach-Erbach, Erbach-Fürstenau, and Erbach-Schönberg (Schönberg near Bensheim). 1806 the counties were mediatised.

The palace complex is a series of building styles which includes remains of the old Electorate of Mainz border fortifications and moated castle (about 1300) on the north side to the Gothic works by the stonecutters who came from Strasbourg to Steinbach, to the gigantic Renaissance-style gateway arch (1588) between the moated castle's two western corner towers which replaced the castle wall and opened the gloomy, dank courtyard back up to the former castle garden, to the Renaissance palace mill, a former mint (today a run-of-the-river hydroelectric station), to the Baroque Kavaliershaus (a palace outbuilding for staff and guests) on the Mümling, to the Neoclassical residential wing, the Neues Palais (1810/11) and the late Baroque orangery in the palace park, which was built in the English style. The orangery's upper floor housed the small palace theatre.

Schloss Fürstenau is still a dwelling, with the head of the house of the princely Counts of Erbach-Fürstenau and his family still living there. The former Electorate of Mainz defence facility lay on the property of the Schenk of Erbach (a forefather of the noble family, which at that time had not yet branched) and passed into his ownership in 1355. Public access to the ground and is possible by day. At the outer bailey with its gateway arch from 1765 some visual artists have taken up residence (in among other places the former stables from after 1765).

==== Roman bath and castra ====
Right near Würzberg, in the middle of a clearing are found the remains of the Roman Castrum of Würzberg, which was built about AD 100 as part of the Neckar-Odenwald-Limes, and was used for about 60 years before the border was shifted farther east. The castrum can only be made out by an earthen wall. The Roman bathhouse, on the other hand, which stands right next to the castrum, has been partially restored; the floors have been replaced and the wall has been built back up to a height of about a metre. Despite the bath's small size, which was only meant for the fort's 120-man garrison, the design of a Roman bathhouse is easily recognizable.

Not far from the outlying centre of Vielbrunn, in the area around the former hunting palace of the Princes of Löwenstein-Wertheim-Rosenberg, traces of the Castrum of Hainhaus can still be found. Furthermore, on Michelstadt's eastern outskirts can be found the Castrum of Eulbach near the Eulbacher Park, a landscaped English park from the early 19th century with its hunting palace and an adjoining wildlife park.

==== Other structures ====
- Würzberg Transmission Mast
- ESOC-Bodenstation Michelstadt (disused satellite ground receiving station)

=== Regular events ===
- Michelstädter Bienenmarkt ("bee market") – Held each year at Whitsun, it was started by former mayor Hasenzahl in 1954.
- Musiknacht – Each year, various concert productions take place in the Old Town with many different kinds of music.
- Church Consecration Festival with Weinbrunnenfest – From the Old Town's many fountains, wine is given out by the many wine cellars and businesses at the Weinbrunnenfest ("Wine Fountain Festival"), which is actually Michelstadt's traditional folk festival, at which all the town's countless fountains are decorated.
- Michelstadt Christmas Market – this is still quite a new creation of the television-sponsored Stadtmarketing ("town marketing") of the late 1960s. The opening always takes place on the Friday before the onset of Advent.
- Michelstädter Theatersommer – since 2003 a yearly open-air theatrical festival, initiated by the Michelstadt "theatremakers" Alexander Kaffenberger and Dirk Daniel Zucht.

== Infrastructure ==
=== Transport ===
In Michelstadt the two Bundesstraßen 45 and 47 intersect, both are old trade roads from Frankfurt am Main to Augsburg and from Worms to Würzburg respectively.

The town is served by a railway station on the Odenwaldbahn (Eberbach – Erbach – Michelstadt – Darmstadt – Frankfurt / Hanau). Regionalbahn and Regionalexpress trains of the VIAS GmbH stop here.

There is also the special landing facility Flugplatz Michelstadt (airfield), which lies roughly 2 km from the town and is run by a club.

== Education ==
- Stadtschule Michelstadt (primary school)
- Schule am Hollerbusch (primary school)
- Einhardschule (primary school in the outlying centre of Steinbach)
- Grundschule Vielbrunn (primary school)
- Theodor Litt Schule (Realschule and Hauptschule)
- Gymnasium Michelstadt
- Odenwaldkreis Vocational Schools (including, among others, Berufsschule, Berufsfachschule and Berufliches Gymnasium, nowadays known as BSO – Europaschule.

== Notable people ==
- Rolf Beck (born 1945), music conductor
- Dietrich Schenk von Erbach (d. 1459), Archbishop of Mainz (from 1434 to 1459)
- Hartmut Barth-Engelbart (pen names include Carl Hanau and HaBE, b. 1947), author, songwriter and graphic artist
- Rebecca Horn (1944–2024), artist, film director
- Fritz Kredel (b. 8 February 1900 in Michelstadt, d. 11 June 1973 in New York), artist and graphic designer
- Gabriele von Lutzau (b. 1954), sculptor, lives and works in Michelstadt
- Alfred Maul (1870–1942), engineer, considered the father of aerial reconnaissance
- Dirk Mommertz (born 1974), pianist and chamber musician
- Otto Rahn (1904–1939), writer, medievalist, Ariosophist, SS officer
- Stefan Seeger (b. 1962), chemist, university professor and entrepreneur
- Jessica Schwarz (b. 1977), moderator and actress
- Carl Weyprecht (1838–1881), explorer
- Seckel Löb Wormser (b. 1768 in Michelstadt, d. 1847 in Michelstadt), Kabbalist
