= Breuberg =

- Town
- Coat of arms

- Location of Breuberg within Odenwaldkreis district
- Interactive map of Breuberg
- Location within Germany Location within Hesse
- Coordinates: 49°49′2″N 9°2′6″E
- Country: Germany
- State: Hesse
- Admin. region: Darmstadt
- District: Odenwaldkreis

Government
  - Mayor (2021–27): Deirdre Heckler (SPD)

Area
  - Total: 30.76 km^{2} (11.88 sq mi)
- Elevation: 160–332 m (525–1,089 ft)

Population (2025-12-31)
  - Total: 7,222
  - Density: 234.8/km^{2} (608.1/sq mi)
- Time zone: UTC+01:00 (CET)
  - Summer (DST): UTC+02:00 (CEST)
- Postal codes: 64747
- Dialling codes: 06163 (Sandbach), 06165
- Vehicle registration: ERB
- Website: www.breuberg.de

Breuberg (German pronunciation: [ˈbʁɔʏˌbɛʁk]) is a town in the Odenwaldkreis district of Hesse, Germany. It is 28 km east of Darmstadt and 20 km southwest of Aschaffenburg.

== Geography ==
=== Location ===
Breuberg lies in the northern Odenwald.

=== Neighbouring communities ===
Breuberg borders in the north on the town of Groß-Umstadt (Darmstadt-Dieburg) and the community of Mömlingen, in the east on the town of Obernburg am Main (both in Miltenberg district in Bavaria), in the south on the community of Lützelbach and in the west on the community of Höchst.

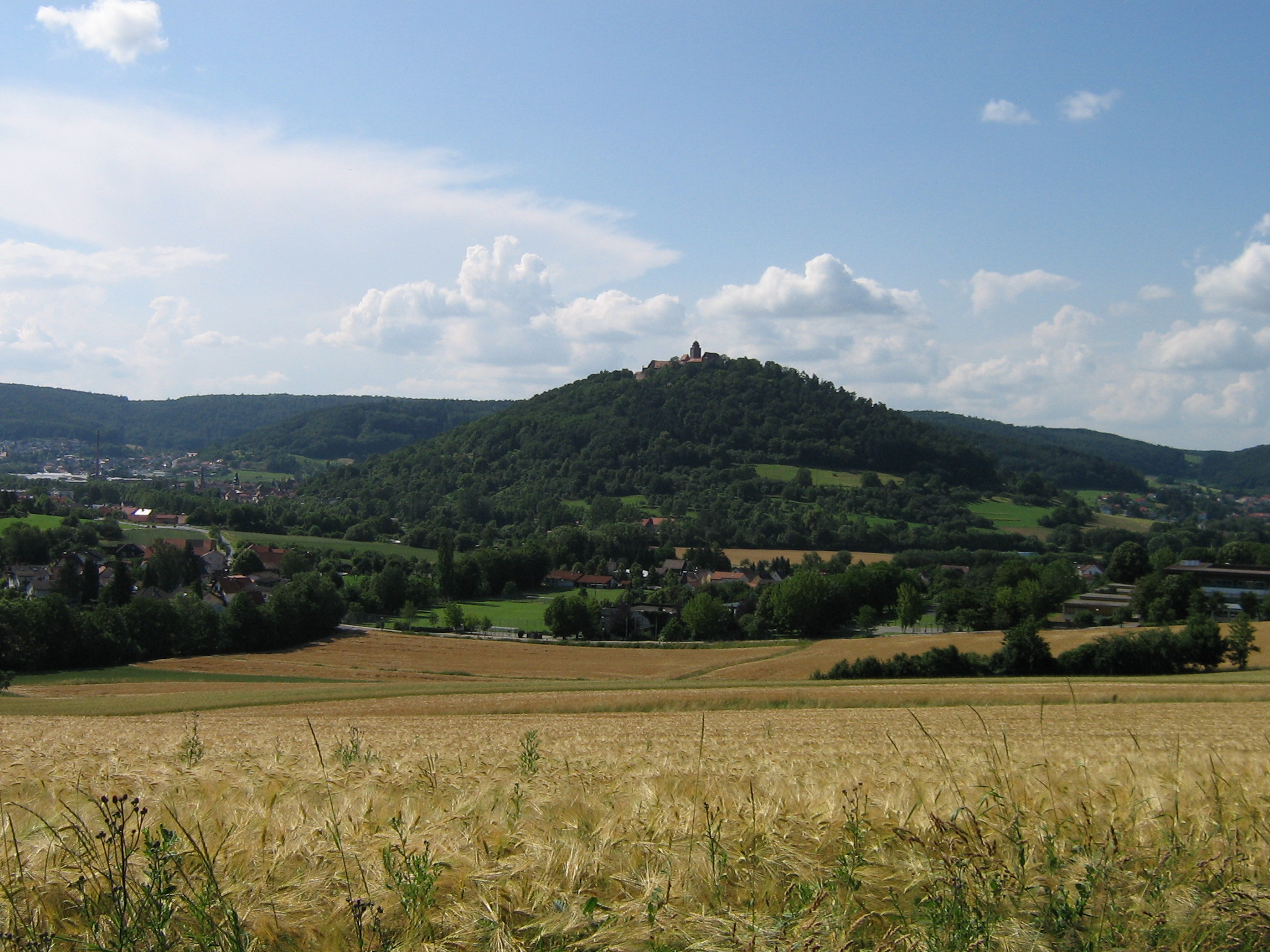
Burg Breuberg in the summer of 2006

=== Constituent communities ===
The town is made up of the centres of Hainstadt (with Rosenbach), Neustadt, Rai-Breitenbach (with Mühlhausen), Sandbach (the town's administrative seat) and Wald-Amorbach.

== Politics ==
The municipal election held on 26 March 2006 yielded the following results:

Parties and voter communities		% 2006	Seats; 2006	% 2001	Seats; 2001
SPD	Social Democratic Party of Germany	67.7	21	63.5	20
BWG	Breuberger Wähler Gemeinschaft	32.3	10	36.5	11
Total		100.0	31	100.0	31
Voter turnout in %		50.0		58.1	

=== Town council ===
The chief councillor (Stadtverordnetenvorsteherin) is Cornelia Fürpahs-Zipp (SPD).

The town council consists of nine members: the mayor and eight town councillors (5 SPD and 3 BWG).

The council has formed four boards and one commission:

- Main and Financial Board (8 members – 5 SPD and 3 BWG)
- Building and Transport Board (8 members – 5 SPD and 3 BWG)
- Environment and Agriculture Board (8 members – 5 SPD and 3 BWG)
- Board for Social Matters and Clubs (8 members – 5 SPD and 3 BWG)
- Culture Commission (put together from factional representatives, town council, citizens and the administration)

At the Bundestag elections in 2005, Breuberg had the strongest showing for the SPD in constituency 188 (Odenwald).

=== Coat of arms ===
The escutcheon is parted by an upright silver sword with a golden grip. On the dexter side (armsbearer's right, viewer's left) in blue is a silver heraldic rose with a golden centre, and on the sinister side (armsbearer's left, viewer's right) in red is a silver six-pointed star.

On 2 July 1975, with permission from the Hessian Minister of the Interior, approval was given for the town of Breuberg in the Odenwaldkreis and the Regierungsbezirk of Darmstadt to bear the above-described arms, which had been borne by the former town of Neustadt before it merged with the communities of Hainstadt, Sandbach and Wald-Amorbach on 1 October 1971.

It can further be said that the sword stands for the market court's jurisdiction or the holding of market rights in the former town of Neustadt. The rose is taken from the arms borne by the House of Wertheim, and the star from those borne by the House of Erbach. Neustadt's arms bore a rose with a red centre.

=== Flag ===
The flag is a red-white-blue tricolour with the town's arms overlaid in the upper half.

== Sightseeing ==
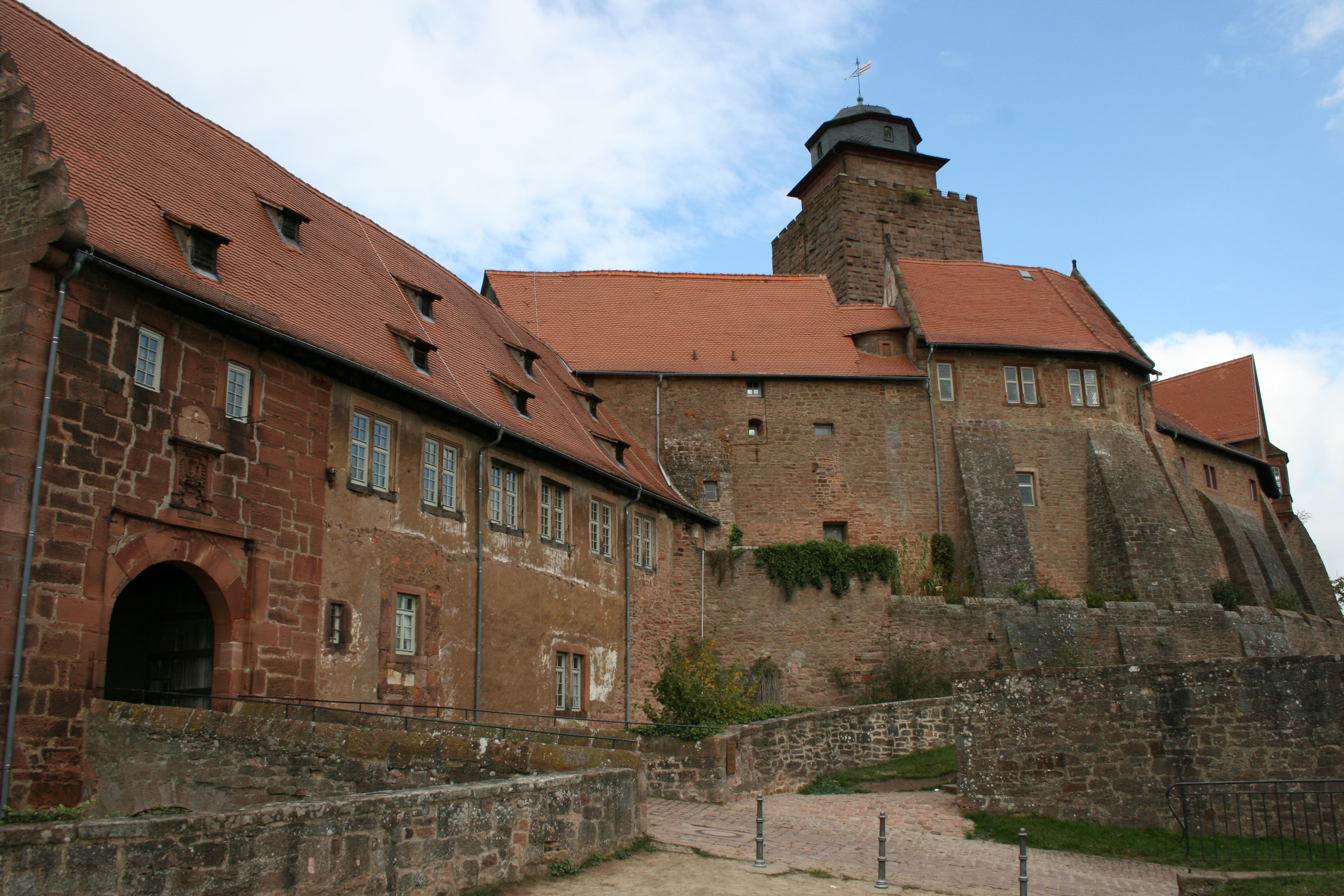
Breuberg castle, keep (Bergfried) and main gate.

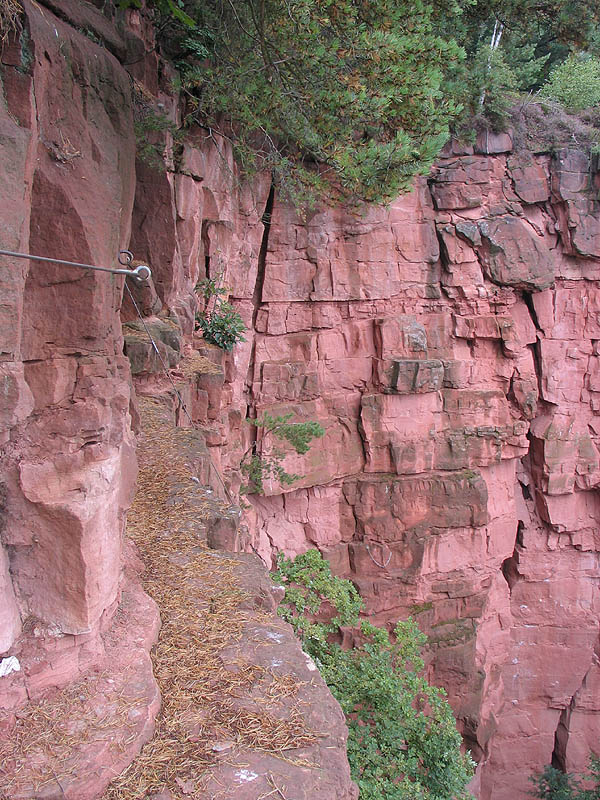
Climbing path in a quarry in Breuberg-Hainstadt

=== Breuberg Castle ===
The Breuberg Castle Burg Breuberg is among Germany's best preserved castles. The so-called Kernburg (“core castle”) arose at the beginning of the 13th century and was founded by the imperial abbey of Fulda in order to protect its Odenwald estates. Around 1200 the bailiwick was taken over by the Lords of Lützelbach, who thereupon called themselves Lords (Herren von) of Breuberg. In 1323 already, the male family line of the house of Breuberg died out with Eberhard III. of Breuberg. From the 14th century, the castle was expanded many times, making it today a journey through the building styles of the last 850 years. In 1446, Count Wilhelm of Wertheim sold Count Philipp the Elder of Katzenelnbogen his share of the castle for 2400 Gulden. The castle may have been damaged but was never destroyed, and was always used, thus explaining its good condition. Today the building belongs to the State of Hesse and serves as a youth hostel and a museum.

=== Quarry with climbing path ===
In the outlying centre of Hainstadt in the Mümling valley is a quarry which has been turned into a climbing facility by the Odenwälder Kletterfreunde (“Odenwald Climbing Friends”). There is also a climbing path secured by wire cables. The Odenwald Climbing Friends take care of the paths. The quarry also lies in the DAV's (Deutsche Alpenverein e. V. – a mountain climbing club) Darmstadt Section feeder area.

== Art ==
=== Sculpture park ===
Sandstone sculptures by sculptors Peter Hörr, Sabine Wagner, Isolde Stapp, Karin Ebert, Marianne Wagner, Paul August Wagner and Heinz Mack can be seen on the Mümling riverside flats.

- STONE AND WOOD (so called even in German) – Each year, sculptors work for one week for the Breuberg sculpture park. The civic foundation arranges for a broad cultural programme.

== Personalities ==
=== Sons and daughters of the city ===
- Klaus Teuber (1952-2023), well-known German game author, among others inventor of Catan

=== Personalities who lived and worked in Breuberg ===
- Oka Nikolov (born 1974), goalkeeper of Eintracht Frankfurt, grew up in Sandbach and began his career at the SG Sandbach
