= Rose Nabinger =

German singer

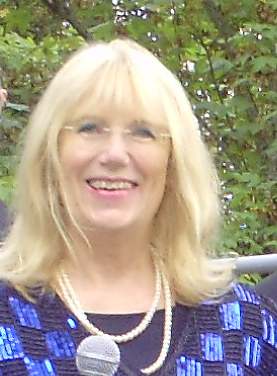
Rose Nabinger 2009

Rose Nabinger (born Rosemarie Nabinger, October 23, 1958) is a German jazz singer.

Rose Nabinger was born in 1958 in Frankfurt am Main, Germany. She married in Marburg and lives there. Her mother, Gudrun Nabinger, was a German teacher, her father worked at AFN Frankfurt. Her father brought home the jazz records of AFN. She began singing regularly with the German jazz band "Kreisjazzwerkerschaft" in Germany and Europe. She recorded several songs with them, including "Miss Jenny's Ball" and "Ich hab' 'ne Schwäche für Dich", a song she co-wrote, that brought her public acclaim.

Nabinger is a famous member of the Union of writers and artists, which is a part of the large German trade union Vereinte Dienstleistungsgewerkschaft Ver.di. She is Member of the Federal Executive Committee of the ver.di service group for music. She was elected "Deputy chair of the Ver.di Federal Commission for the Self-Employed".

She toured Europe with the "Kreisjazzwerkerschaft" and toured Hesse, Germany with Illinois Jacquet and Sweets Edison. She made numerous guest appearances on television shows.
