= Odenwaldkreis =

Coordinates: 49°39′48″N 8°59′38″E

- District
- Flag Coat of arms
- Country: Germany
- State: Hesse
- Adm. region: Darmstadt
- Capital: Erbach

Government
  - District admin.: Frank Matiaske (SPD)

Area
  - Total: 623.96 km^{2} (240.91 sq mi)

Population (31 December 2022)
  - Total: 97,577
  - Density: 160/km^{2} (410/sq mi)
- Time zone: UTC+01:00 (CET)
  - Summer (DST): UTC+02:00 (CEST)
- Vehicle registration: ERB
- Website: www.odenwaldkreis.de

The Odenwaldkreis is a Kreis (district) in the south of Hesse, Germany. Neighboring districts are Darmstadt-Dieburg, Miltenberg, Neckar-Odenwald-Kreis, Rhein-Neckar-Kreis and Kreis Bergstraße. Odenwaldkreis belongs to the Rhine Neckar Area.

== History ==
In 1822 the district was created under the name Erbach, subdivided into two Bezirke Breuberg and Erbach. The last of several modifications of the district was in 1972, when some municipalities from the Dieburg and Bergstraße district were added to the district. In 1972 the district also changed its name.

Dietrich Kühler, in March 2015 Frank Matiaske (SPD) was voted as the successor of Dietrich Kühler and would be the chief from August 2015.

== Geography ==
As the name of the district already suggests it is located in the Odenwald mountains.

== Coat of arms ==
The oak tree of the coat of arms symbolize the forests of the district, which also gave the district its name (Wald = forest). The three stars were taken from the coat of arms of the Counts of Erbach, who once ruled the area.

== Towns and municipalities ==
Clickable map of towns and municipalities in the district

Towns
1. Bad König
2. Breuberg
3. Erbach
4. Michelstadt
5. Oberzent
Municipalities
1. Brensbach
2. Brombachtal
3. Fränkisch-Crumbach
4. Höchst im Odenwald
5. Lützelbach
6. Mossautal
7. Reichelsheim
