= Oberzent =

- Town
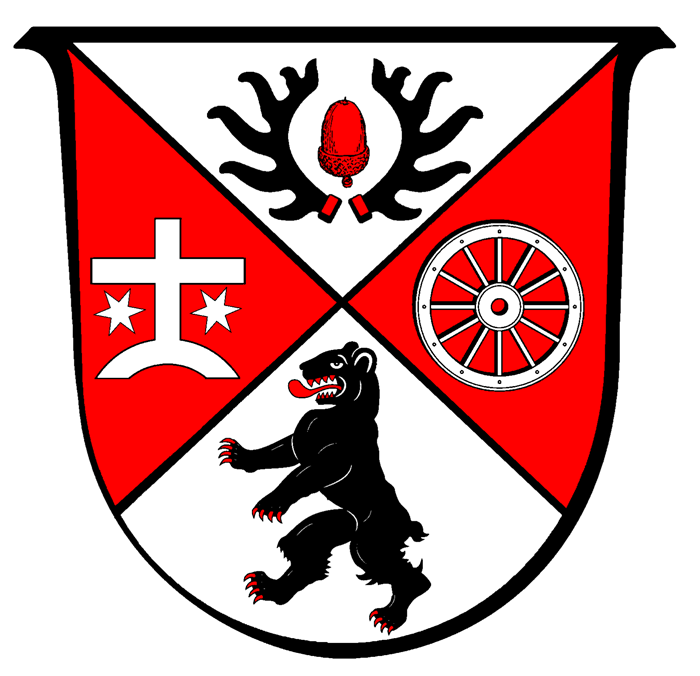
- Coat of arms

- Location of Oberzent within Odenwaldkreis district
- Interactive map of Oberzent
- Location within Germany Location within Hesse
- Coordinates: 49°34′N 8°58′E
- Country: Germany
- State: Hesse
- Admin. region: Darmstadt
- District: Odenwaldkreis
- Subdivisions: 19 quarters

Government
  - Mayor (2024–30): Christian Kehrer

Area
  - Total: 165.61 km^{2} (63.94 sq mi)
- Elevation: 415 m (1,362 ft)

Population (2025-12-31)
  - Total: 9,378
  - Density: 56.63/km^{2} (146.7/sq mi)
- Time zone: UTC+01:00 (CET)
  - Summer (DST): UTC+02:00 (CEST)
- Postal codes: 64760
- Dialling codes: 06068, 06276, 06275
- Vehicle registration: ERB
- Website: www.oberzent.info

Oberzent (German pronunciation: [ˈoːbɐtsɛnt], lit. 'Upper Zent') is a town in the district of Odenwaldkreis, in Hesse, Germany. It was created with effect from 1 January 2018 by the merger of the former town Beerfelden and the former municipalities of Hesseneck, Rothenberg and Sensbachtal.

== Geography ==
=== Neighbouring communities ===
Oberzent borders in the north on the municipality of Mossautal, the town of Erbach and the municipality of Kirchzell (Miltenberg district in Bavaria), in the east on the municipality of Mudau (Neckar-Odenwald-Kreis in Baden-Württemberg), in the south on the towns of Eberbach (Rhein-Neckar-Kreis in Baden-Württemberg) and Hirschhorn (Neckar) (Kreis Bergstraße) and in the west on the municipality of Wald-Michelbach (Kreis Bergstraße).

=== Constituent communities ===
Oberzent’s 19 quarters are Airlenbach, Beerfelden, Etzean, Falken-Gesäß, Finkenbach, Gammelsbach, Hebstahl, Hesselbach, Hetzbach, Hinterbach, Kailbach, Kortelshütte, Ober-Hainbrunn, Ober-Sensbach, Olfen, Raubach, Rothenberg, Schöllenbach, Unter-Sensbach.
