= Sensbachtal =

- Stadtteil of Oberzent
- Flag Coat of arms
- Interactive map of Sensbachtal
- Location within Germany Location within Hesse
- Coordinates: 49°33′N 09°01′E
- Country: Germany
- State: Hesse
- Admin. region: Darmstadt
- District: Odenwaldkreis
- Town: Oberzent

Area
  - Total: 33.94 km^{2} (13.10 sq mi)
- Elevation: 468 m (1,535 ft)

Population (2016-12-31)
  - Total: 951
  - Density: 28.0/km^{2} (72.6/sq mi)
- Time zone: UTC+01:00 (CET)
  - Summer (DST): UTC+02:00 (CEST)
- Postal codes: 64759
- Dialling codes: 06068
- Vehicle registration: ERB
- Website: www.sensbachtal.de

Sensbachtal (German pronunciation: [ˈzɛnsbaxˌtaːl], lit. 'Sensbach Valley') is a village and a former municipality in the Odenwaldkreis (district) in Hesse, Germany. Since January 2018, it is part of the new town Oberzent.

== Geography ==
=== Location ===
Sensbachtal lies in the southern Odenwald and the Geo-Naturpark Bergstraße-Odenwald at elevations of between 300 and 550 m, 10 km away from Eberbach on the Neckar.

=== Neighbouring communities ===
Sensbachtal borders in the east on the community of Hesseneck (Odenwaldkreis), in the south on the town of Eberbach (Rhein-Neckar-Kreis in Baden-Württemberg) and in the west and north on the town of Beerfelden (Odenwaldkreis).

=== Constituent communities ===
Sensbachtal’s Ortsteile are Hebstahl, Ober-Sensbach and Unter-Sensbach.

== Politics ==
The municipal election held on 26 March 2006 yielded the following results:

Parties and voter communities		% 2006	Seats; 2006	% 2001	Seats; 2001
GFW/ÜWS	Gemeinschaft Freier Wähler/Überparteiliche Wählervereinigung Sensbachtal	100.0	15	65.6	10
DS	Dorfgemeinschaft Sensbachtal	–	–	22.8	3
BVS	Bürger-Vereinigung-Sensbachtal	–	–	11.6	2
Total		100.0	15	100.0	15
Voter turnout in %		52.0		72.5	

The municipal council is thereby made up exclusively of non-party voter communities. In Hesse, this is otherwise only the case in the community of Antrifttal (Vogelsbergkreis).

=== Mayor ===
Egon Scheuermann has been the mayor since 1 January 2008.

== Culture and sightseeing ==
=== Buildings ===
The Jagdschloss Krähberg (“hunting palace”) was built about 1780, and is nowadays privately used.

== Economy and infrastructure ==
=== Transport ===
Bundesstraße 45 lies roughly 8 km from the community.
