= Hesseneck =

- Stadtteil of Oberzent
- Flag Coat of arms
- Interactive map of Hesseneck
- Location within Germany Location within Hesse
- Coordinates: 49°34′N 09°04′E
- Country: Germany
- State: Hesse
- Admin. region: Darmstadt
- District: Odenwaldkreis
- Town: Oberzent
- Subdivisions: 3 Ortsteile

Area
  - Total: 29.98 km^{2} (11.58 sq mi)
- Elevation: 420 m (1,380 ft)

Population (2016-12-31)
  - Total: 620
  - Density: 21/km^{2} (54/sq mi)
- Time zone: UTC+01:00 (CET)
  - Summer (DST): UTC+02:00 (CEST)
- Postal codes: 64754
- Dialling codes: 06276
- Vehicle registration: ERB

Hesseneck (German pronunciation: [ˈhɛsn̩ˌʔɛk]) is a village and a former municipality in the Odenwaldkreis (district) in Hesse, Germany. With only just over 600 inhabitants, Hesseneck was Hesse’s smallest self-governing community. Since January 2018, it is part of the new town Oberzent.

== Geography ==
=== Location ===
The community lies in the southern Odenwald at the foot of the Krähberg at elevations of 230 to 500 m. It lies at the three-state common point shared by Hesse, Bavaria and Baden-Württemberg. The community's name itself means "Hesse Corner". The outlying centre of Hesselbach has no road link to Hessian territory and can only be reached through Baden-Württemberg.

=== Neighbouring communities ===
Hesseneck borders in the north on the towns of Beerfelden and Erbach (both in the Odenwaldkreis) as well as the market town of Kirchzell (Miltenberg district in Bavaria), in the east on the community of Mudau (Neckar-Odenwald-Kreis in Baden-Württemberg), in the south on the town of Eberbach (Rhein-Neckar-Kreis in Baden-Württemberg) and in the west on the community of Sensbachtal (Odenwaldkreis).

=== Constituent communities ===
Hesseneck’s Ortsteile are Hesselbach, Kailbach and Schöllenbach (the community’s administrative seat)

== Politics ==
The municipal election held on 6 March 2016 yielded the following results:

- CDU: 3 seats
- SPD: 8 seats

=== Mayor ===
Mayor Thomas Ihrig (SPD) was reelected in the first vote held on 12 June 2005 with 71.7% of the vote, he was also reelected in 2011.

== Culture and sightseeing ==
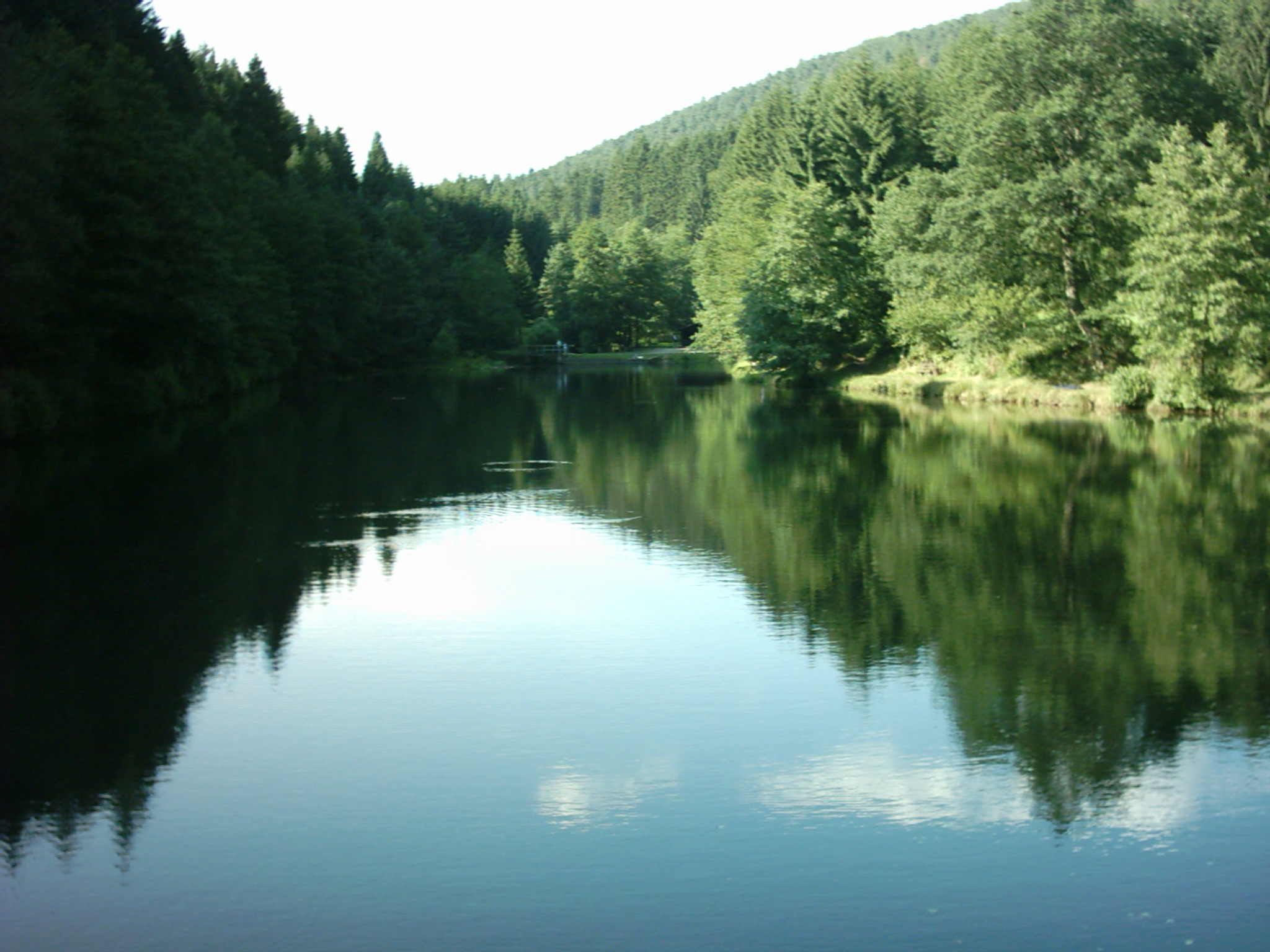
Eutersee

=== Buildings ===
- Worth seeing is the course of the Neckar-Odenwald Limes through the outlying centre of Hesselbach with the like-named castrum and the watchtower foundation as well as the Quellkirche (church) at Schöllenbach (built in 1465).
- Near Kailbach is found the Haintalviadukt on the Odenwaldbahn (railway; RMV Line 65). It has nine arches each with a 15 m span, and is 173 m long and 30 m high.

=== Nature ===
- Eutersee (lake with bathing)

== Economy and infrastructure ==
=== Transport ===
Hesseneck is linked to the long-distance road network by Bundesstraße 45 (Hanau–Eberbach), with Erbach lying 9 km along the road. The Odenwaldbahn serves the community with two halts in Kailbach and Schöllenbach.
