= Beerfelden =

- Stadtteil of Oberzent
- Coat of arms
- Interactive map of Beerfelden
- Location within Germany Location within Hesse
- Coordinates: 49°34′N 8°58′E
- Country: Germany
- State: Hesse
- Admin. region: Darmstadt
- District: Odenwaldkreis
- Town: Oberzent

Area
  - Total: 71.18 km^{2} (27.48 sq mi)
- Elevation: 397 m (1,302 ft)

Population (2016-12-31)
  - Total: 6,405
  - Density: 89.98/km^{2} (233.1/sq mi)
- Time zone: UTC+01:00 (CET)
  - Summer (DST): UTC+02:00 (CEST)
- Postal codes: 64743
- Dialling codes: 06068
- Vehicle registration: ERB
- Website: Official website

Beerfelden (German pronunciation: [beːɐ̯ˈfɛldn̩]) was a town in the Odenwald in the Odenwaldkreis (district) in Hesse, Germany, 28 km northeast of Heidelberg. On 1 January 2018 Beerfelden, Hesseneck, Rothenberg and Sensbachtal merged to create the town Oberzent.

== Geography ==
=== Location ===
Beerfelden lies in the Odenwald at elevations from 330 to 540 m. Towards the south stretches the narrow, wooded Gammelsbach Valley, in which are found the Freienstein castle ruins, down to the Neckar.

The Beerfelder Land is a tourist region that lies between Beerfelden, the communities of Rothenberg, Sensbachtal and Hesseneck in the Geo-Naturpark Bergstraße-Odenwald and which is one of the Odenwald's most richly forested areas. The Beerfelder Land lies at elevations from 200 to 555 m above sea level. Within it is the 626 m-high Katzenbuckel near Waldkatzenbach, which is part of a chain of heights running north-south.

To the east stands the Krähberg hunting castle (Jagdschloss) that once belonged to the Counts of Erbach-Fürstenau, under which runs a railway tunnel, the Krähbergtunnel, which was at the time of its building one of Germany's longest at 3.1 km (elevation: 348 m).

=== Neighbouring communities ===
Beerfelden borders in the north on the community of Mossautal and the town of Erbach, in the east on the communities of Hesseneck and Sensbachtal, in the south on the town of Eberbach (Rhein-Neckar-Kreis in Baden-Württemberg) and the community of Rothenberg and in the west on the community of Wald-Michelbach (Kreis Bergstraße).

=== Constituent communities ===
Beerfelden's Ortsteile are Olfen, Airlenbach, Beerfelden, Etzean, Falken-Gesäß, Gammelsbach and Hetzbach.

== History ==
Beerfelden was enfeoffed to the Lorsch Monastery as early as the 10th century. It had its first documentary mention under the name Burrifelden in 1032 in the Lorsch codex.

In 1328, Beerfelden (whose name was then spelt Baurenfelden) was granted town rights.

In 1806, in the course of the Reichsdeputationshauptschluss, the town passed from the County of Erbach to Hesse.

On 29 April 1810, almost the whole town burnt down. The Grand Duke of Hesse and the Count of Erbach-Fürstenau saw to the relief efforts. The Hessian Brandassekuratorionskasse paid out 172,802 Gulden for reconstruction.

== Politics ==
The municipal election held on 26 March 2006 yielded the following results:

| Parties and voter communities | | % 2006 | Seats; 2006 | % 2001 | Seats; 2001 |
| CDU | Christian Democratic Union of Germany | 16.4 | 4 | 14.3 | 4 |
| SPD | Social Democratic Party of Germany | 51.4 | 13 | 50.5 | 16 |
| GREENS | Bündnis 90/Die Grünen | 5.6 | 1 | 6.1 | 2 |
| ÜWG | Überparteiliche Wählergemeinschaft Beerfelden | 26.6 | 7 | 29.1 | 9 |
| Total | | 100.0 | 25 | 100.0 | 31 |
| Voter turnout in % | | 62.9 | | 64.3 | |

=== Town partnerships ===
(France) Since 1966, the outlying centre of Olfen has been fostering a partnership with the community of Trévignin in the French department of Savoie.

== Public institutions ==
=== Education ===
There are two primary schools in Beerfelden, one in the main town and another in the outlying centre of Gammelsbach. Moreover, the main town is also home to two kindergartens, one municipal and the other Evangelical. There is furthermore a comprehensive school in the main town, named Oberzent-Schule.

== Culture and sightseeing ==
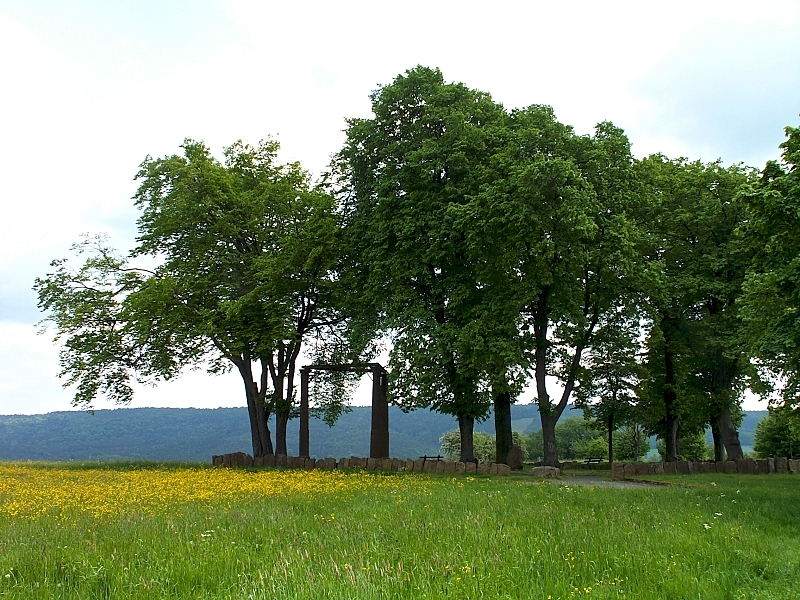
Gallows in Beerfelden

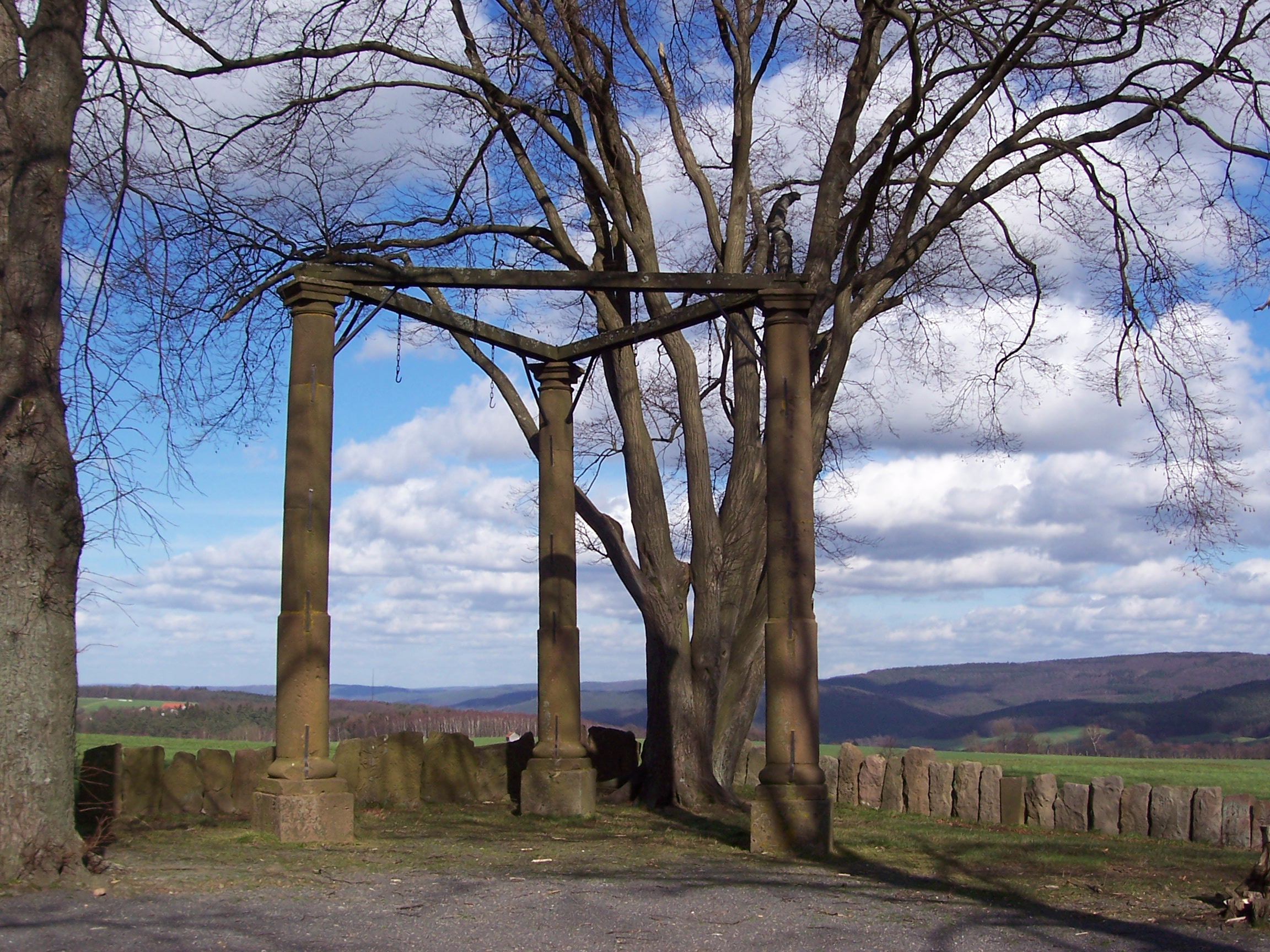
Gallows in Beerfelden

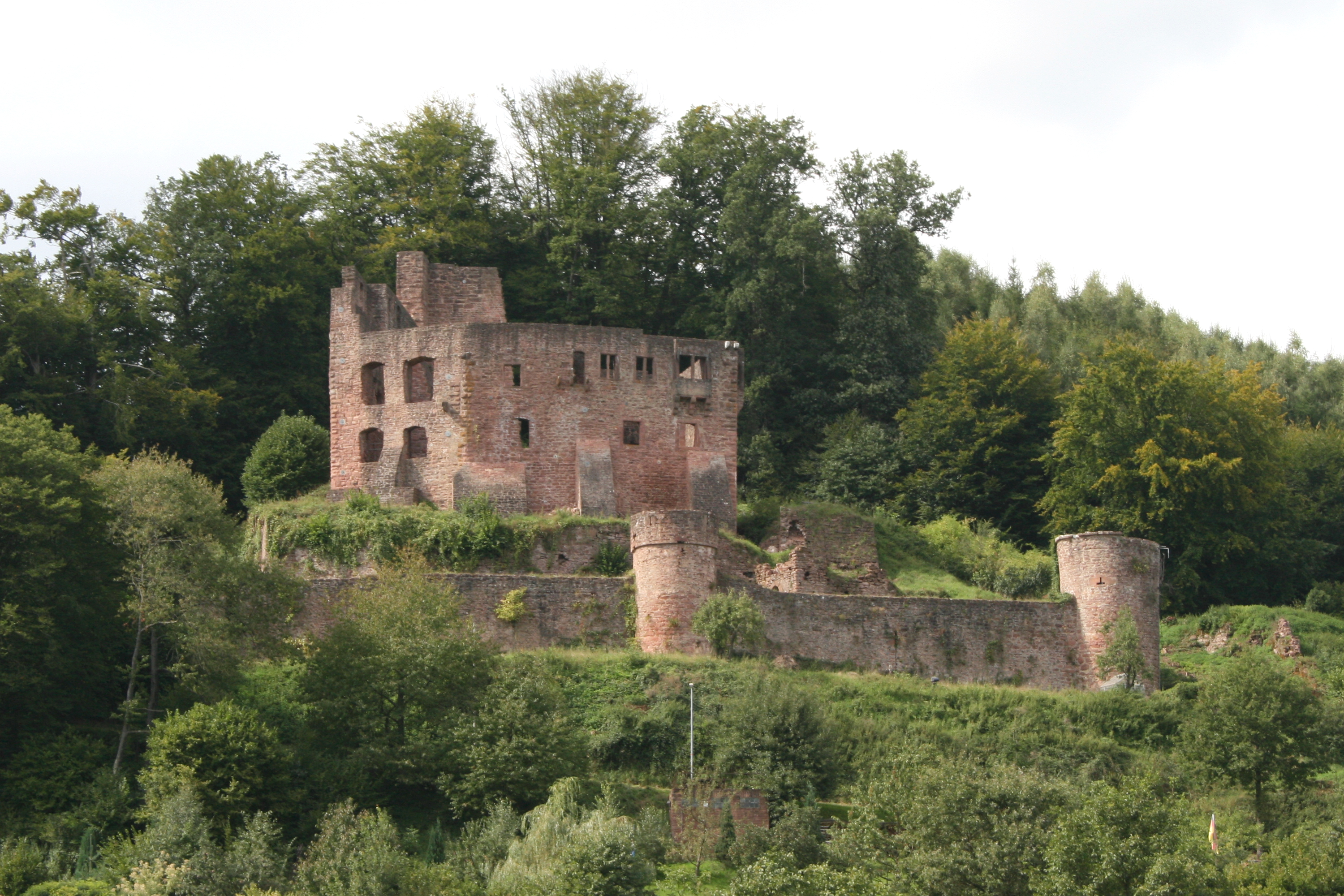
Freienstein castle

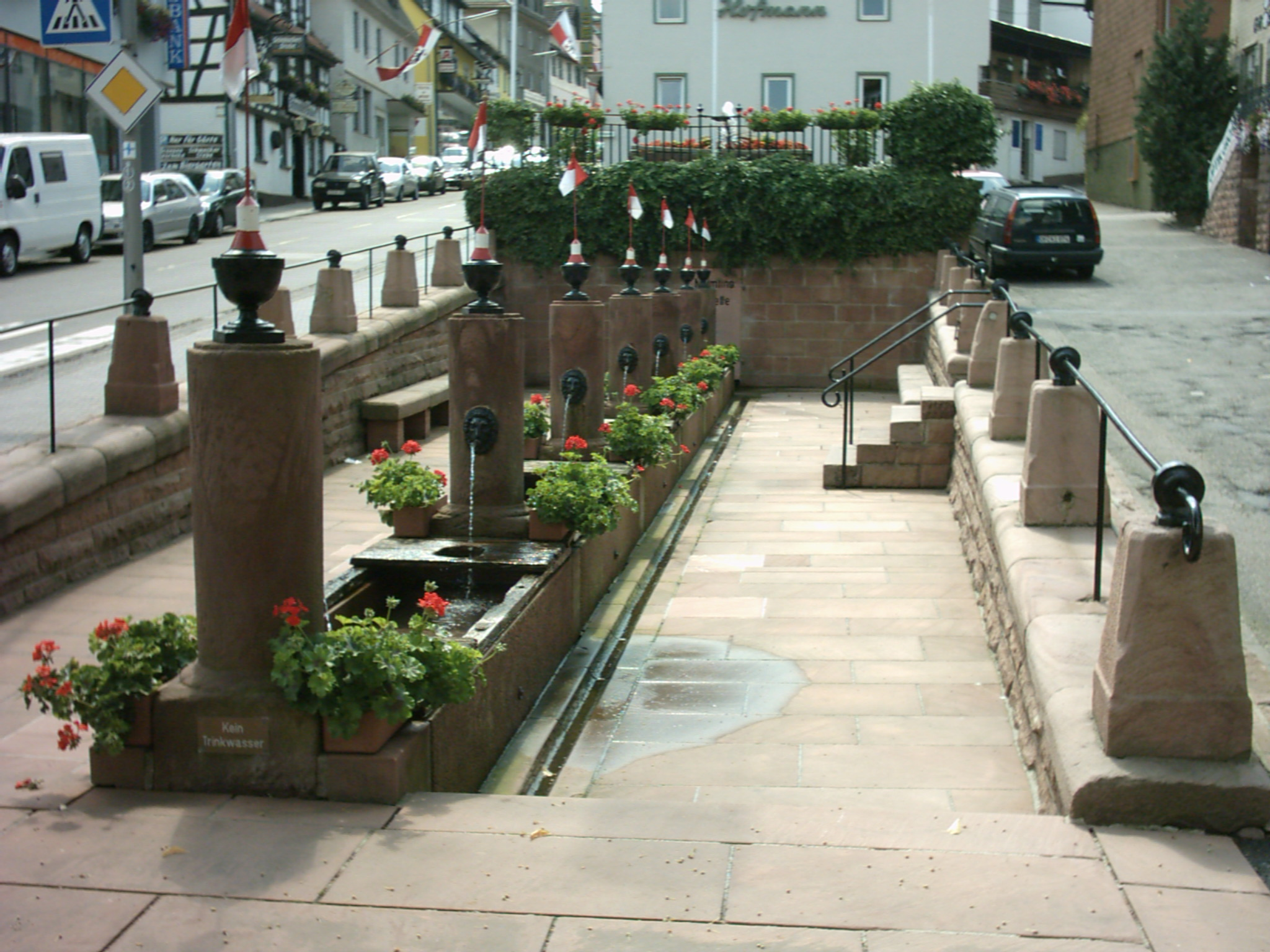
Zwölf-Röhren-Brunnen

=== Buildings ===
Beerfelden has Germany's only completely preserved gallows. They were built in 1597 to replace the simple wooden gallows. The last hanging here took place in 1804 when, it is said, a Gypsy woman was put to death, apparently after she stole a chicken and two loaves of bread for her sick child.

The spot was supposedly chosen for its lovely setting, in the hope that the condemned prisoner's punishment would thereby seem all the worse. It might also have been chosen for the chilling effect that the sight of the hanged criminal would have. There are also the iron bands that hold the six-metre-tall red sandstone posts together. These were replaced long ago. Allegedly, they were torn out in 1814 by some Cossacks who were camping here so that they could shoe their horses. Around the gallows stand seven lindens that serve as a reminder of the old “Thing’s” jurisdiction. There stood a so-called Zentlinde (“tithe linden”), before which sentences were passed. The tree is said to have stood at the town's current outskirts, but no trace of it remains today.

Beerfelden also has the Zwölf-Röhren-Brunnen (“Twelve-Pipe Spring”), the source of the river Mümling. It was built in 1810.

=== Nature ===
- ”Fat Oak near Airlenbach” (Dicke Eiche bei Airlenbach) – a dead pedunculate oak tree trunk measuring 8.3 m in circumference one metre above the ground.

=== Regular events ===
- The Beerfelder Pferde-, Fohlen- und Zuchtviehmarkt (“Beerfelden Horse, Foal and Breeding Cattle Market”) has taken place every year on the second weekend in July. The traditional livestock market on Monday is Hesse's biggest breeding cattle show. One of the market's other highlights is the riding and jumping tournament.
- The Beerfelder Kerwe (church consecration festival) takes place yearly on the first weekend in October. It has been staged since 2006 at the Markt- und Sportgelände (“Market and Sport Grounds”) in Beerfelden.
- On 3 October in the carpark at the Zwölf-Röhren-Brunnen, the Beerfelder Herbstmarkt (autumn market) is held. The exhibitors at this market are business owners and clubs from the Beerfelder Land.
- At Ascension, in honour of the Zwölf-Röhren-Brunnen, the Beerfelder Brunnenfest (“Beerfelden Spring Festival”) takes place. Shops are open on this day and there are displays by various businesses, traditional arts and crafts and a great flea market. The Spring Festival runs through the town's streets. The Metzkeil (a street) forms the market's midpoint and is also the town's.

== Famous people ==
=== Sons and daughters of the town ===
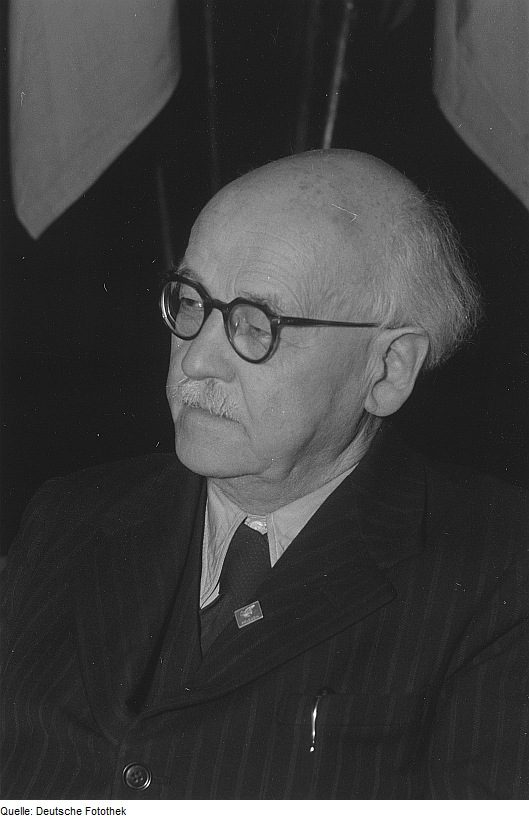
Emil Fuchs 1952

- Christian Heinrich Braun (1847–1911), German surgeon
- Jan Holschuh (1909–2000), German sculptor
- Emil Fuchs (1874–1971), German theologian, professor in Leipzig
- Lukas Billick (b. 1988), German footballer, grew up in Beerfelden.
- Christian Kumpf (1838–1904), emigrant to Canada who became mayor of Waterloo, Ontario

=== People connected with the town ===
- Horst Schnur (b. 1942), Odenwaldkreis District Administrator, lives in Beerfelden since 1969.
- Michael Reuter (b. 1948), Member of Odenwaldkreis Landtag, lives in Beerfelden since 2003.
- Jennifer Lang, Selected as Team Member Representative from Germany for McDonald's at 2012 London Olympic Games.

== Economy and infrastructure ==
=== Tourism ===
Near Beerfelden, on the Sensbacher Höhe (heights) is a winter sport area with a ski run and cross-country skiing trails, which are often not groomed, but are nonetheless gridlocked. When the snowfalls come in winter, the winter sport area is opened. On the only ski run can be found one of the Odenwald's few skilifts. It is 450 m long and reaches 540 m above sea level. Moreover, there are a smaller lift on the slope's lower reaches, a snowmaking facility, floodlights and a snow grooming vehicle. The heights have a state-championship-standard snowboarding and downhill run.

=== Transport ===
Beerfelden lies on Bundesstraße 45, which runs in a great bend round the town. In the outlying centre of Hetzbach is a railway station on the Odenwaldbahn (railway; RMV Line 65).

The railway connection from Hetzbach to Beerfelden, opened in 1904, was closed in 1954. It was run in its time by the Süddeutsche Eisenbahn-Gesellschaft (SEG, “South German Railway Company”).
