= Gelita =

German manufacturer of gelatin and collagen

GELITA AG

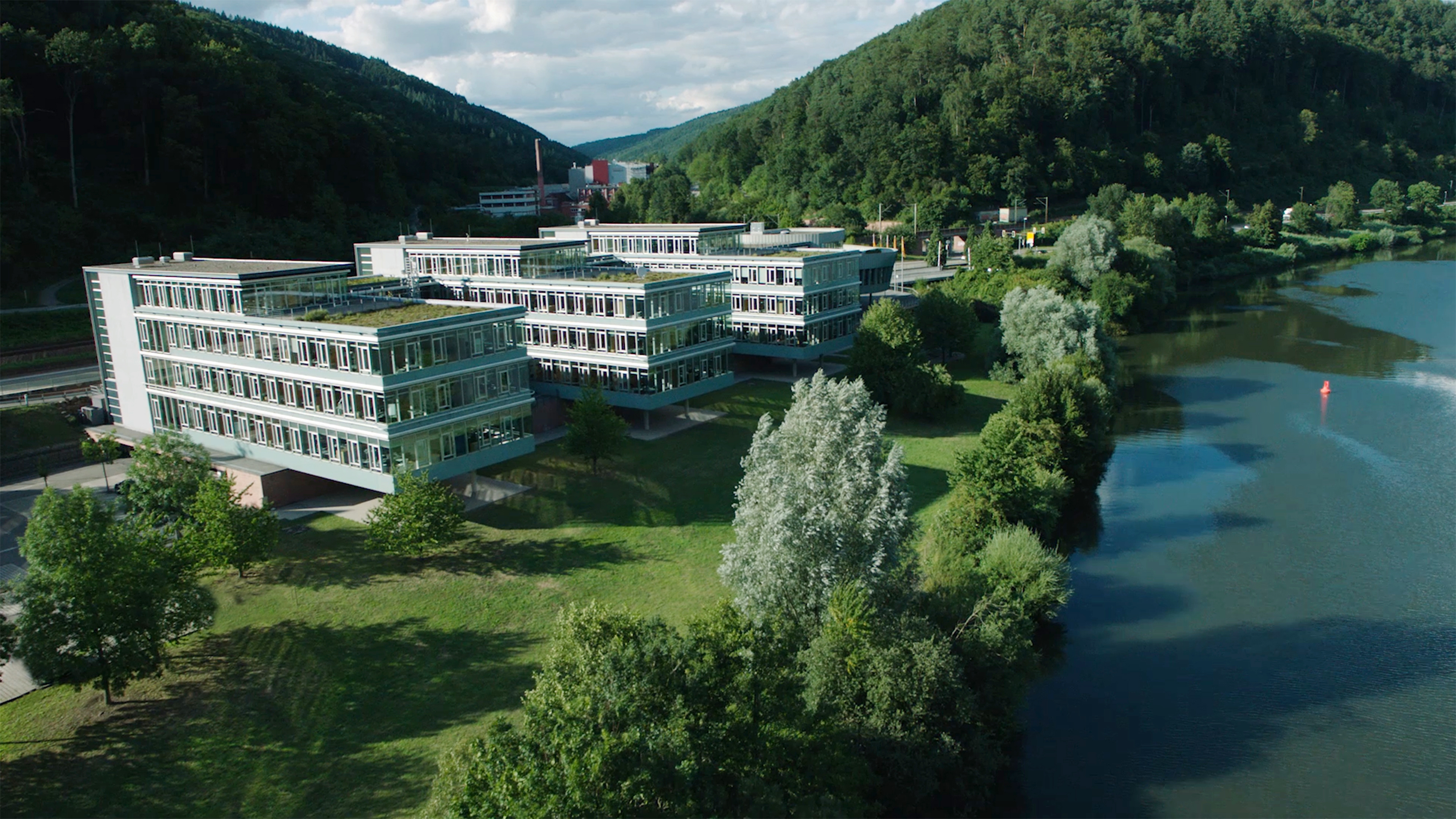
- Headquarters building
- Type: Closed joint stock company
- Industry: Food
- Founded: 1875
- Headquarters: Eberbach, Germany
- Area served: Worldwide
- Key people: Dr. Peter Hill (CEO)
- Revenue: 750 mill. Euros (2018)
- Number of employees: 2,598
- Website: www.gelita.com/en

Gelita AG is a manufacturer of gelatin and collagen peptides for the food, health and nutrition, pharmaceutical industries and for several technical applications. It is headquartered in Eberbach, Germany.

Founded in 1875, Gelita operates 21 production sites and 4 offices in North America, South America, Europe, South Africa, Asia, Australia and New Zealand. The plant in Sergeant Bluff, Iowa, is the largest gelatin factory in the world.

== History ==
The history of today's Gelita AG in Eberbach dates back to 1875, when the production of gelatin was started in Schweinfurt. Gelita was preceded by the founding of the "Gebrüder Köpff Company", Heinrich Koepff's small tannery, in 1883. Shaken by the economic crisis of the time, Heinrich saw a way out of his misery in gelatin production. The raw material for this could be purchased cheaply, as it was produced in the large tanneries as residual material. With around 60 employees, the factory was already producing photographic gelatin in 1884, which was an important material for the rapidly emerging photography in the 19th century. In 1887, the Koepff brothers acquired the competing company A. & C. Wolff in Heilbronn. Both locations had 320 employees who produced 400 tonnes of gelatin per year. In 1901, a major fire destroyed large parts of the factory. The brothers quarreled over reconstruction. Heinrich went to Heilbronn and Paul Koepff continued to run the rebuilt plant alone under the name Göppinger Gelatin Factory Paul Koepff. In 1911, he sold the factory to DGF AG, which already operated gelatin factories in Schweinfurt and Höchst. Paul Koepff was henceforth on the board of directors and continued to manage his former company as director. In 1929, Paul Koepff jr. took over the management of the Göppingen plant from his father, who died in 1953. The Gelita Brand was introduced in 1934. In 1937, the DGF was accused of violating foreign trade regulations and leading employees were arrested. Stoess, on the other hand, had reestablished relations with Eastman Kodak in the United States and was bringing large quantities of much-needed foreign exchange to Germany. After World War II, Paul Koepff Jr. became managing director of the Stoess company in Eberbach. In 1949, he built up a gelatin capsule factory there. In the course of the decades, DGF AG bought various factories worldwide. In 1965, it was taken over by the "Chem. Werke Stoess" in Heidelberg. In that year Heinrich Koepff took over the majority of shares of the Göppingen plant and through his marriage to the granddaughter of the company founder, Gerda Stoess, the companies merged. In 1972, the association traded under the name DGF Stoess & Co. GmbH. In 1989, the company was converted into a public limited company. The gelatin production division was renamed the Gelita Group in 1999. In 2005, all entities started to sell gelatine under the brand name Gelita.

== Products ==
=== Gelatin ===
In 2021, Gelatin is a translucent, colorless, flavorless food ingredient, commonly derived from collagen taken from animal body parts. Gelita ranked second in the gelatin category of FoodTalks' Global Food Thickener Companies List.

=== Collagen peptides ===
For oral supplementation in sectors like healthy aging, sports nutrition and beauty. Applications are for example food, drinks, cereals, bars and dietary supplements.

=== Fats, minerals and proteins ===
Are produced when collagen proteins are manufactured. The main areas of application for Fat, Mineral and Protein Ingredients are human food, pet food and animal feed. The fats, for example, serve as energy sources. Proteins can improve the texture and hence the enjoyability and digestibility of foodstuffs and animal feed. Further applications are in technical areas and are used in the manufacture of bone china, construction molds, lubricants for machines and anti-rust agents.

=== Hemostats ===
Hemostasis blood-staunching sponges for medical applications. They are used for injuries of the blood vessels to stop the bleeding for example during operations. Hemostats can be broken down by the body. For this reason, they remain in the body and the wound can stay closed.

== Applications ==
The products based on collagen proteins are used for food, health and nutrition, pharmaceutical industries and technical applications for example Photo, Ballistic, Restoration, Lubricants, Technical detergents.

Market segments (Status: February 2020)
In percent	Application
55%	Food
29%	Pharmaceutical
14%	Collagen Peptides
2%	Other

== Organisation ==
Gelita AG is structured as a holding company. The group is controlled from the headquarter in Eberbach (Germany).

=== Production sites ===
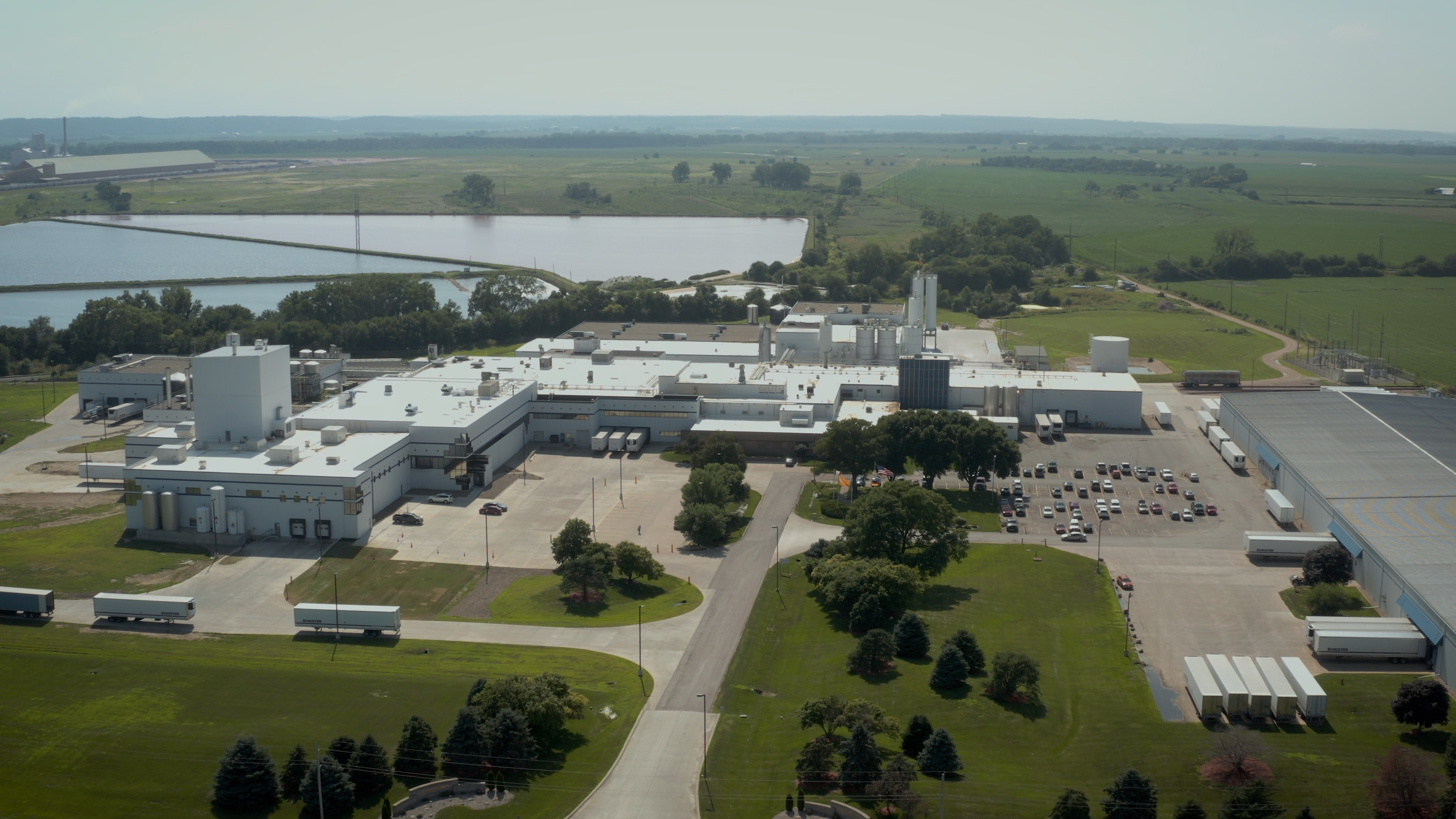
The plant in Sergeant Bluff, Iowa

- West Krugersdorp, South Africa, Beef Hide
- Liaoyuan, China, Bone
- Pingyang, China, Pork Hide, Beef Hide
- Eberbach, (HQ), Germany, Beef Hide, Bone
- Göppingen, Germany, Pork Skin
- Memmingen, Germany, Bovine Bone Preparation
- Minden, Germany, Pork Skin
- Klippan, Sweden, Pork Skin
- Ter Apelkanaal, Netherlands, Pork Skin
- Ter Apelkanaal, Netherlands, Functional Proteins(Joint Venture)
- Sergeant Bluff, Iowa, United States, Pork Skin Plant
- Sergeant Bluff, Iowa, United States, 2 Beef Bone Plants
- Sergeant Bluff, Iowa, United States, CP Plant
- Calumet City, Illinois, United States, Pork Skin
- Lerma, State of Mexico
- León, Mexico, Pilsac (Joint Venture)
- Mococa, Brazil, Beef Hide
- Cotia, Brazil, Milling/ Blending
- Maringá, Brazil, Beef Hide
- Beaudesert, Australia, Beef Hide
- Christchurch, New Zealand

=== Offices ===
- Holmes Chapel, United Kingdom
- Shanghai, China
- Bangkok, Thailand
- Tokyo, Japan

=== Subsidiaries ===
- Gelita Deutschland GmbH, Eberbach, Germany
- ATRO ProVita GmbH, Eberbach, Germany
- Gelita Health GmbH, Eberbach, Germany
- Gelita Medical GmbH, Eberbach, Germany

== Awards ==
- German Innovation Award. Excellence in Business to Business – Pharmaceuticals, Winner 2019 German Innovation Award, Fortibone January 2020
- Nutra Ingredients Awards. Ingredient of the Year: Healthy Ageing – Fortibone, GELITA – 2018, Winner 2018, January 2020
- Life PR Award: German Innovation Award in gold for innovative detergent additive Novotec CB800, June 6, 2018
- Nutraceuticals World: Top 100 Innovative Companies in Germany, Category "Innovative Processes"
- Cannes Corporate Media & TV Awards 2016: Four Dolphins for the company Video "You can see". Gold in category corporate videos and silver in the categories marketing films – B2B, information films and visitors films
- German Brand Award for successful brand management in the category "Industry Excellence in Branding", 2016
- "Intermedia-globe Award" in gold, World Media Festival June 22, 2016
- Frost & Sullivan Award, "European Health Ingredient of the Year" – 2008 New Hope, "GELITA Wins Frost & Sullivan Award European Health Ingredient of the Year 2008"
