= Kirchzell =

- Municipality
- Coat of arms

- Location of Kirchzell within Miltenberg district
- Interactive map of Kirchzell
- Location within Germany Location within Bavaria
- Coordinates: 49°37′N 09°11′E
- Country: Germany
- State: Bavaria
- Admin. region: Unterfranken
- District: Miltenberg
- Subdivisions: 7 Ortsteile

Government
  - Mayor (2020–26): Stefan Schwab (CSU)

Area
  - Total: 63.86 km^{2} (24.66 sq mi)
- Elevation: 192 m (630 ft)

Population (2025-12-31)
  - Total: 2,193
  - Density: 34.34/km^{2} (88.94/sq mi)
- Time zone: UTC+01:00 (CET)
  - Summer (DST): UTC+02:00 (CEST)
- Postal codes: 63931
- Dialling codes: 09373
- Vehicle registration: MIL
- Website: www.kirchzell.de

Kirchzell is a market municipality in the Miltenberg district in the Regierungsbezirk of Lower Franconia (Unterfranken) in Bavaria, Germany.

== Geography ==
=== Location ===
This community in the Odenwald lies at the three-state common point shared by Bavaria, Hesse and Baden-Württemberg.

Kirchzell is the biggest municipality by land area in the Miltenberg district with a great deal of woodland, and it lies in the Geo-Naturpark Bergstraße-Odenwald. The area, whose geology is bunter-based, is drained by the Waldbach, Gabelbach and Mud into the Main.

Nearby towns include Amorbach, Erbach, Michelstadt, Miltenberg, Mudau and Walldürn.

=== Constituent communities ===
Kirchzell's Ortsteile are Breitenbach, Breitenbuch, Buch, Kirchzell, Ottorfszell, Preunschen and Watterbach.

== History ==
Kirchzell is a community with a 1,200-year history. Kirchzell owes its founding and its name to the Benedictine abbey in Amorbach. In 1168, the Amorbach Abbey and thereby also Kirchzell ended up under the lordship of the Lords of Dürn. This princely family built Wildenberg Castle (Burg Wildenberg) upon the Preunschener Berg, a highlight in Staufer-era castle building. One hundred years later, the Lords of Dürn sold the Archbishop of Mainz their estates. In 1700, Kirchzell was granted market rights, as it was the middle point of the Kirchzeller Grund.

The Electoral Mainz Amt was assigned in the 1803 Reichsdeputationshauptschluss to the Princes of Leiningen, later being mediatized by Baden in 1806 and then in 1810 ceded to the Hesse-Darmstadt. In the Hesse-Bavaria Rezess (Frankfurt 1816) it finally passed to Bavaria.

=== Development of the municipal area ===
The market community of Kirchzell merged itself in the course of municipal reform with the communities of Watterbach, Ottorfszell and Preunschen, along with their outlying centres of Breitenbuch and Buch, and with the hamlets of Dörnbach, Breitenbach, Schrahmühle and Hofmühle into the current greater community.

== Politics ==
=== Community council ===
The council is made up of 14 council members with seats apportioned thus:

- CSU 6 seats
- FWG 5 seats
- SPD 3 seats

=== Coat of arms ===
The community's arms might be described thus: Gules a church argent, the portal turned to the viewer, the steeple and the portal ensigned with a cross sable, in chief dexter the head of an abbot's staff Or, in chief sinister a wheel spoked of six of the second.

The church is a canting charge for the community's name (“church” is Kirche in German). The abbot's crook recalls the Amorbach Benedictine abbey's hegemony and landlordship in the community (this, incidentally, made the community a “cell” in the monastic sense of a monastery outpost, which explains the placename ending —zell; the place was originally called Celle), and the Wheel of Mainz recalls Electoral Mainz’s rule after that.

The arms have been borne since 1964.

== Economy and infrastructure ==
=== Transport ===
Kirchzell lies roughly 45 km from the interchange on the Autobahn A 81 and roughly 50 km from the interchange on the A 3.

The nearest InterCityExpress stop is the railway station at Aschaffenburg, some 51 km away, but there are also Regionalbahn trains at Amorbach only 6 km away.

As for air transport, it is roughly 89 km to Frankfurt Airport.

== Culture and sightseeing ==
=== Museums ===
- Forest museum at the Watterbacher Haus in the outlying centre of Preunschen: The Watterbacher Haus is a so-called Wohnstallhaus, one designed to house both a farmer and his livestock, and is said to be one of the oldest farmhouses in the Odenwald. The Firstständerhaus (its original name) was built in 1475, and it originally stood in Watterbach. In 1982 it was moved to Preunschen. In the forest museum, the development of the Odenwald’s forest history, the forest’s use in earlier times, basketweaving and

=== Buildings ===
- Remnants of the Limes Germanicus, once a defensive wall of the Romans against the Germanic natives.
- Wildenberg Castle ruins from the High Middle Ages (also called the Wildenburg), built in the Staufer era, where Wolfram von Eschenbach is said to have written parts of his Parzival.
- The Odenwald’s oldest Bildstock (a post serving as a small place of worship) from 1483, in Breitenbach.
- Jimmys Mimosenhouse

== Music ==
Kirchzell has had since 1891 a singing club, which has since grown into four choirs.

- Men’s choir (since 1891)
- Women’s choir (since 1999)
- VoCapella (since 2002)
- Piccolino (since 2005)

The men's and women's choirs and VoCapella are under Hermann Trunk's leadership. Piccolino is led by Carolin Czerny.

== Famous People ==
- Bernd Roos (* 1. September 1967 in Miltenberg) - former German handball player
- Heiko Grimm (* 18. November 1977 in Miltenberg) - former German handball player
- Andreas Kunz (* 20. July 1982 in Miltenberg) - former German handball player

== Sport ==
- The men's handball team of the TV Kirchzell (gymnastic club) is playing in the 3rd league (Mid) in the 2020/2021 season.
- FC Kickers Kirchzell was founded in 1922 and in the 2008/2009 season is playing in the Aschaffenburg district class group 3
