= Eberbach (Baden) =

- Town
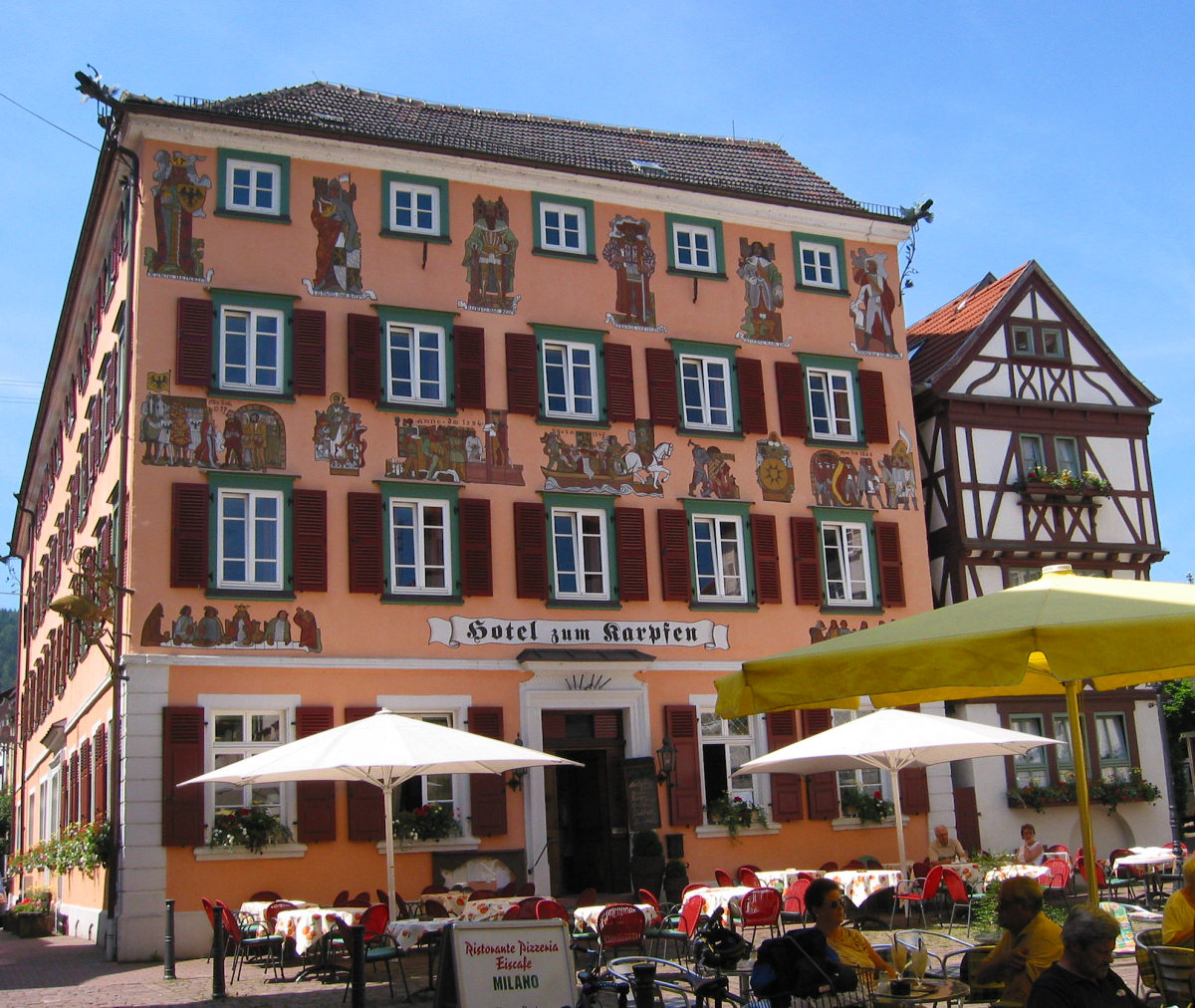
- Hotel Karpfen

- Coat of arms

- Location of Eberbach within Rhein-Neckar-Kreis district
- Interactive map of Eberbach
- Location within Germany Location within Baden-Württemberg
- Coordinates: 49°28′N 08°59′E
- Country: Germany
- State: Baden-Württemberg
- Admin. region: Karlsruhe
- District: Rhein-Neckar-Kreis

Government
  - Mayor (2020–28): Peter Reichert (Ind.)

Area
  - Total: 81.15 km^{2} (31.33 sq mi)
- Elevation: 134 m (440 ft)

Population (2025-12-31)
  - Total: 14,729
  - Density: 181.5/km^{2} (470.1/sq mi)
- Time zone: UTC+01:00 (CET)
  - Summer (DST): UTC+02:00 (CEST)
- Postal codes: 69401–69412
- Dialling codes: 06271
- Vehicle registration: HD
- Website: www.eberbach.de

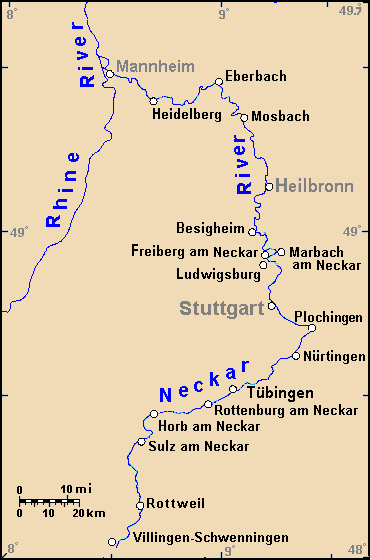
Eberbach on Neckar River

Eberbach (German pronunciation: [ˈeːbɐbax]; South Franconian: Ewwerbach) is a town in Germany, in northern Baden-Württemberg, located 33 km east of Heidelberg. It belongs to the Rhein-Neckar-Kreis. Its sister cities are Ephrata, United States and Thonon-les-Bains, France.

== Geography ==
=== Location ===
Eberbach lies at the foot of the Katzenbuckel, at 626 m the highest elevation in the Odenwald, in the Naturpark Neckartal-Odenwald, on the romantic Burgenstraße (Castle Road) along the river Neckar.

=== Boroughs ===
Eberbach includes the boroughs of Neckarwimmersbach, Brombach, Friedrichsdorf, Lindach, Rockenau, Badisch Igelsbach, Gaimühle, Unterdielbach, Badisch Schöllenbach and Pleutersbach.

The border with Hesse runs through the borough of Igelsbach. Therefore, only the northeast half, called Badisch Igelsbach, of the borough belongs to Eberbach. The southwest half, called Hessisch Igelsbach, belongs to the Hessian municipality of Hirschhorn. The same is true for the borough Schöllenbach. The larger part of Schöllenbach belongs to the municipality of Hesseneck.

== History ==
Eberbach is a former Imperial Free City, founded soon after 1227—when the castle was first mentioned—by German King Henry VII of the House of Hohenstaufen. After his pledge to the Counts Palatine in 1330, the old Free City belonged to the Electorate of the Palatinate.

In 1803, it passed to the Principality of Leiningen, and since 1806 it has belonged to Baden. Until 1924, it was the seat of the authority office (Bezirksamt). In 1977 the town celebrated its 750-year jubilee.

== Main sights ==
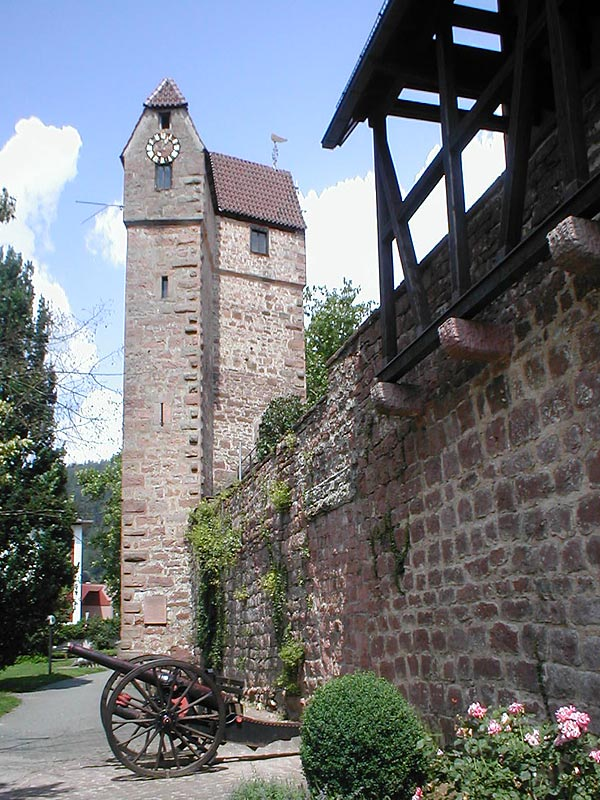
Pulverturm

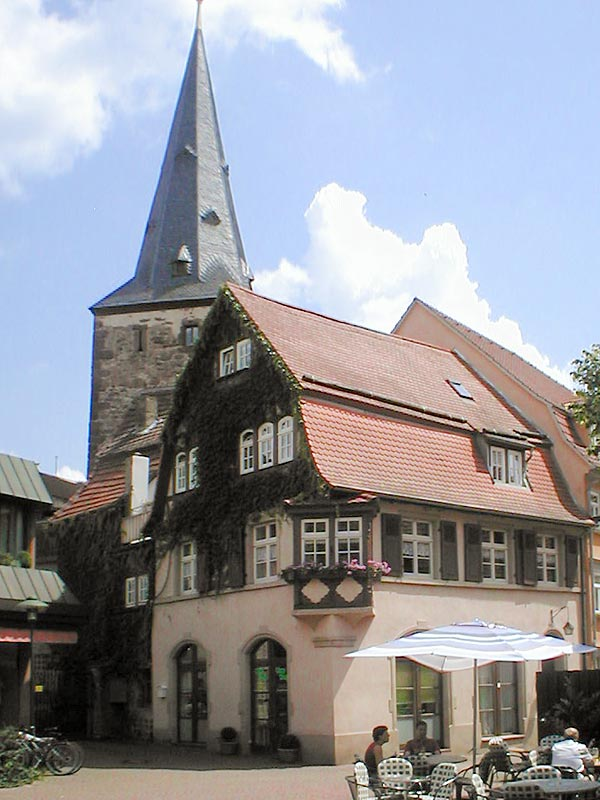
Haspelturm und Spohrsches Haus

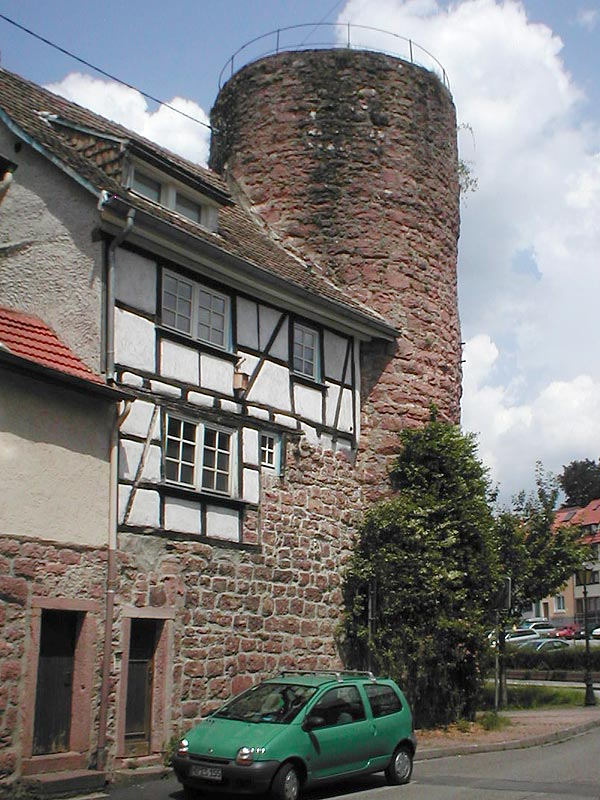
Rosenturm

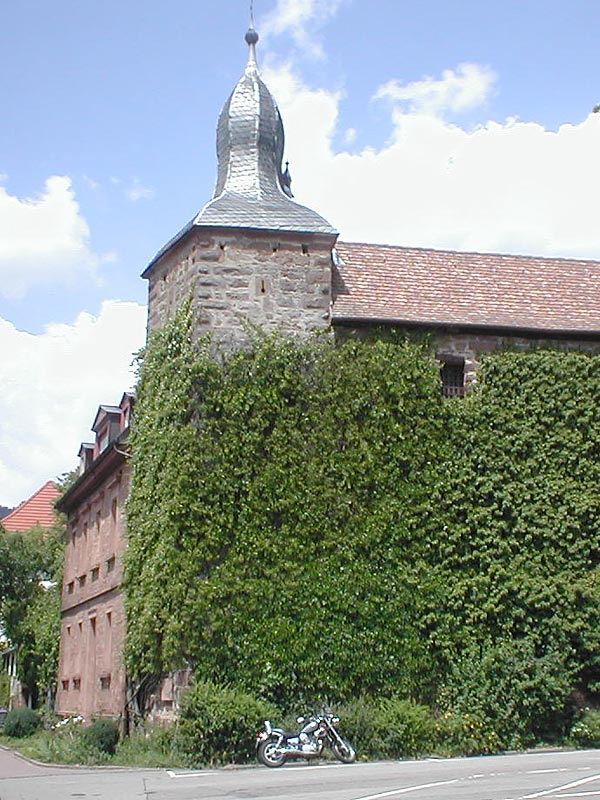
Blauer Hut

The historic old town, which is a pedestrian precinct, with its four well maintained towers, many well kept timber-frame houses and some town wall remnants, is a magnet for tourists. Likewise, the Eberbach castle ruins, which stand above the town on one of the mountains in the Odenwald range that surrounds the town, are worthy of sightseeing as part of the string of castles along the river Neckar. Eberbach also lies on the Burgenstraße (Castle Road), which leads from Mannheim all the way to Prague.

The Ohrsberg is a peak in Eberbach. It shapes the town and is 229 m (751 ft) high.

=== Museums ===
Several museums can be found in Eberbach:

- Heimatmuseum der Stadt Eberbach — Museum of Local History for the Town of Eberbach
- Küfereimuseum — cooperage museum
- Zinnfiguren-Kabinett — tin figures

== Government ==
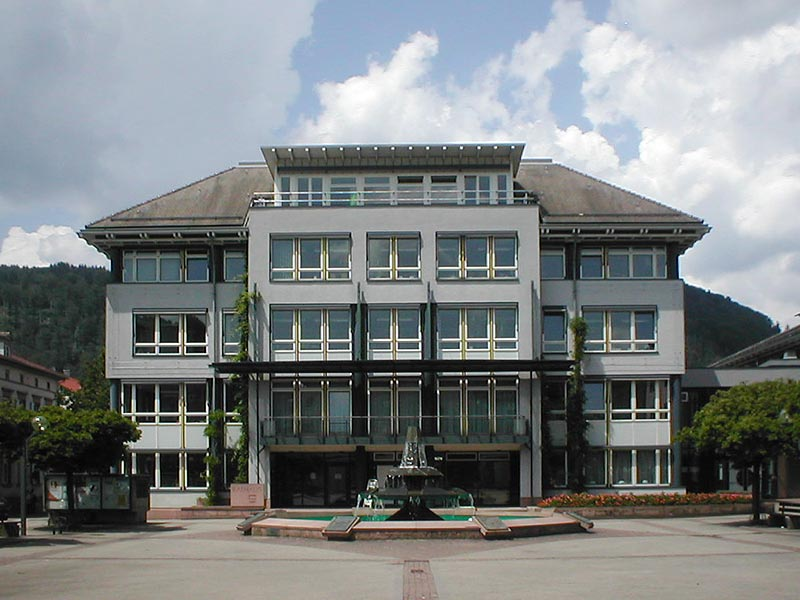
Eberbach town hall

=== Municipal council ===
Eberbach town council has 22 members, who are elected every five years. The 2014 election was as follows:

Local council 2014
Party	Votes	Seats
CDU	26,2 % (−6,3)	6 (−1)
SPD	29,2 % (+1,9)	6 (+/−0)
Free voters Baden-Württemberg	26,9 % (+1,7)	6 (+/−0)
Alternative Green List	17,7 % (+2,6)	4 (+1)
Turnout 52,35 %

=== Mayor ===
The mayor is directly elected for eight years.

- 1872–1892: Daniel Heinrich Knecht (1828–1913)
- 1892–1893: Wilhelm Heiß
- 1893–1927: John Gustav Weiß (1857–1943)
- 1927–1931: Karl Frank (1900–1974)
- 1935–1940: Hermann Schmeisser
- 1948–1954: Curt Nenninger (SPD)
- 1954–1972: Hermann Schmeisser
- 1972–1996: Horst Schlesinger
- 1996–2013: Bernhard Martin (CDU)
- since 2013: Peter Reichert (independent)

Reichert was elected in October 2012 with 64,2 % of the votes.

=== Coat of arms ===
Description: (source: Archiv der Stadt Eberbach, Dr. Rüdiger Lenz, Archive Head)

Eberbach's coat of arms is heraldically described thus: Argent (white or silver) on lowered fess wavy azure a boar striding sable. This makes the coat of arms a rebus of the town's name – a "canting" coat of arms – since it shows a boar (Eber in German) and a wavy blue line representing a brook (Bach in German). Eberbach's flag is blue and white (or blue and silver).

As an Imperial City, Eberbach would have had leave originally to have its arms bear the Imperial eagle. The Imperial eagle was once to be found in the town wall at the upper gate. A photograph taken of it in 1909, along with the armorial stone itself, are today kept in the Town Museum, where they may be seen. The current coat of arms has been established to be from a seal impression dating back to 1387. The boar's appearance, however, in today's arms, adopted in 1976, is clearly unlike the original.

== Cultural events ==
The following events are held yearly:

- Apfeltag (Apple Day) – mid-October
- Bärlauchtage (Bear Garlic Days) - mid-March to mid-April celebrate Ramsons
- Frühlingsfest (Spring Festival) - mid-May
- Kuckucksmarkt (Cuckoo Market): Eberbach's Cuckoo Market is a folk festival on the last weekend of August. The name traces itself back to an old traditional story. According to the tale, an Eberbacher (from the main town north of the Neckar) in an inn in Neckarwimmersbach (on the south bank) was served a cuckoo, rather than the pigeon that he had ordered. This he then proceeded to consume. The Cuckoo Market is held in Neckarwimmersbach at the "In der Au" sports grounds and in several streets (Schwanheimer Straße, Beckstraße, Neckarbrücke). It was once held on the Neckar's north bank between Pulverturm and Grüner Baum, which is nowadays where the aforesaid Spring Festival is held.

== Economy and infrastructure ==
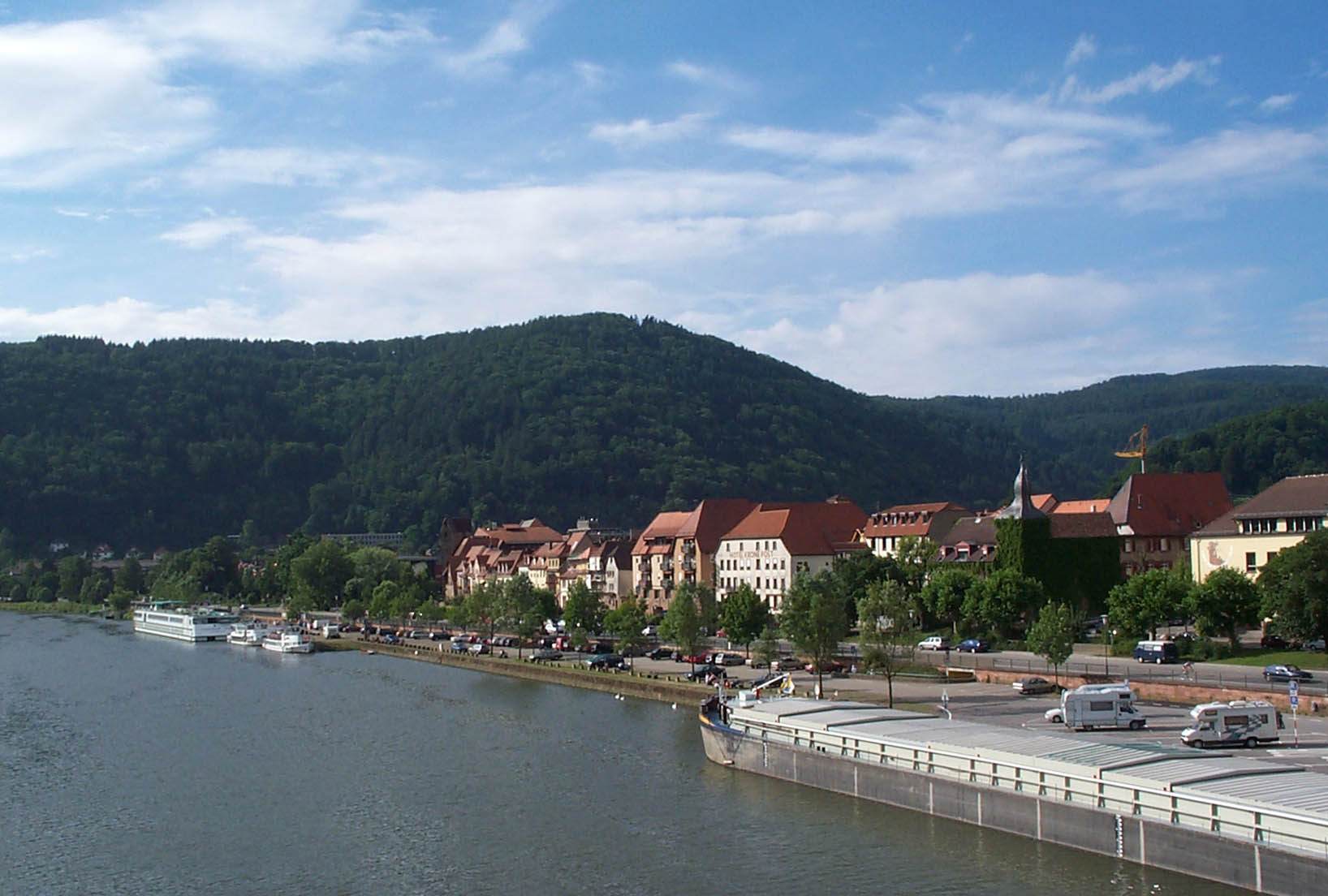
View from Neckar lookout

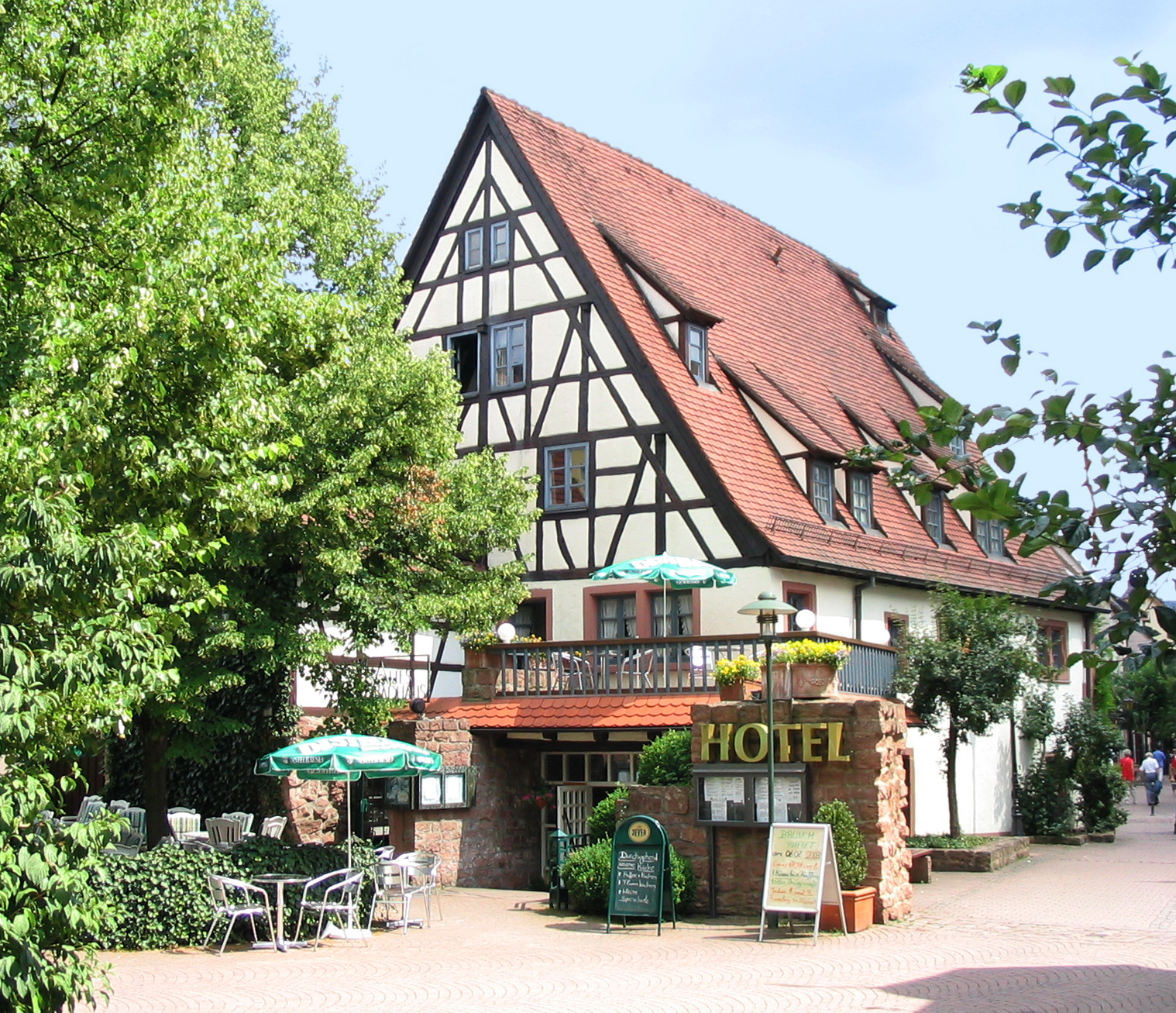
Old Bathhouse

=== Transport ===
The S 1/2 lines of the Rhine-Neckar S-Bahn run half-hourly along the Neckar Valley Railway towards Mosbach and Heidelberg/Mannheim. Moreover, regional express trains shuttle along this same right of way two-hourly bound for Mannheim and Heilbronn. Regional trains also run every two hours along the Odenwaldbahn to Darmstadt and Frankfurt.

Eberbach, unlike most towns of comparable size, maintains its own transport system, the Stadtwerke Eberbach (SWE). The fleet comprises all together 6 buses which weekdays serve the main routes (Ledigsberg and Eberbach/Nord) from 5:10 to 19:30 half-hourly, and lesser routes irregularly. Saturdays the buses run from 6:30 to 14:50. At the Spring Festival and the Cuckoo Market, special services are laid on. In the latter case, the service runs quite late into the evening to accommodate "marketgoers".

The town transport serves the following routes:

- 801, 807: Railway station – Ledigsberg
- 802, 802a, 809: Railway station – Eberbach/Nord
- 803: Railway station – Rockenau
- 804: Railway station – Igelsbach
- 805: Railway station – Holdergrund
- 806: Hirschhorn – Brombach; this line is run by the Heckmann firm on the SWE's behalf.

Furthermore, the Verkehrsverbund Rhein-Neckar (VRN) and Rhein-Main-Verkehrsverbund (RMV) transport systems serve various regional bus routes.

Eberbach also lies on the well-used Bundesstraßen (Federal Highways) B37 and B45.

=== Established enterprises ===
Eberbach is headquarters to the world's biggest gelatin producer, Gelita, the textile machine factory Dilo, the rowboat building yard Empacher and the ticket vending and fare collecting machine manufacturer, Krauth Technology, whose products are sold worldwide. The headquarters of the Neckardraht Group (wire makers) is likewise also found in the town on the Neckar. A site of the contract pharmaceutical manufacturer Catalent Pharma Solutions (formerly known as R. P. Scherer) is also based in Eberbach.

=== Media ===
- The Eberbacher Zeitung is a daily newspaper built on groundwork laid out by the Südwest-Presse, an Ulm newspaper.
- The Rhein-Neckar-Zeitung maintains its own local editing in Eberbach and publishes a special Eberbach and area edition (Eberbacher Nachrichten).
- The Eberbach-Channel (see link below) is an online information service for Eberbach and area.

=== Education ===
- Steigegrundschule
- Dr.-Weiß Grund- und Förderschule
- Hauptschule Eberbach
- Realschule Eberbach
- Hohenstaufen-Gymnasium
- Gewerbeschule Eberbach

== Health services ==
Hospital of the Gesundheitszentren Rhein Neckar GmbH (GRN)

- Internal medicine
- Surgery
- Urology
- Anaesthesia
- HNO
- Gynaecology
- Proctology
- Short-term care
- Physiotherapy
- Training for nursing

== Notable people ==
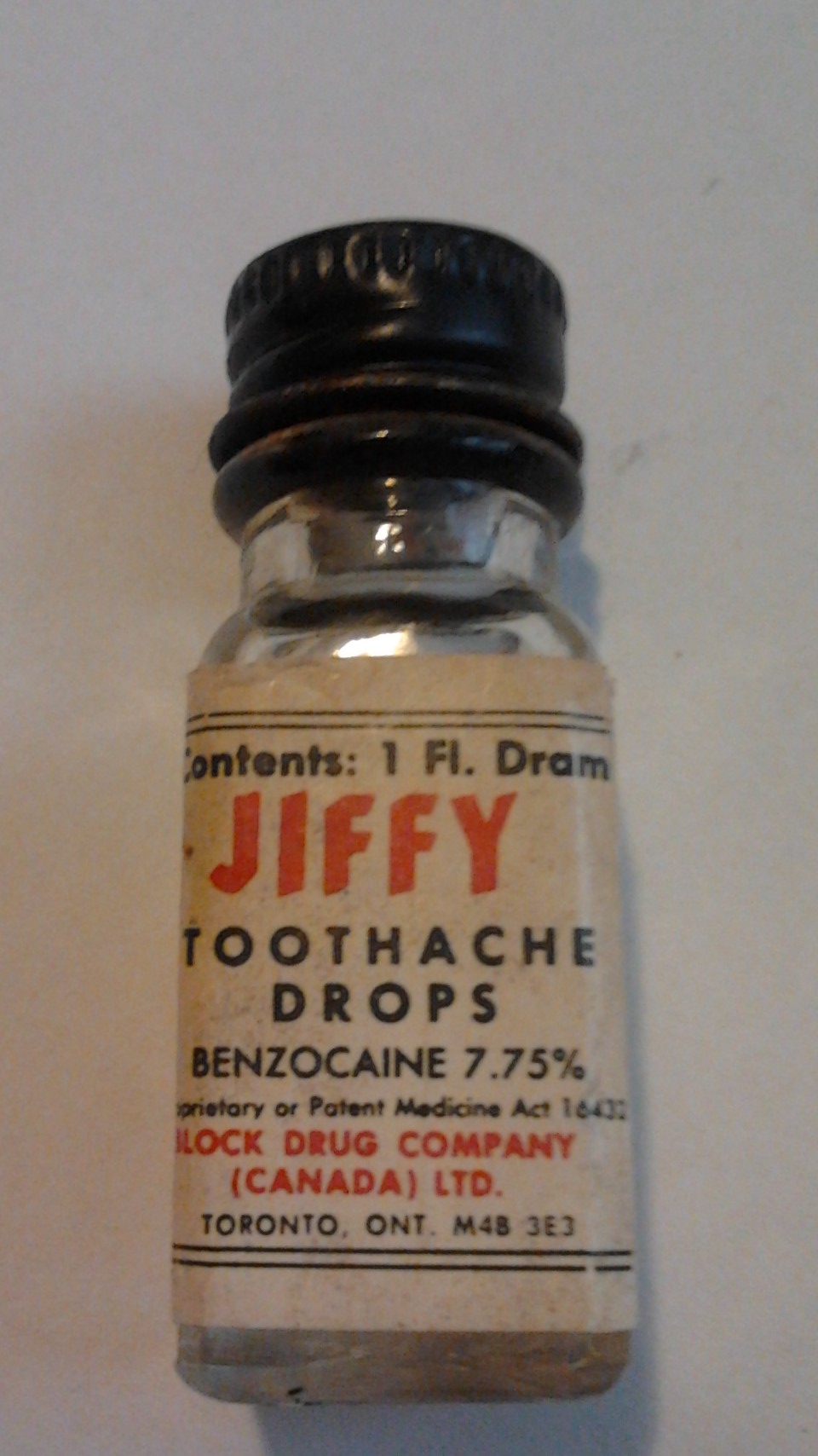
Jiffy Toothache Drops, made from Benzocaine

- Conrad Beissel (1691-1768), emigrant who founded the Ephrata monastery in Ephrata, Pennsylvania.
- Eduard Ritsert (1859–1946), chemist, inventor of Benzocaine
- Theodor Haecker (1879–1945), writer, translator and cultural critic; translated Søren Kierkegaard
- Robert Heinrich Wagner (1895-1946), Nazi Party functionary, Gauleiter of Baden and "chief of the civil administration" in occupied Alsace, executed for war crimes
- Alfred Wolf (1915–2004) was a German-born American rabbi in Los Angeles
- Nico Hammann (born 1988), footballer who has played over 400 games

== International relations ==
Eberbach (Baden) is twinned with:

- Thonon-les-Bains, France
- Ephrata, United States
