= Odenwald =

Low mountain range in Germany

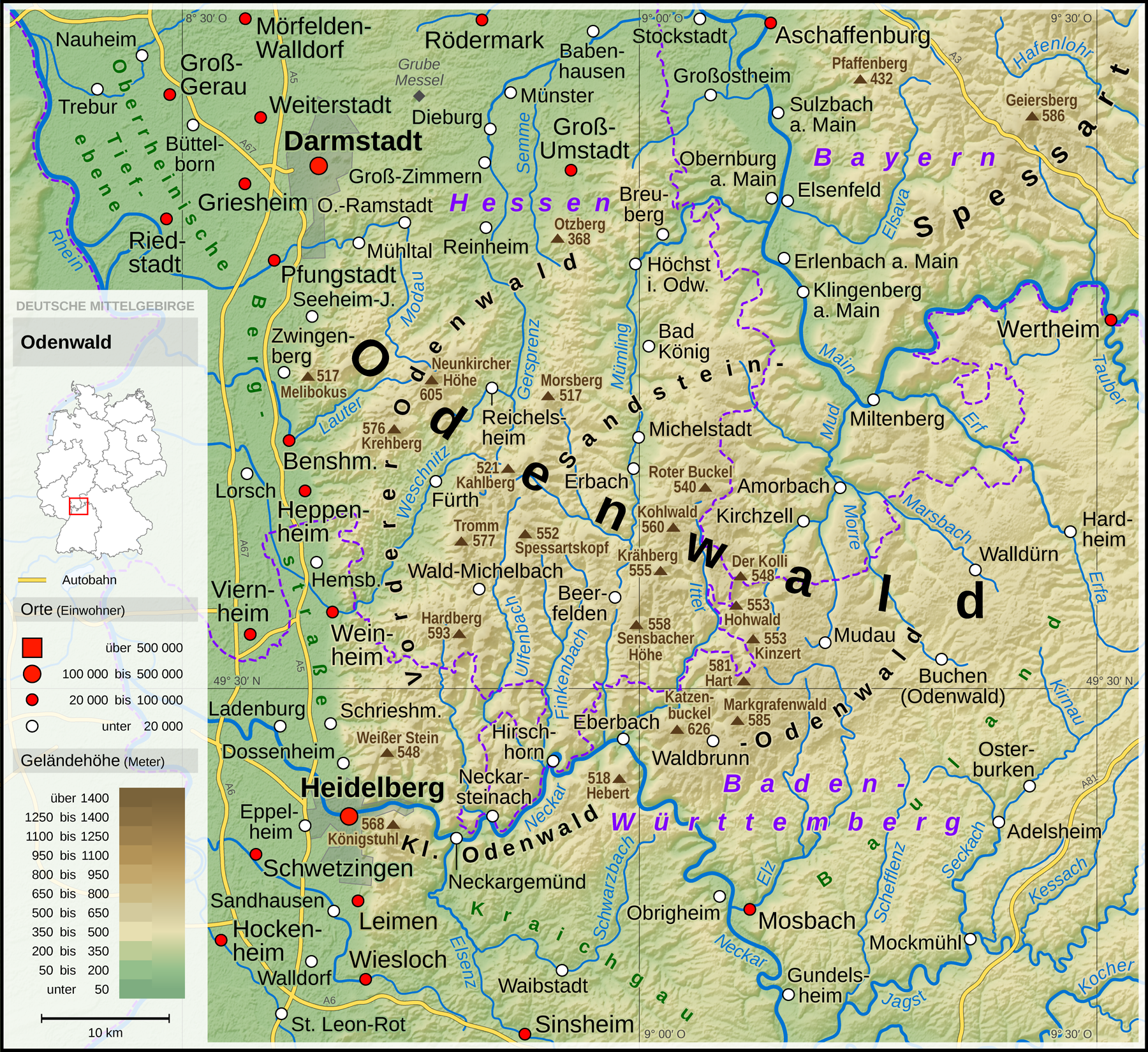
- Overview of the Odenwald

Highest point
- Peak: Katzenbuckel
- Elevation: 626 m (2,054 ft); NHN
- Coordinates: 49°28′15″N 9°2′28″E

Dimensions
- Area: 2,500 km^{2} (970 mi^{2})

Geography
- Location within Germany
- Country: Germany
- Region(s): Hesse, Bavaria, Baden-Württemberg
- Range coordinates: 49°35′N 9°1′E

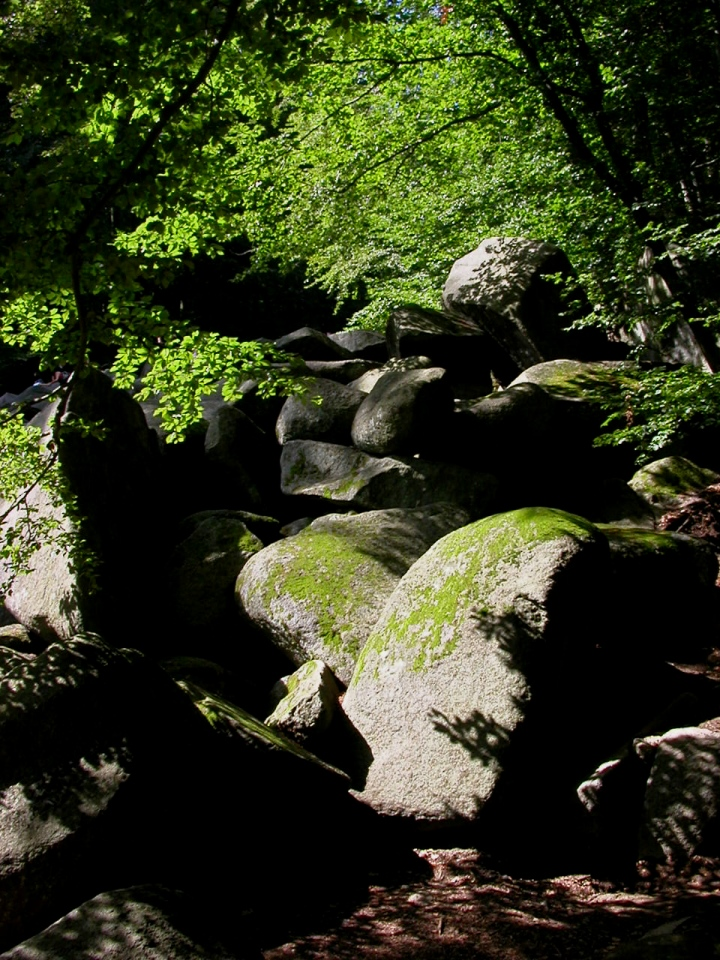
The Reichenbach felsenmeer in autumn

The Odenwald (German: [ˈoːdn̩valt]) is a low mountain range in the German states of Hesse, Bavaria and Baden-Württemberg.

== Location ==
The Odenwald is located between the Upper Rhine Plain with the Bergstraße and the Hessisches Ried (the northeastern section of the Rhine rift) to the west, the Main and the Bauland (a mostly unwooded area with good soils) to the east, the Hanau-Seligenstadt Basin – a subbasin of the Upper Rhine Rift Valley in the Rhine-Main Lowlands – to the north and the Kraichgau to the south. The part south of the Neckar valley is sometimes called the Kleiner Odenwald ("Little Odenwald"). The northern and western Odenwald belong to southern Hesse, with the south stretching into Baden. In the northeast, a small part lies in Lower Franconia in Bavaria.

== Geology ==
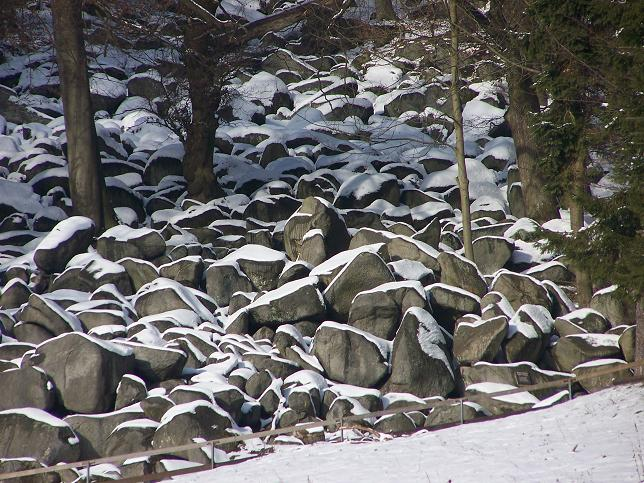
Felsenmeer near Reichenbach (Lautertal) in winter

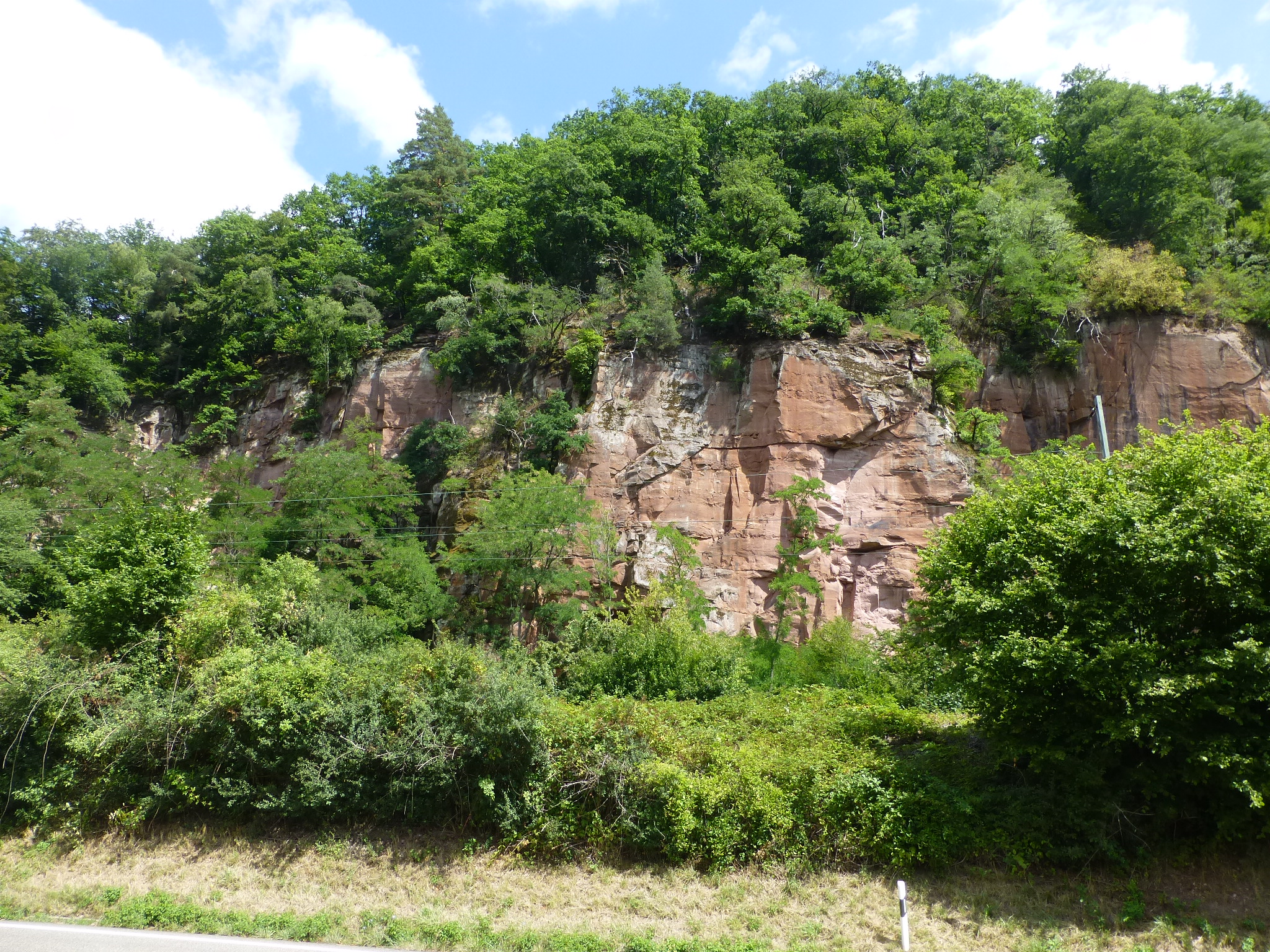
Characteristic sandstone formation near Eberbach

The basement of the Odenwald, along with other parts of the Central German Uplands, was formed by the collision of Africa’s and Europe's forerunner continents during the Variscan orogeny more than 300 million years ago.

In the Triassic, about 200 million years ago, the land sank to form the Germanic Basin in which sediments were deposited, leading to metre-thick layers of red sandstone. These were later covered over with layers of muschelkalk from a broad inland sea, then followed by sediments from the Late Triassic (or Keuper). The South German Cuesta Land thus formed.

The Odenwald was uplifted again, about 180 million years ago, and in places more than 100 m of the sedimentary layering was removed by erosion to expose the underlying basement. That basement can be seen in the western Odenwald where it is composed of a number of different rocks, among them gneiss, granite, diorite and gabbro (in the Frankenstein pluton). In the eastern Odenwald, the red sandstone is all that is left of the sedimentary mixture. Farther east in the Bauland, the muschelkalk deposits still overlie the Early Triassic layers. In the south, near Heidelberg, there is still Zechstein under the Early Triassic deposits.

Roughly 50 to 60 million years ago, volcanoes formed along the great geological faults. Still bearing witness to this time are the Otzberg, the Daumberg and the Katzenbuckel, all extinct volcanoes in the Odenwald. Furthermore, volcanism with acidic rocks has left a legacy of rhyolites near Dossenheim. The Otzberg cataclasite zone as a major tectonic suture separates the two main units of the crystalline basement of the Odenwald.

At roughly the same time, the Central European plate began to tear apart so that the Upper Rhine Rift developed. Even as the Upper Rhine Rift valley still sinks today by just under a millimetre each year, the Odenwald, relatively to that, was uplifted to the height it has today. Along the faults, the small rivers Gersprenz and Weschnitz have, in part, carved their courses.

The Upper Rhine Rift is part of a fracture zone reaching from the Mediterranean Sea to Norway. Right on the edge of the Odenwald, it is roughly 2 500 m deep, but has been filled in to its current height by river and sea sediment, for until about 20 million years ago, the North Sea reached far inland, across the Wetterau Depression into the Rhine Valley.

=== Geological maps ===
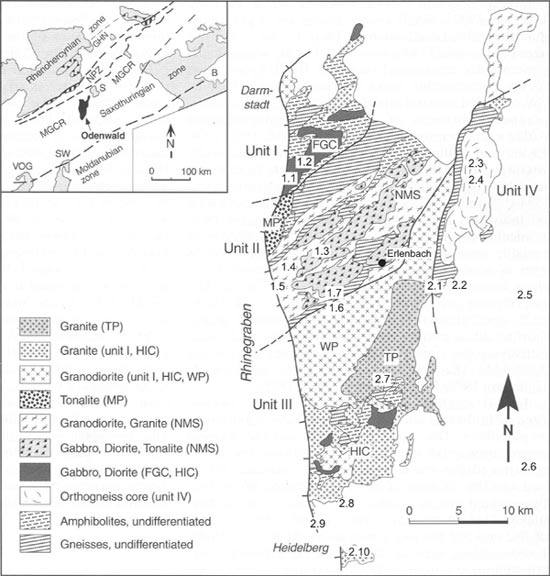
Granite-Gneiss-Odenwald (Altherr, 1999)

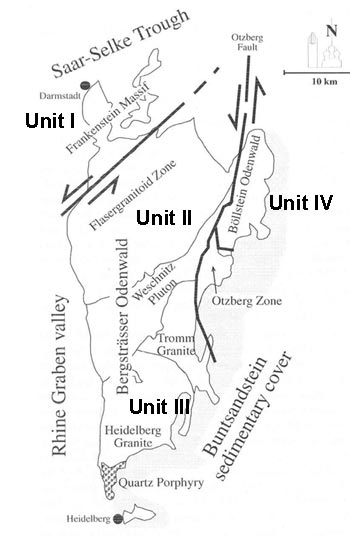
Granite-Gneiss-Odenwald (Stein, 2001)

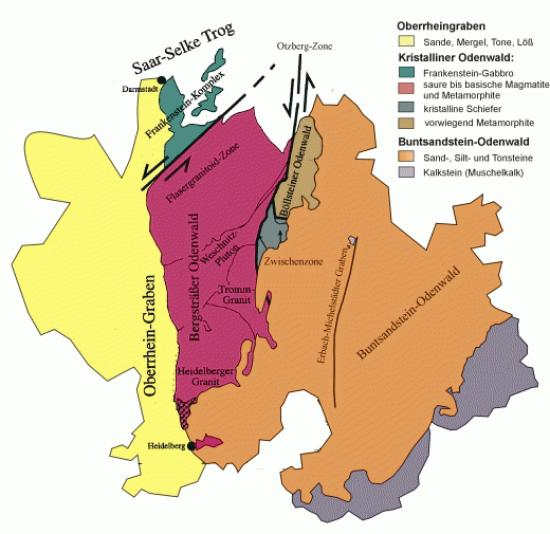
Granite-Gneiss- and Redsandstone-Odenwald (Stein, 2001 + Weber, Geo-Naturpark)

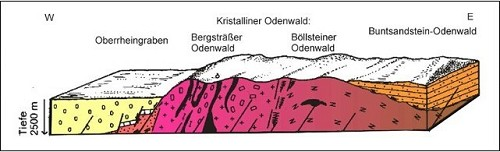
Geological profile (from left): Rheinplane, Granite-Odenwald, Gneiss-Odenwald, Redsandstone-Odenwald (Geo-Naturpark)

== History ==
About 2500 BC, there is evidence that the Linear Pottery culture settled along the northern (Gersprenz) and southern (Neckar valley) edges of the Odenwald. About 400 BC, Celts (Gauls) settled throughout southern Germany. Almost all of the Odenwald was covered then with virgin forest, and the outer edges were not settled. Germanic peoples drove the Celts westwards across the Rhine to what is now France.

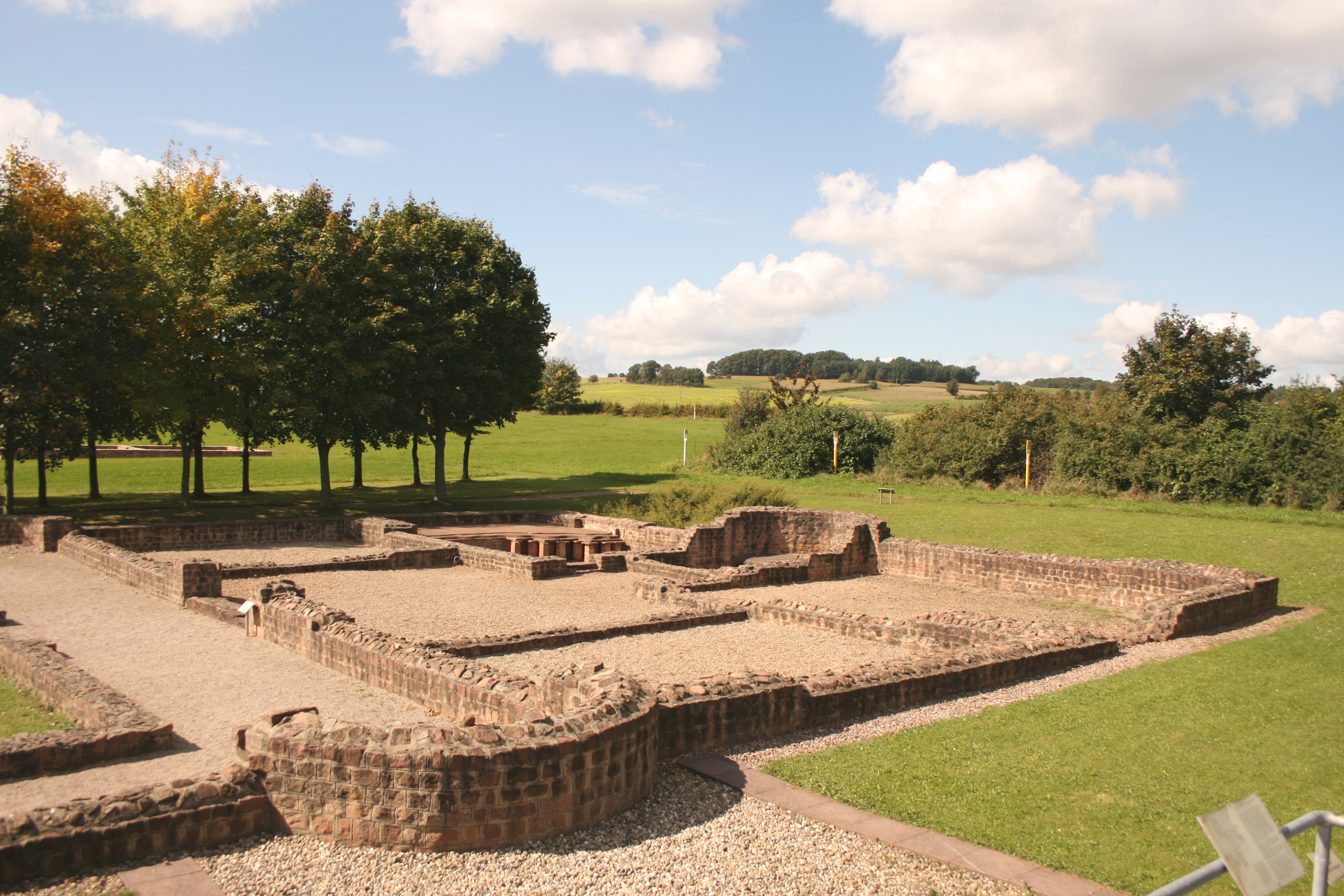
Roman manor house Villa Haselburg near Höchst (Mümling)

About AD 100, the older Odenwald line of the Neckar-Odenwald Limes was built under Roman Emperor Trajan (98-117). This stretch of the Empire's border ran from Fort Wimpfen in the Valley (Kastell Wimpfen im Tal) northwards by way of the Forts of Neckarburken, the lesser forts of Trienz and Robern near Fahrenbach, Fort Oberscheidental, Fort Schloßau, Fort Hesselbach, Fort Würzberg, Fort Eulbach, Fort Hainhaus and Fort Hesselbach to Fort Wörth on the Main. Parts of the Odenwald now lay in Roman-ruled Germania Superior.

About 159, the Limes was shifted about 30 kilometres (19 miles) eastwards to the Miltenberg–Walldürn–Buchen-Osterburken line. In 260, Roman hegemony fell. The Alamanni were also thrusting into the Odenwald and settling the land between the Main and Neckar, after whom came the Franks. In the 5th century, the Franks, under Clovis I, divided the land up into districts.

In the 7th and 8th centuries came Christianization by Irish-Scottish and Anglo-Saxon monks (Pirmin, Boniface). On the muschelkalk lands of today's Bauland, which favoured agriculture, a broad mesh of settlements arose. The parts of the Odenwald farther in from the rivers, though, with their scant New Red Sandstone soils remained uninhabited. Four Benedictine monasteries were assigned the job of opening the empty woods up by the central Frankish power (Carolingian), Lorsch Abbey from the west, Fulda Monastery from the east and Mosbach Monastery from the south. Amorbach Monastery had the greatest importance for ecclesiastical, cultural and economic development in the eastern Odenwald.

In the 9th century in the southeastern Odenwald near the now more thickly settled Bauland, settlements were established. The muschelkalk-new red sandstone mineral boundary was crossed.

== Name ==
The following are some theories about the origin of the name Odenwald:

1. Some have claimed that the toponym comes from Odins Wald (Odin’s Woods). The main problem here is that the god Wodanaz (known in Norse as Odin) was worshipped in southern Germany under the name Wotan (in Old High German Uuodan; compare Merseburg Incantations).
2. A further theory holds that there is a link between the name Odenwald and the Roman administrative unit Civitas Auderiensium, which among other things included the range's northern reaches and might have been named after a tribe called the Auderienses.
3. There could be some kinship with the word öde, not in the currently understood meaning in German of desert, but rather in the meaning thinly settled.
4. Einhard, the biographer of Charlemagne used the term Odanwald. Therefore, the renowned historian Karl Christ establishes a connection to the Old High German (ahd.) expression odan (=to enfeoff) and presumes, that the Odenwald was a hunting ground, which the King of the Franks Dagobert I. enfeoffed in 628 the Bishopric of Worms.
5. An eminent geographer of the 16th century, Sebastian Münster, proposed a tribal chief as the name giver (Odtonwald, 821, = Odo's Woods). However, it is not proven whether there actually was a count or duke called Odo (Otto). Finally, Münster's researches do not lead to any result.

Linguists who research phonetic changes and the sound shifts reject theories no. 1 to 3 and prefer 4 or 5; some historians favor no. 2.

== Legends and mythology ==
The numerous Odenwald folk legends are mostly connected with historic geographic sites (castle, town, rock, road and so on) They relate:

- mysterious actions and appearances of ghosts in a castle (for example the two Bergstraße-ruins Auerbach - castle and Windeck) or in a nightscape respectively in a cottage: The Höhmann near Bensheim, the White Lady of Mossau, the Schlurcher close by Erbach, the Man without head near Heppenheim, the Goast-nuns of monastery Steinbach.
- the stories of knights and their ladies: Konrad and Ann-Els von Tannenberg, Edelmut von Ehrenberg and Minna von Horneck at the Minneburg, Georg von Frankenstein and Annemariechen, Hans von Rodenstein and Maria von Hochberg.
- the apparitions of the devil: Teufelspfad (pathway of the devil) to the Felsberg, Teufelsstein (rock of the devil) in Gorxheimertal, Opferstein (altar stone) on the top of the Juhöhe.
- or the apparitions of a witch: for example in the shape of a pig in Bensheim

In some stories the local aspect firstly is connected with monsters (knight Georg fights against the man-eating lindworm near Frankenstein-castle) and creatures of nature with magic potency (a water spirit changed into a fox near Niedernhausen, the merwoman in the Meerwiese of Waldürn).

Secondly the local legend is connected with the genre of the historic saga: a historic person or an original is portrayed anecdotally (the count of Erbach and Luther, resp. the Raubacher Joggel, landgrave Ludwig VIII: of Hesse-Darmstadt, robber Hölzerlips).

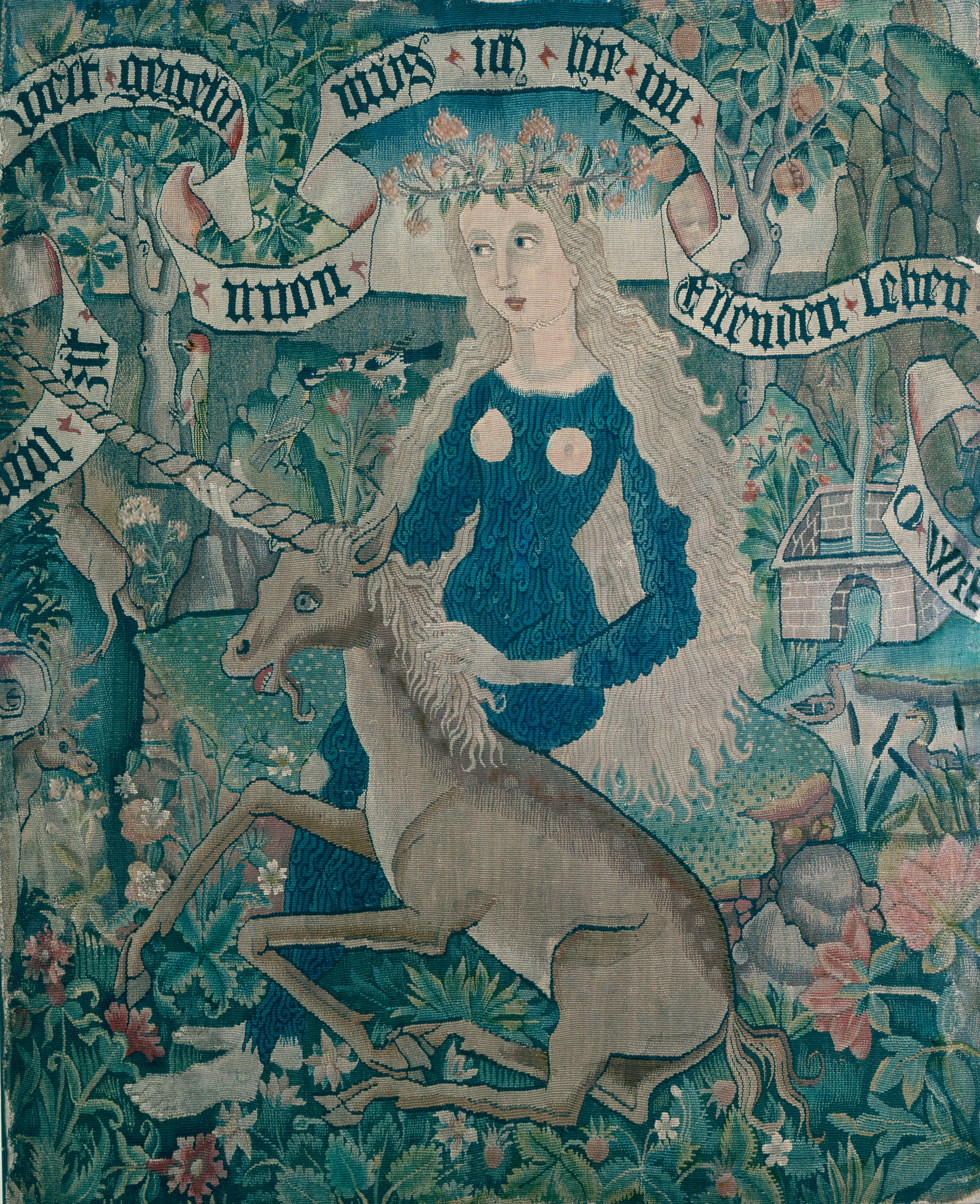
Wild Woman (Wildweibchen) with a unicorn (Straßburg around 1500)

Thirdly a local tale explains an etiological or original myth (aetiological saga). For example, there is explained:

- why a name is given: many Wildweibchensteine (Wild Woman-Rocks) in the Odenwald, Teufelsstein (stone of the devil), Teufelspfad (path of the devil), Opfersteine (altar stone) and Hundsköpfe (dogheads) on top of the Juhöhe, Hölzerlips-stone, Schimmeldewoog for the village Schönmattenwag (→Folk etymology) or the phrase "hinnerum wie die Fraa vun Bensem",
- why a natural phenomena, for example a typical landscape, was formed: the saga creates a mythic history for the places of the felsenmeer and the Hohenstein near Reichenbach (because giants stoned each other) or the Herrgottsfelsen (Godrock) near Darmstadt (act of revenge by the devil for finessing),
- why a castle (Minneburg) was built at a special place (Minneberg at the Neckar) and was so named hereafter,
- why a mysterious stone carving was inset in a castle-wall: figure of a dog at the portal of the Minneburg near Neckargerach, the Blecker at the town gate of Buchen, the Breilecker above the door of Breuberg-castle.

Beside these legends there are two famous and well-known Odenwaldsagas:

In the Nibelungenlied (see also Nibelung) the dragon slayer Siegfried, on a hunting trip (instead of a failed campaign) leading from the Burgundian city of Worms into the Odenwald, is murdered by Hagen of Tronje. Since no exact spot for this deed has been handed down, countless communities, especially in the Hessian Odenwald are squabbling over the right to call themselves "Siegfried's Murder Site", for example a spring near Gras-Ellenbach (Siegfriedsbrunnen), Mossautal-Hüttenthal Lindelbrunnen) or Heppenheim (Siegfriedbrunnen).

The ruins of Rodenstein (below-mentioned) and Schnellerts near Fränkisch-Crumbach are the setting of an Odenwald ghost story: during the night the knight Rodenstein (the Rodensteiner) flies with a berserker-cornet through the air to prophesy the beginning of a war (Wild Hunt motif).

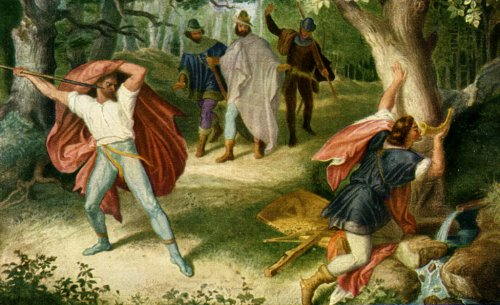
"Siegfried's Death" (Julius Schnorr von Carolsfeld, 1847): Hagen murdered Siegfried by a spring in the Odenwald.

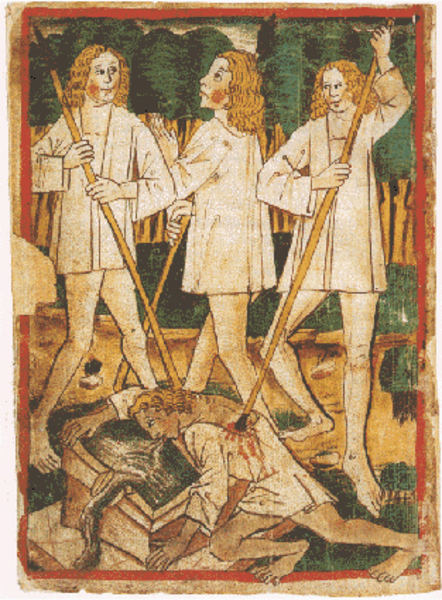
Picture of Siegfrieds assassination in the Nibelungenlied-manuscript k (1480–90)

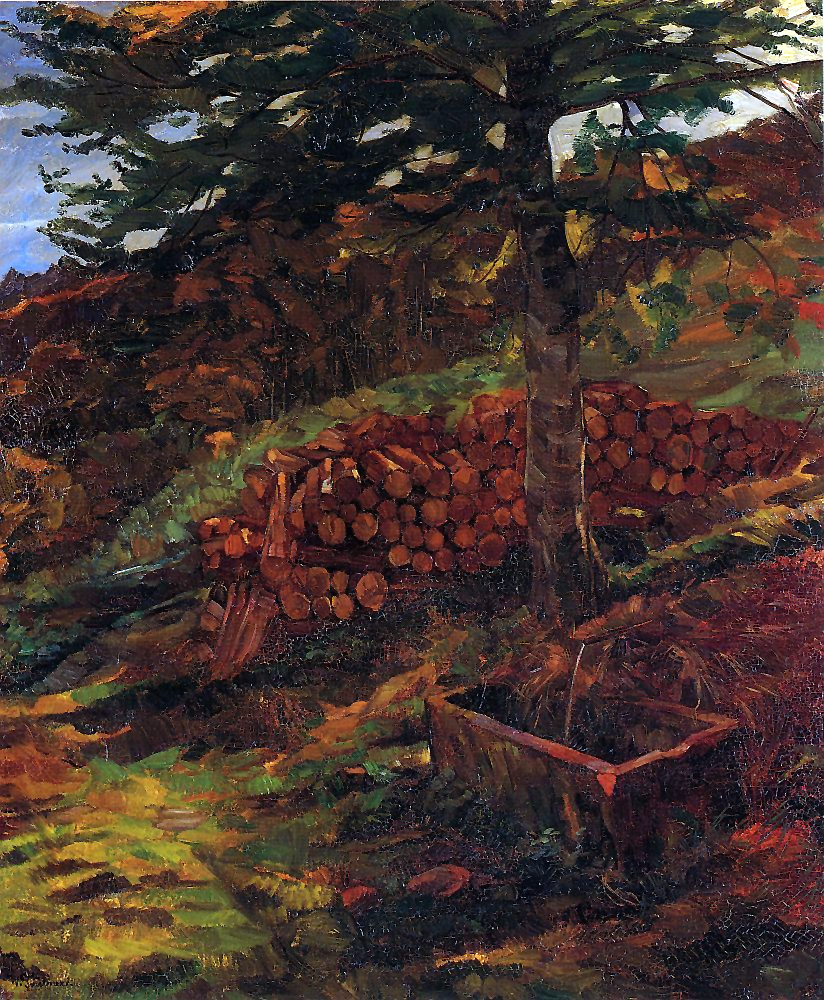
Siegfriedbrunnen by Wilhelm Trübner. In the legend there is no exact description in respect of the hunting trip.

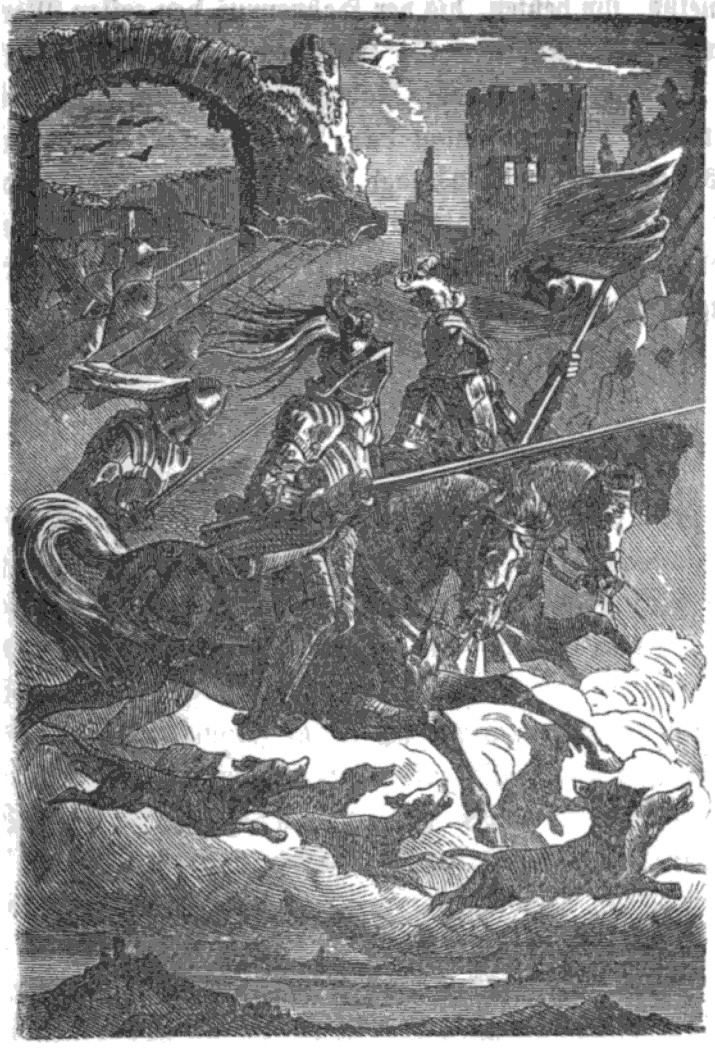
Rodenstein Castle is the scene of the Rodensteiner ghost legend (19th-century picture).

== Topography ==
=== Mountains ===
==== Over 600 m ====
- Katzenbuckel (626 m; lookout tower), Neckar-Odenwald-Kreis, Baden-Württemberg
- Neunkircher Höhe (605 m; Kaiser Tower), Bergstraße district, Hesse
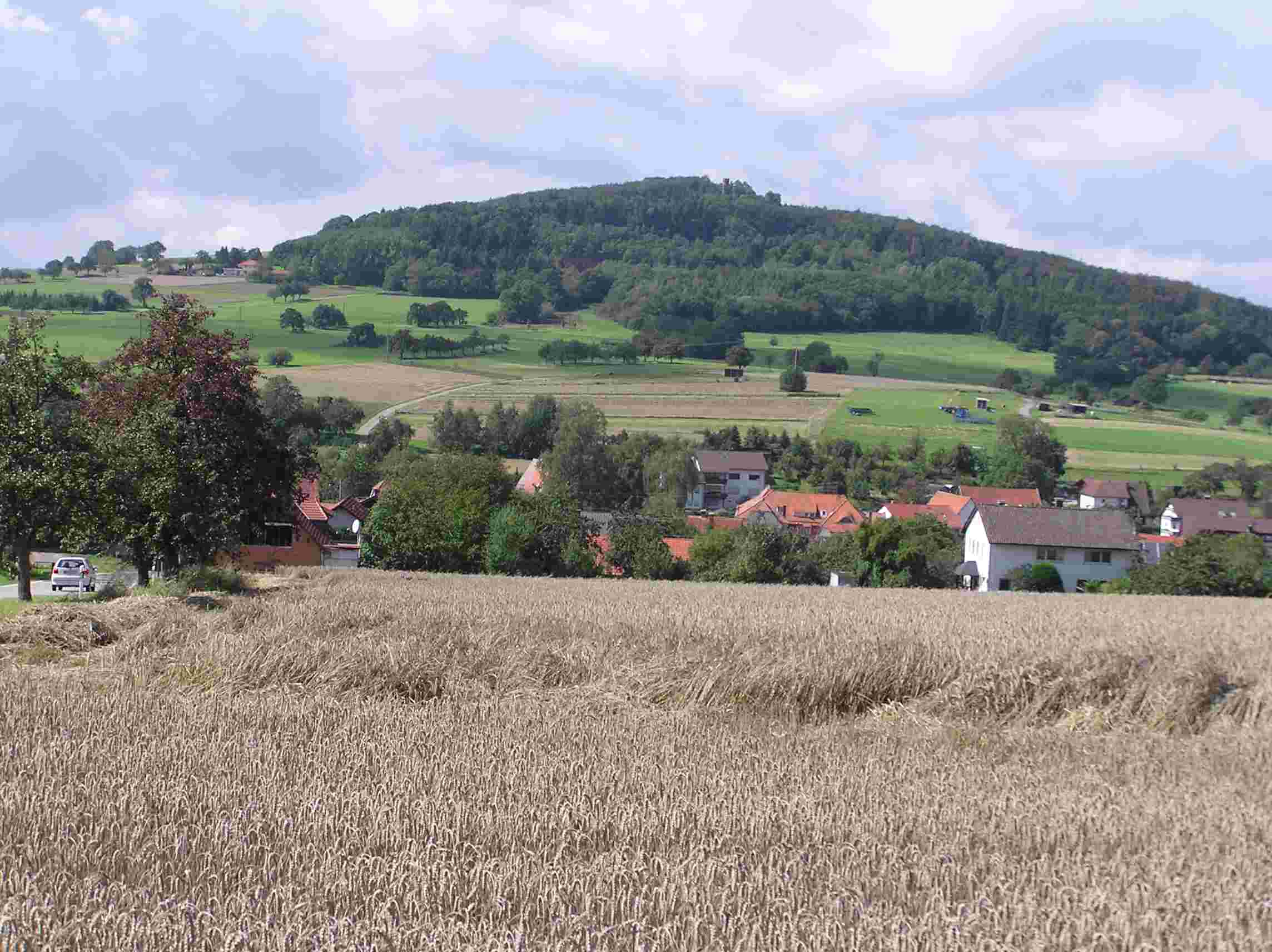
The Crystal Teaching Path around the Katzenbuckel starts near the old volcanic quarry (below-mentioned).

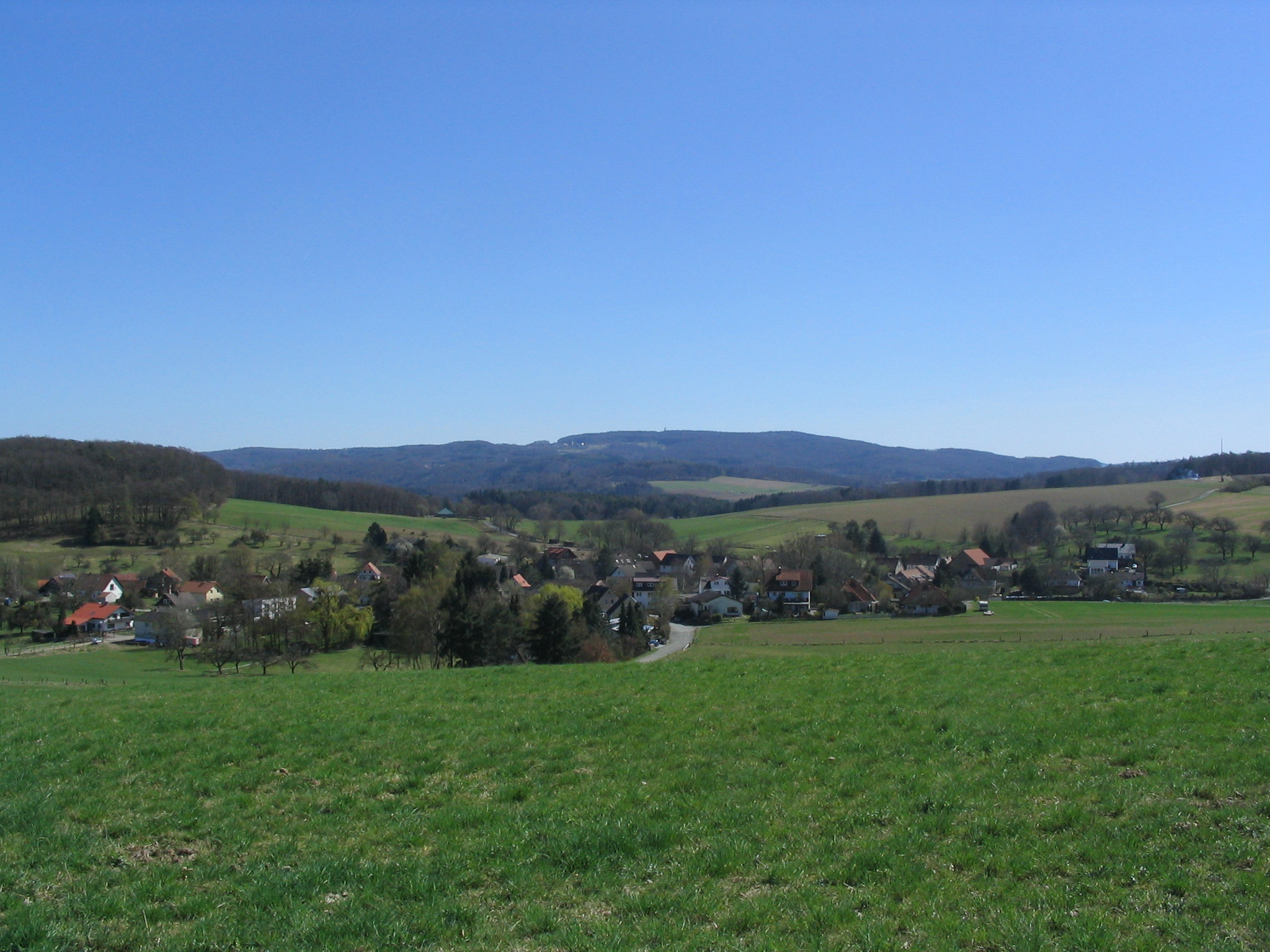
Neutsch with a view to Neunkirchen and the Neunkircher Höhe

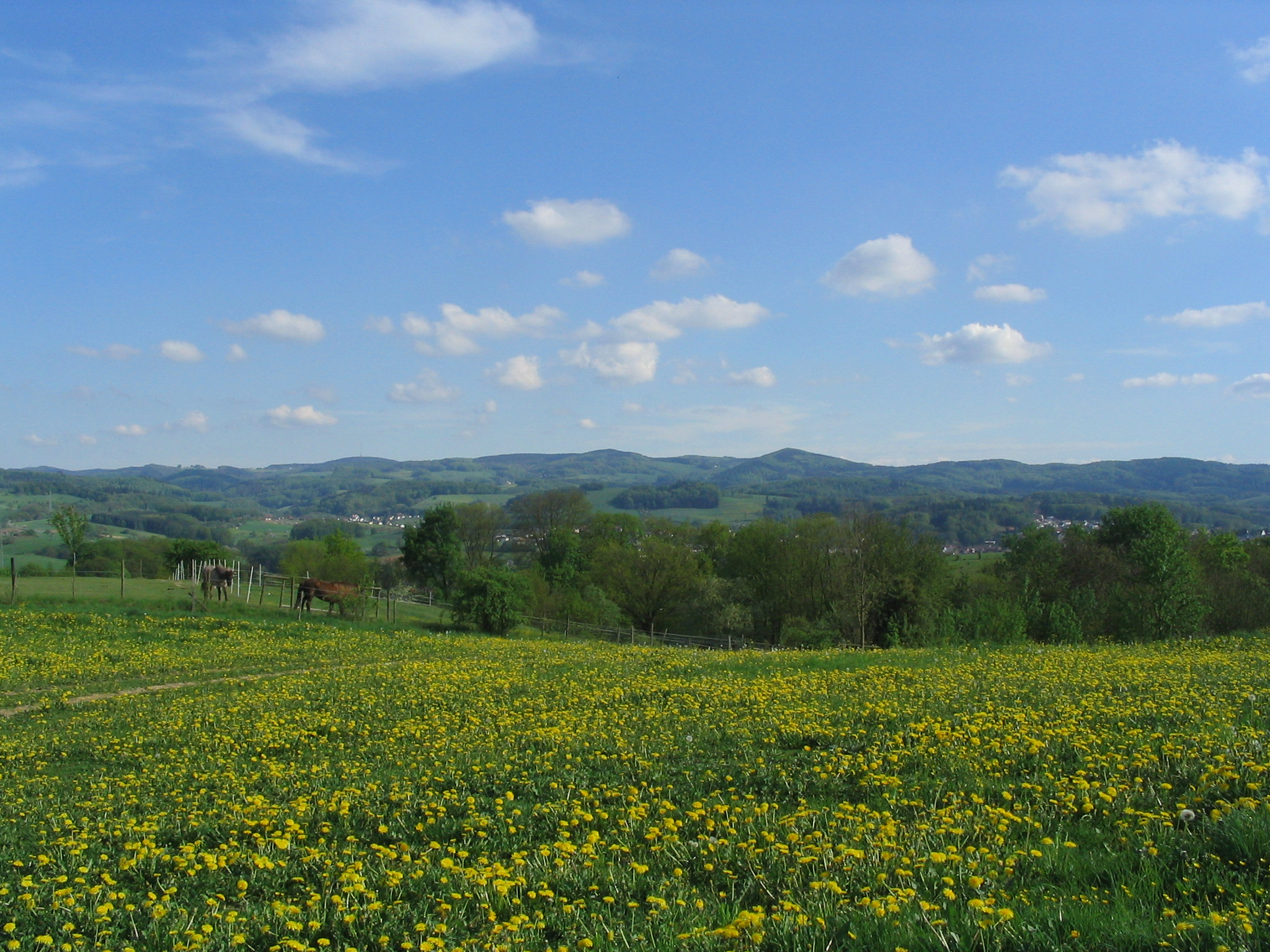
View from Weschnitz- Valley to the mountains Hardberg (with transmitter), Götzenstein, Kisselbusch (from left)

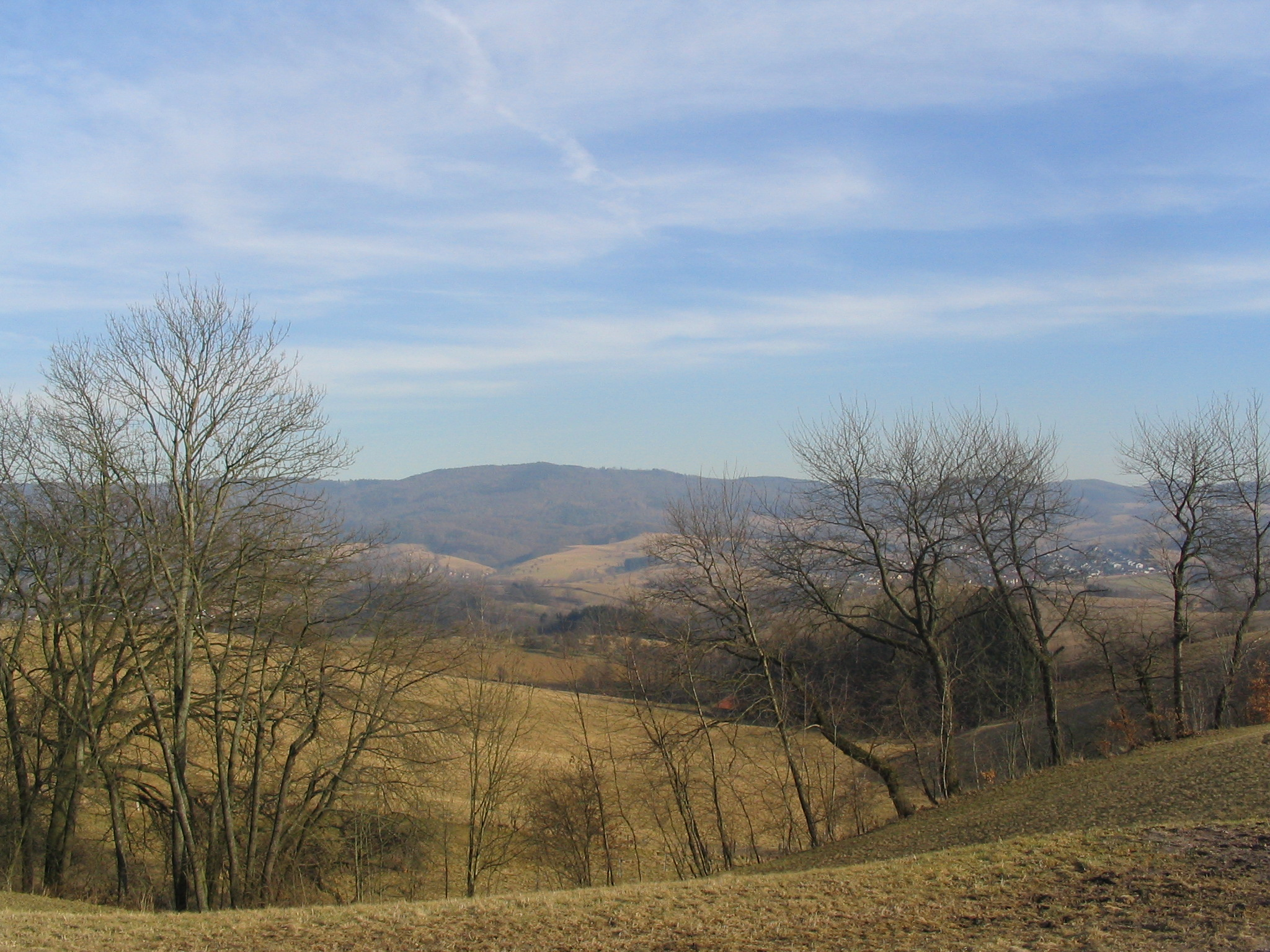
Weschnitz- Valley with a view to Tromm-mountain range

==== Over 450 m ====
- Hardberg (593 m), Bergstraße district, Hesse
- Stiefelhöhe (584 m), Hesse/Baden-Württemberg border
- Tromm (577 m; lookout tower), Bergstraße district, Hesse
- Krehberg (576 m; with Krehberg transmitter), Bergstraße district, Hesse
- Königstuhl (567.8 m; observatory, funicular railway), Heidelberg, Baden-Württemberg
- Krähberg (555 m), Odenwaldkreis, Hesse
- Kinzert (554 m), Neckar-Odenwald-Kreis, Baden-Württemberg
- Weißer Stein (550 m; lookout tower), Rhein-Neckar-Kreis, Baden-Württemberg
- Hohe Warte (548 m), Rhein-Neckar-Kreis, Baden-Württemberg
- Spessartskopf (547 m), Bergstraße district, Hesse
- Falkenberg (546 m), Odenwaldkreis, Hesse
- Waldskopf (538 m), Gorxheimertal-Trösel, Bergstraße district, Hesse
- Das Buch (535.30 m; near Lindenfels), Bergstraße district, Hesse
- Wagenberg (535 m), Bergstraße district, Hesse
- Eichelberg (526 m; lookout tower), Rhein-Neckar-Kreis, Baden-Württemberg
- Götzenstein (522 m), Bergstraße district, Hesse
- Melibokus („Malschen“) (517.40 m), Bergstraße district, Hesse
- Morsberg (517 m), Odenwaldkreis, Hesse
- Felsberg (514 m; with Felsenmeer), Bergstraße district, Hesse
- Knodener Kopf (511.20 m), Bergstraße district, Hesse
- Wannenberg (482 m), Miltenberg district, Bavaria
- Daumberg (462 m), Gorxheimertal-Trösel, Bergstraße district, Hesse
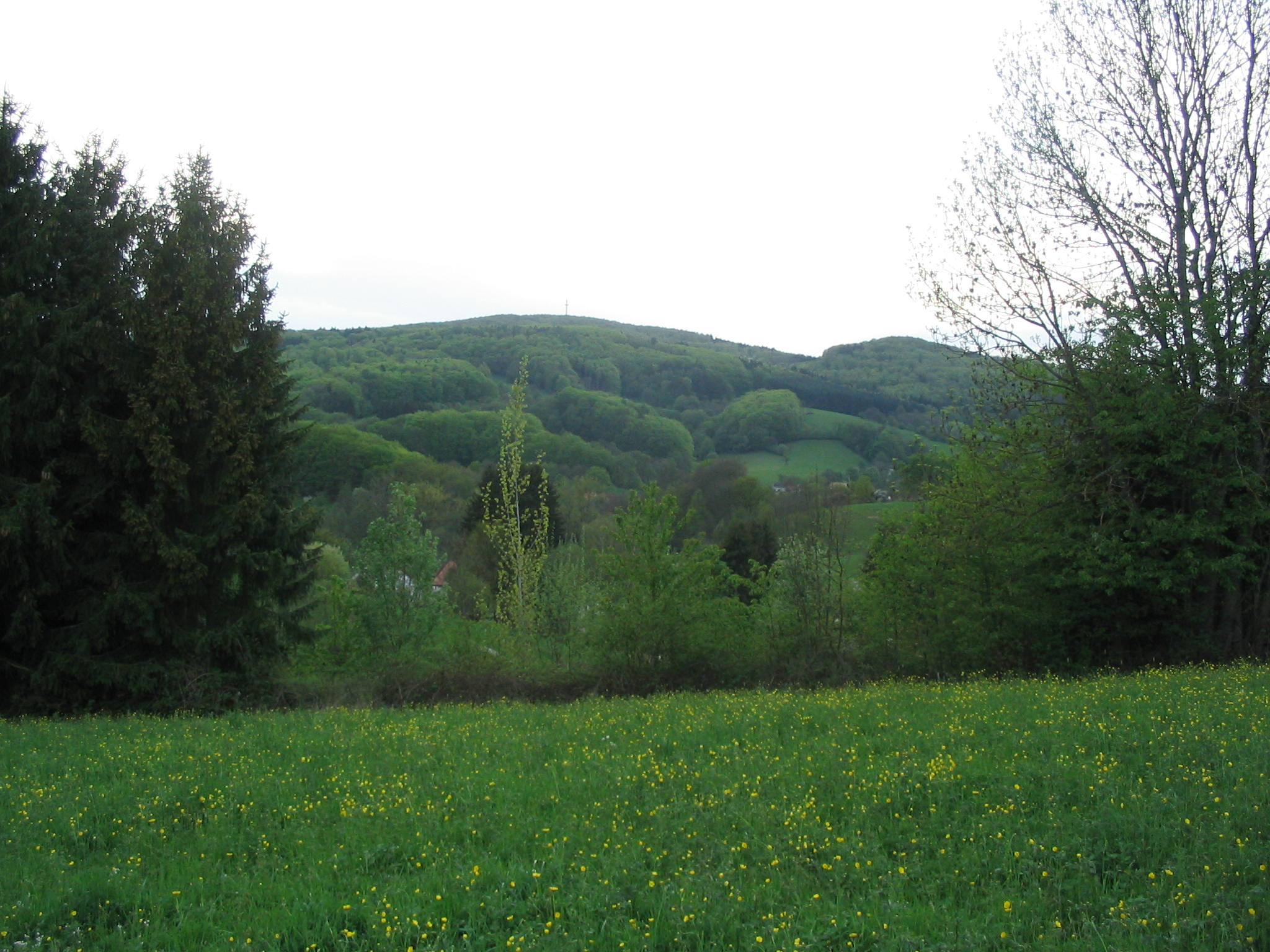
Overlooking the Krehberg (view from Lindenfels)

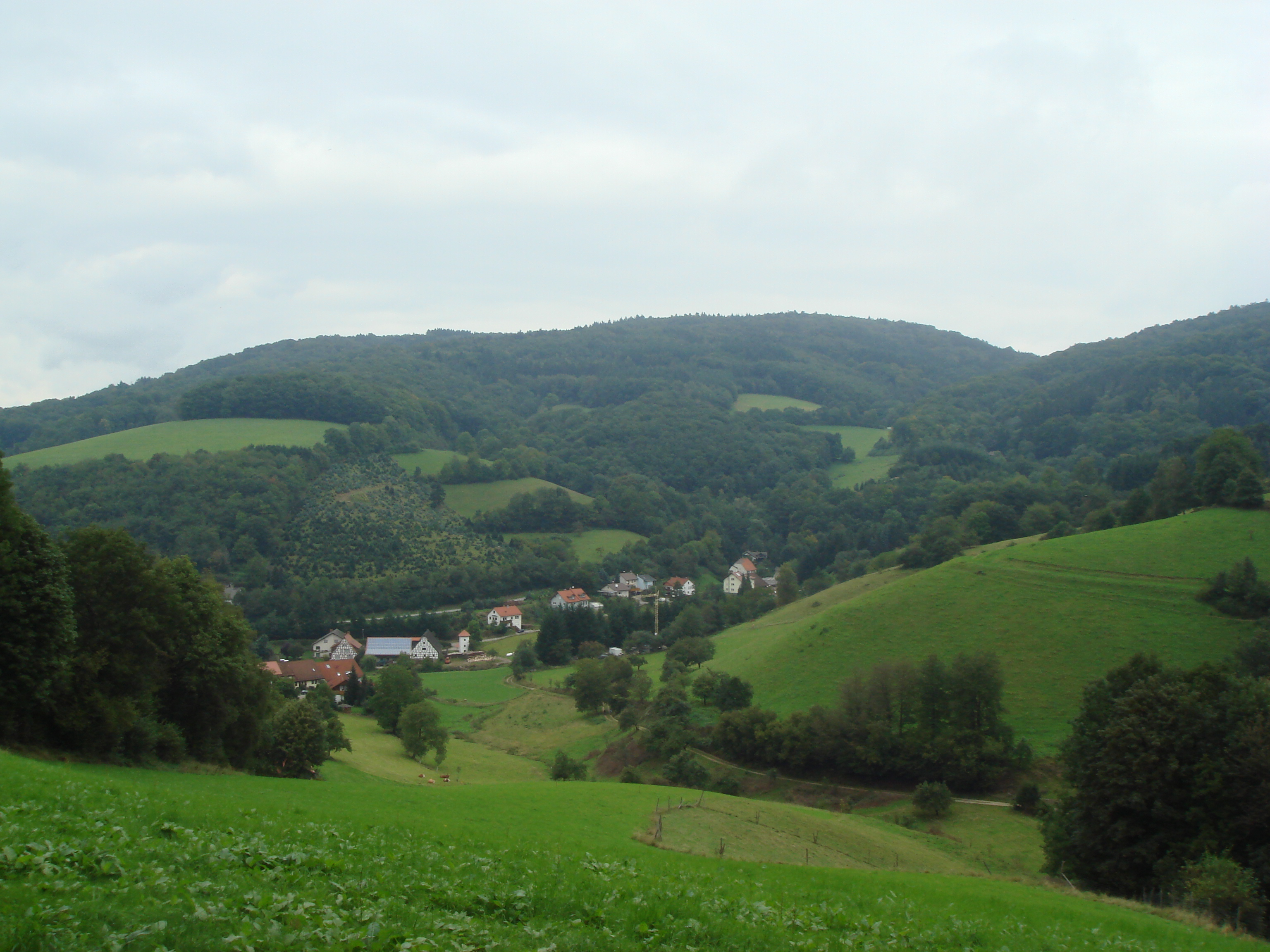
The Waldskopf in the Gorxheim valley

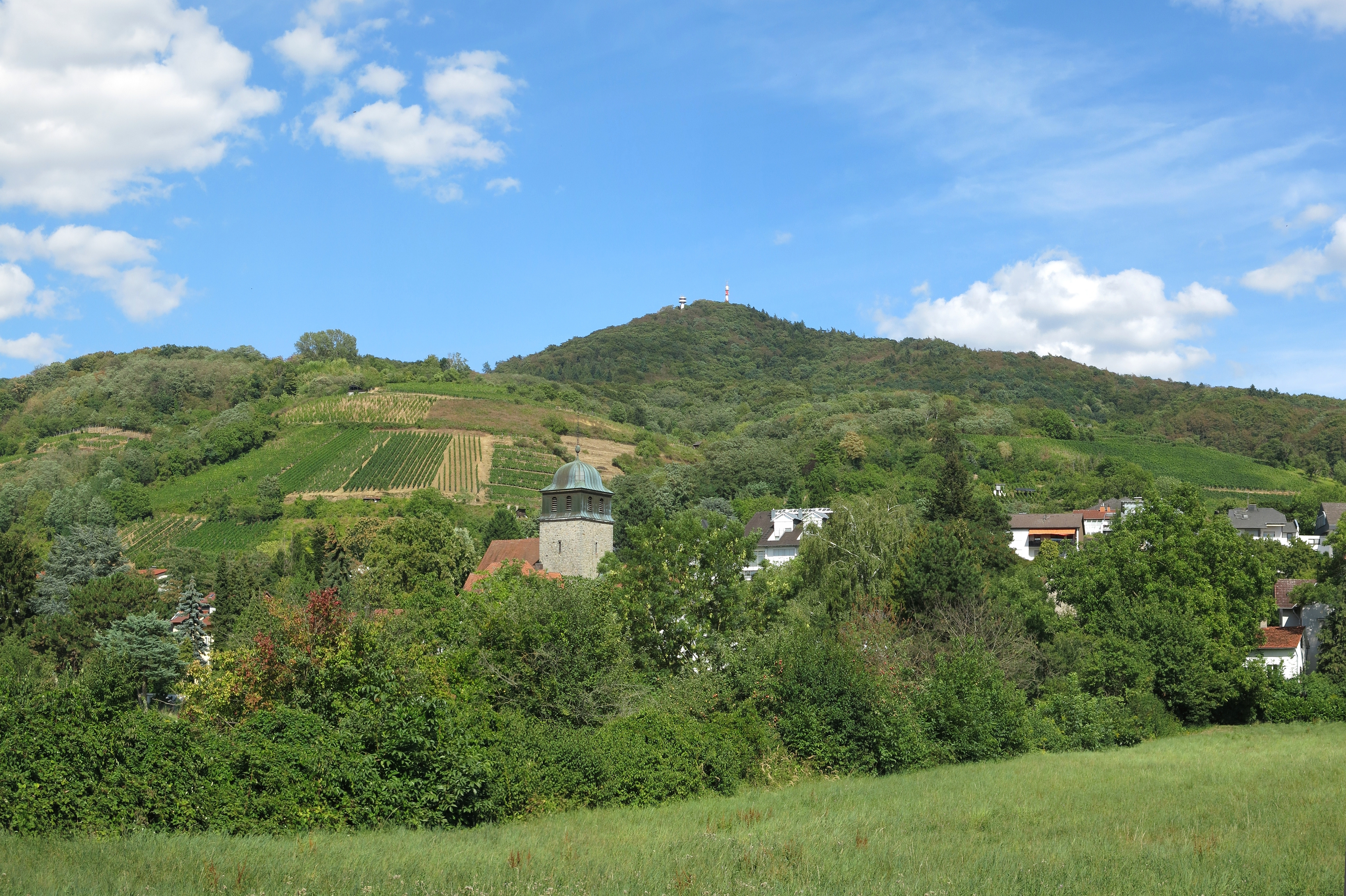
The Melibokus near Zwingenberg

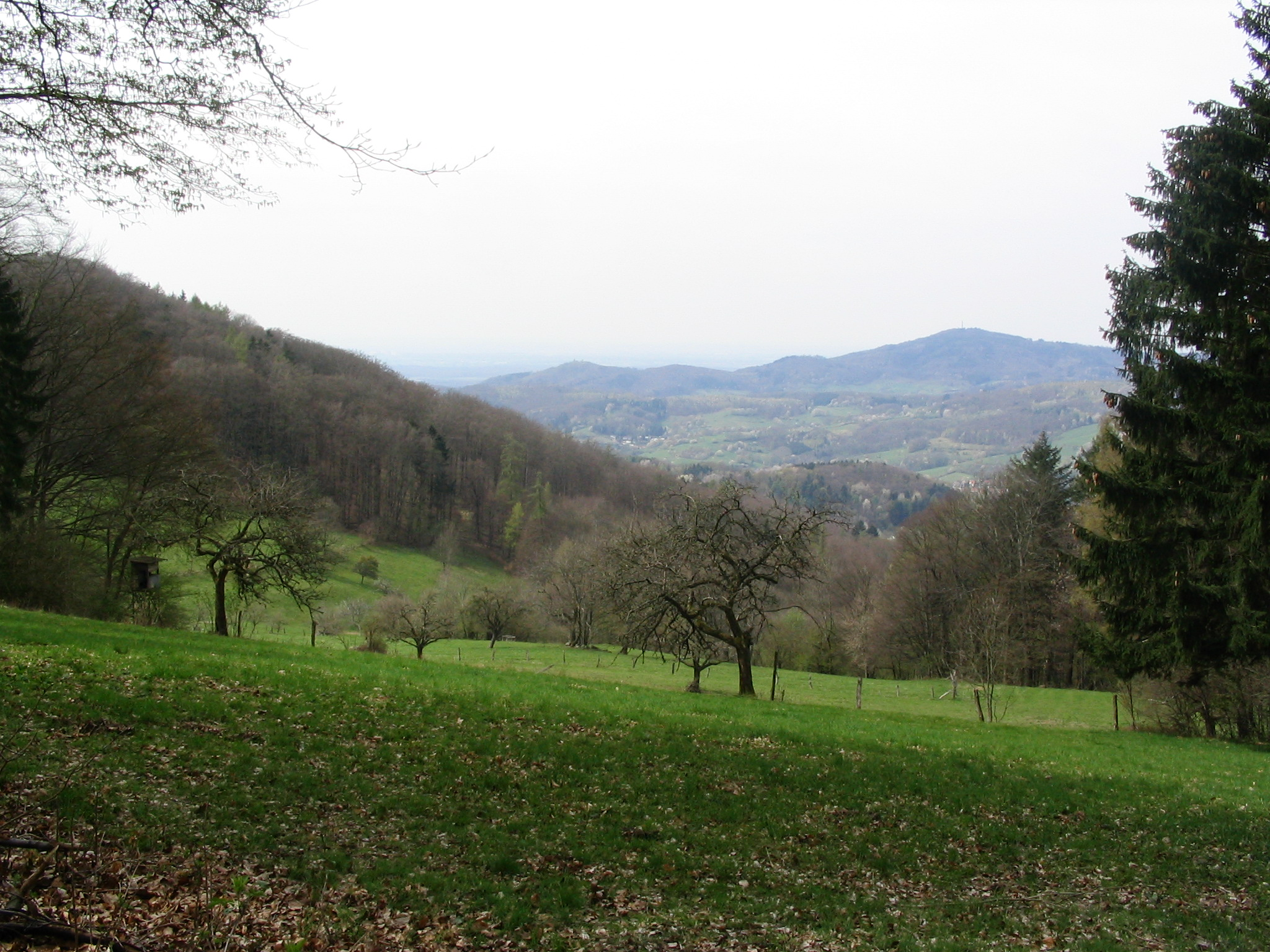
With a view from the Lauter- Valley (Hohenstein) to the Melibokus (right) and the Auerbach Castle (background, in the middle)

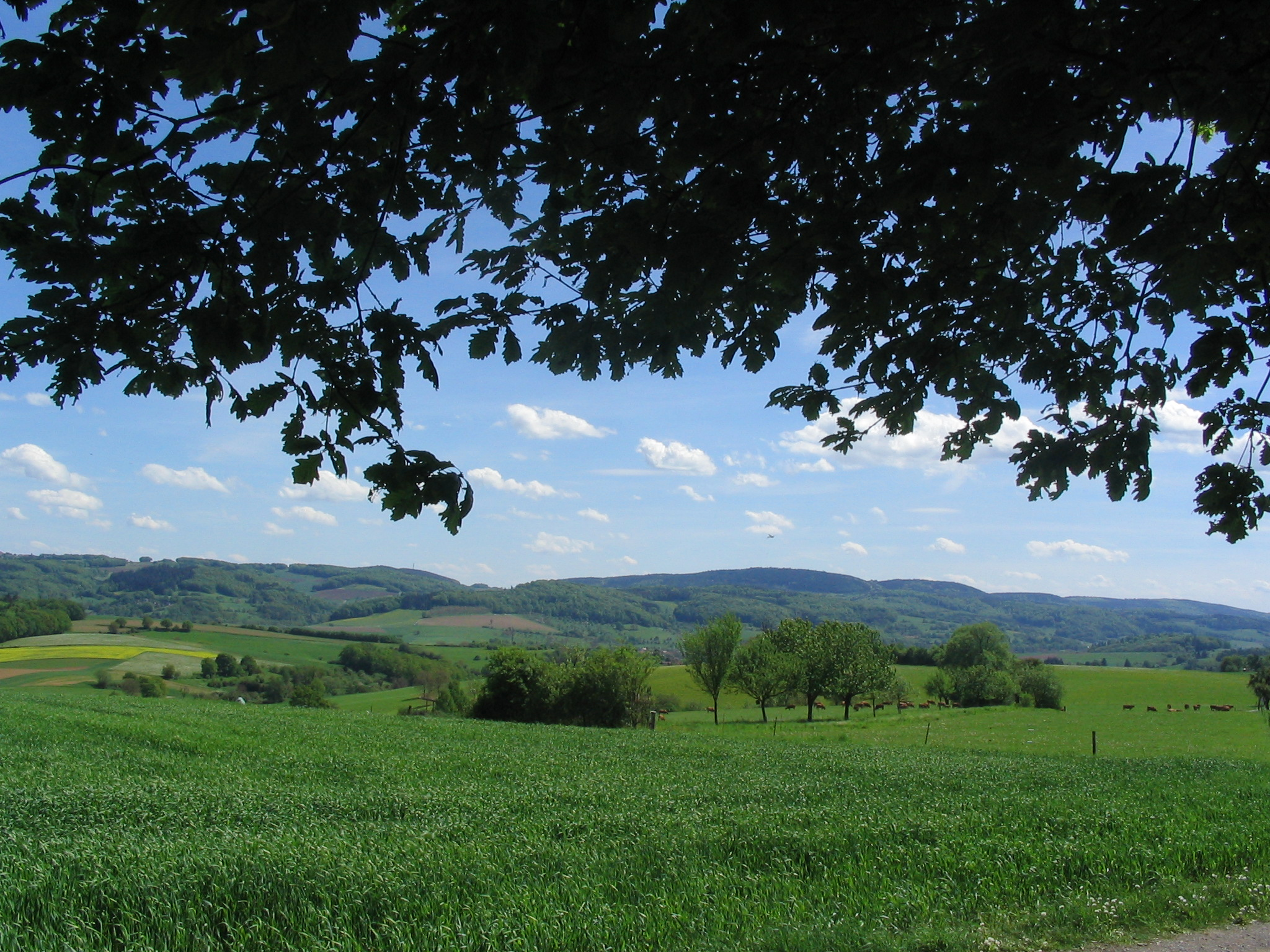
The Gesprenz-Valley gneiss-sandstone-mountain range: Böllsteiner Höhe on the left, Morsberg in the middle

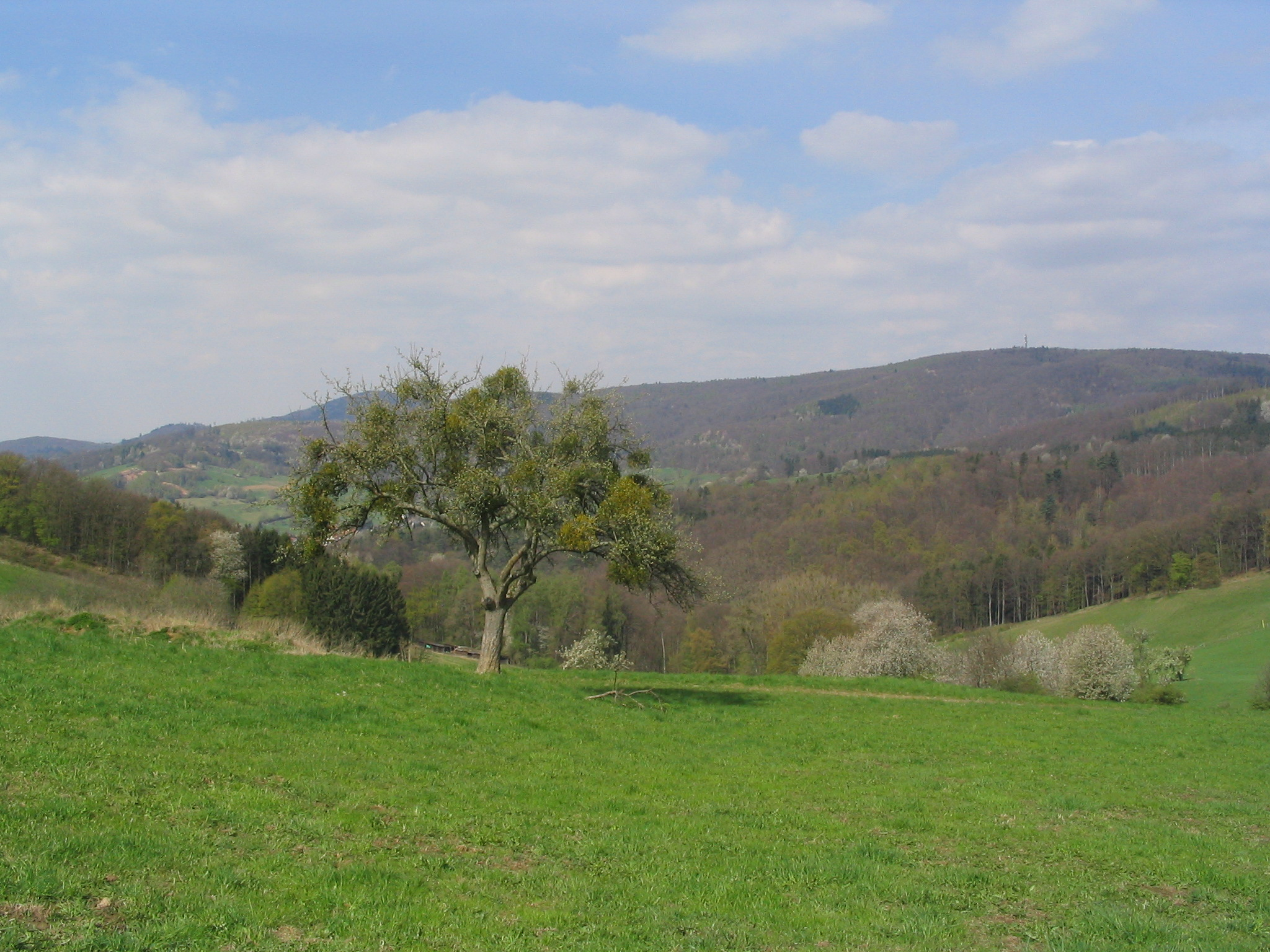
The Felsberg (with transmitter, view from the Lauter-Valley), Auerbach-Castle and Melibokus on the left

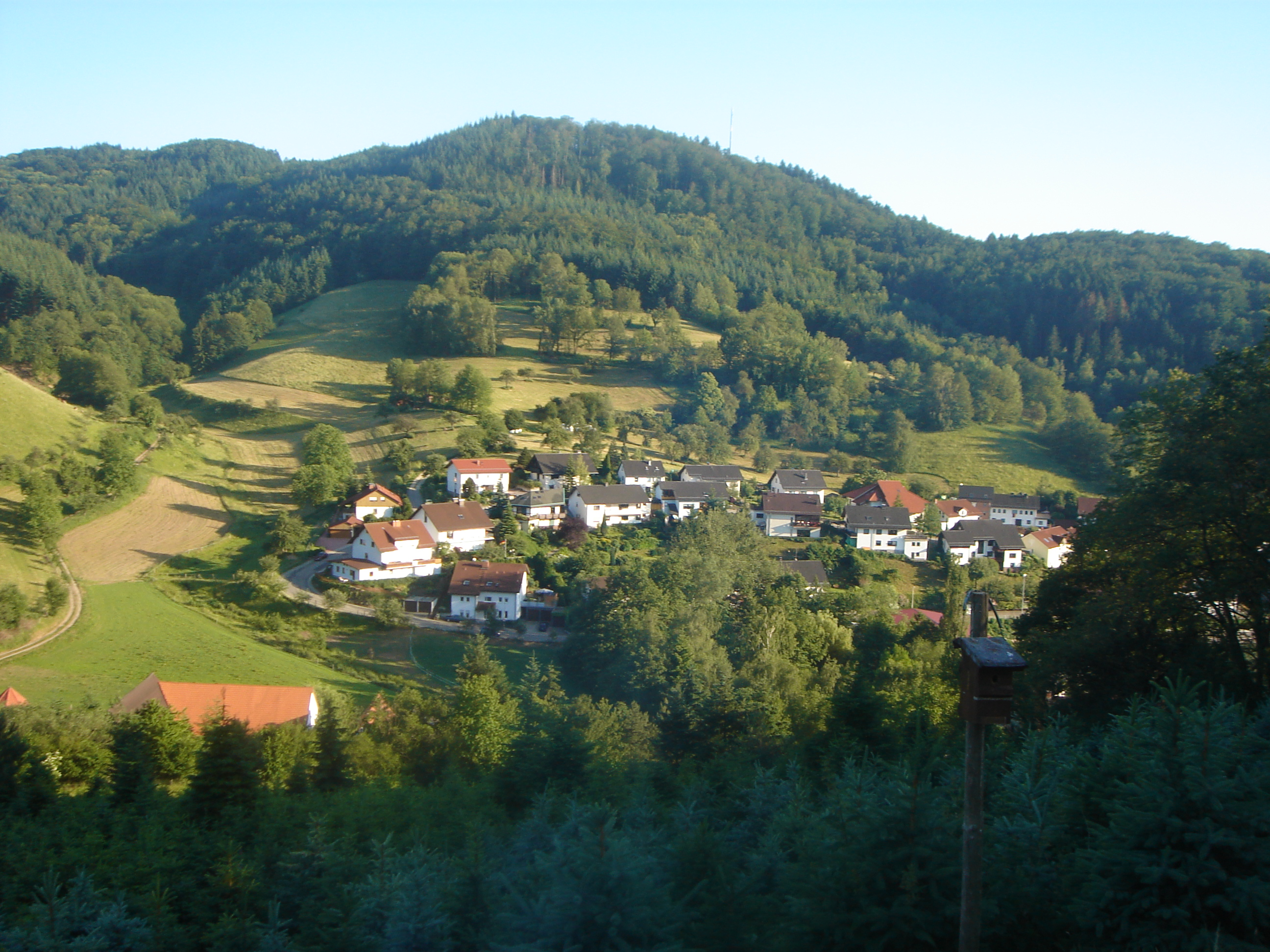
The Daumberg in the Gorxheim valley

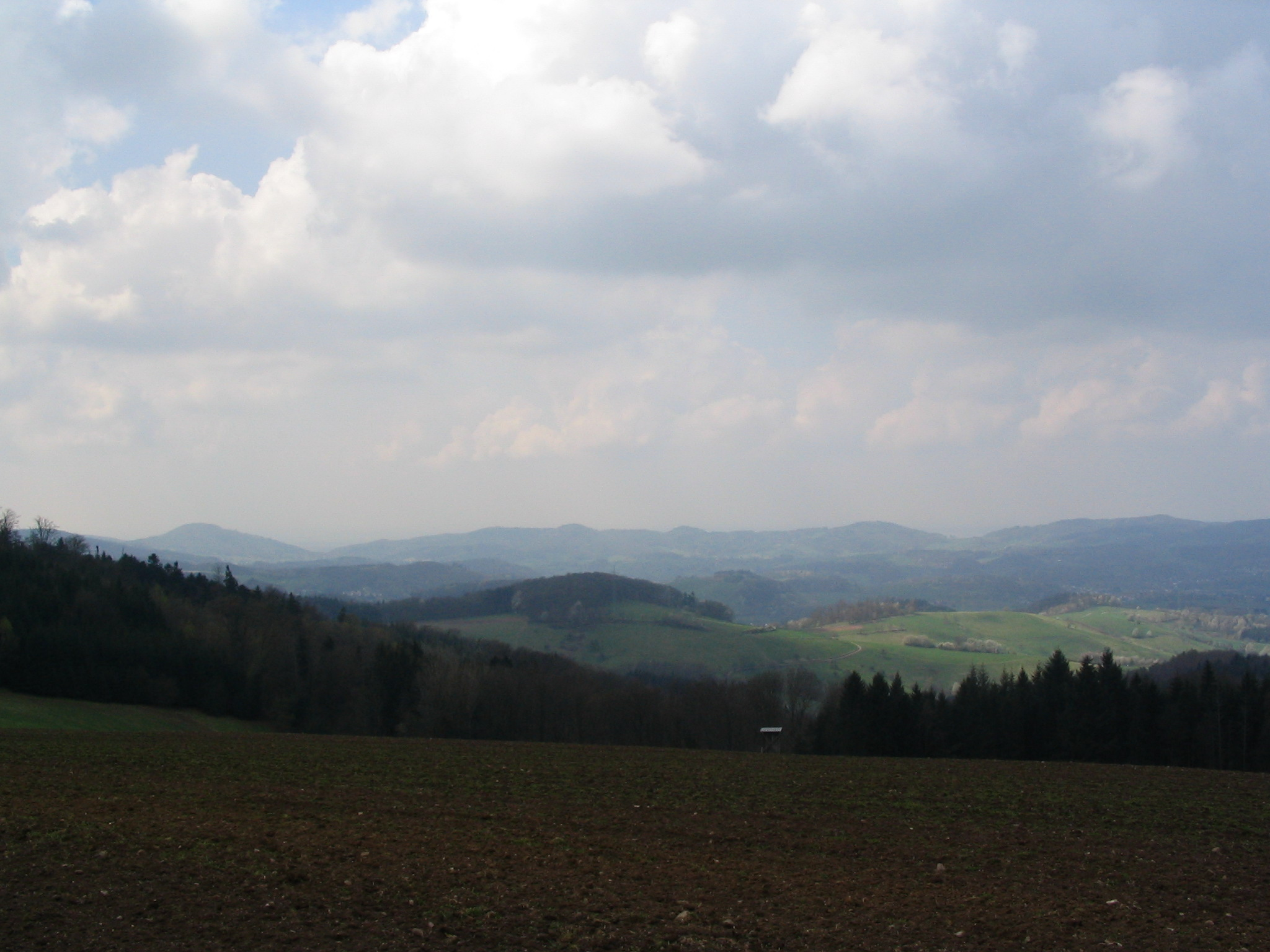
The Weschnitz-Valley with Hirschkopf-Juhöhe-mountain range (view from the Tromm)

==== Over 300 m ====
- Heiligenberg (445 m), Heidelberg, Baden-Württemberg
- Knorz (404 m; near Lautern), Bergstraße district, Hesse
- Otzberg (367 m; with Otzberg Castle), Darmstadt-Dieburg, Hesse
- Auerberg (339.70 m; with Schloss Auerbach), Bergstraße district, Hesse
- Breuberg (306 m; with Breuberg Castle), Odenwaldkreis, Hesse

=== Bodies of water ===
==== Flowing water ====
Countless streams rise in the Odenwald, the longest of which are the following:

- Weschnitz (60 km), tributary to the Rhine
- Mümling (50 km), tributary to the Main
- Gersprenz (47 km), tributary to the Main
- Lauter (43 km), tributary to the Rhine
- Erf (40 km), tributary to the Main
- Elz (Elzbach) (34 km), tributary to the Neckar
- Finkenbach (20.5 km), joins the Ulfenbach in Hirschhorn, runs to the Laxbach, tributary to the Neckar
- Ulfenbach (19.1 km), joins the Finkenbach in Hirschhorn, runs to the Laxbach, tributary to the Neckar
- Grundelbach, (10 km), flows from Trösel to Weinheim
- Modau (42 km), tributary to the Rhine
- Mud (24 km), tributary to the Main
- Steinach (22 km), tributary to the Neckar
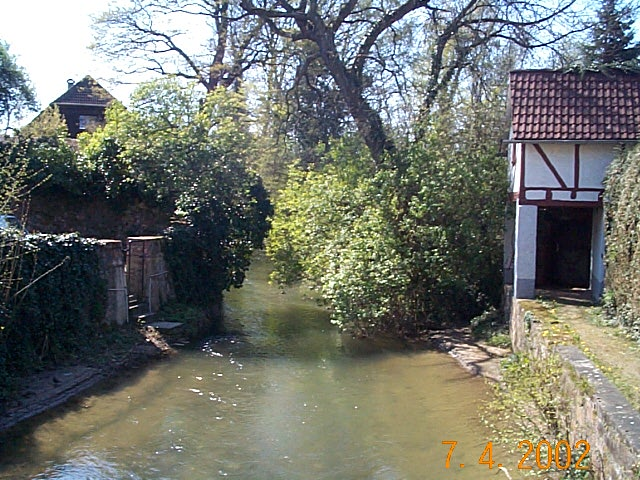
The Gersprenz in Dieburg

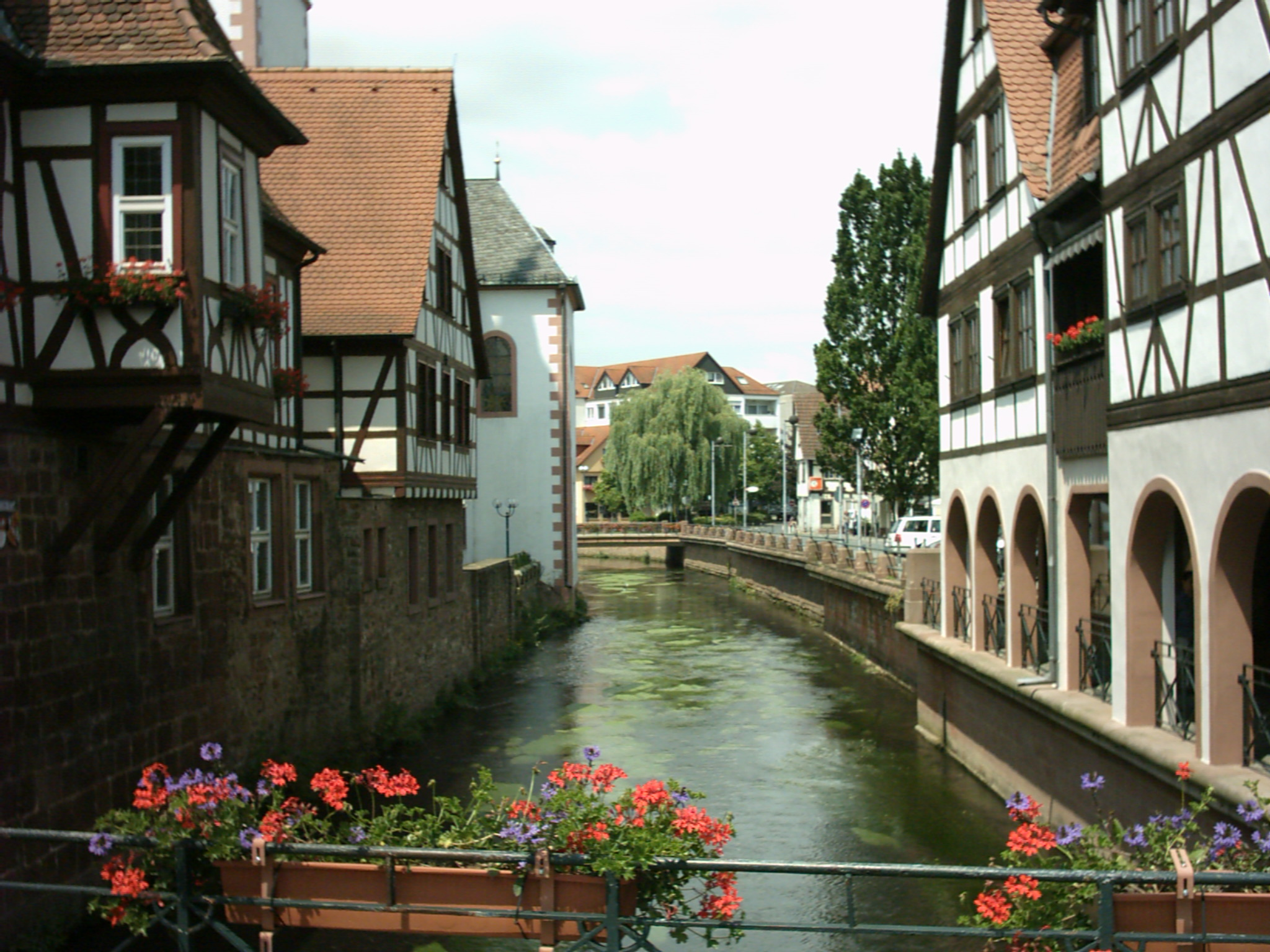
The Mümling in Erbach

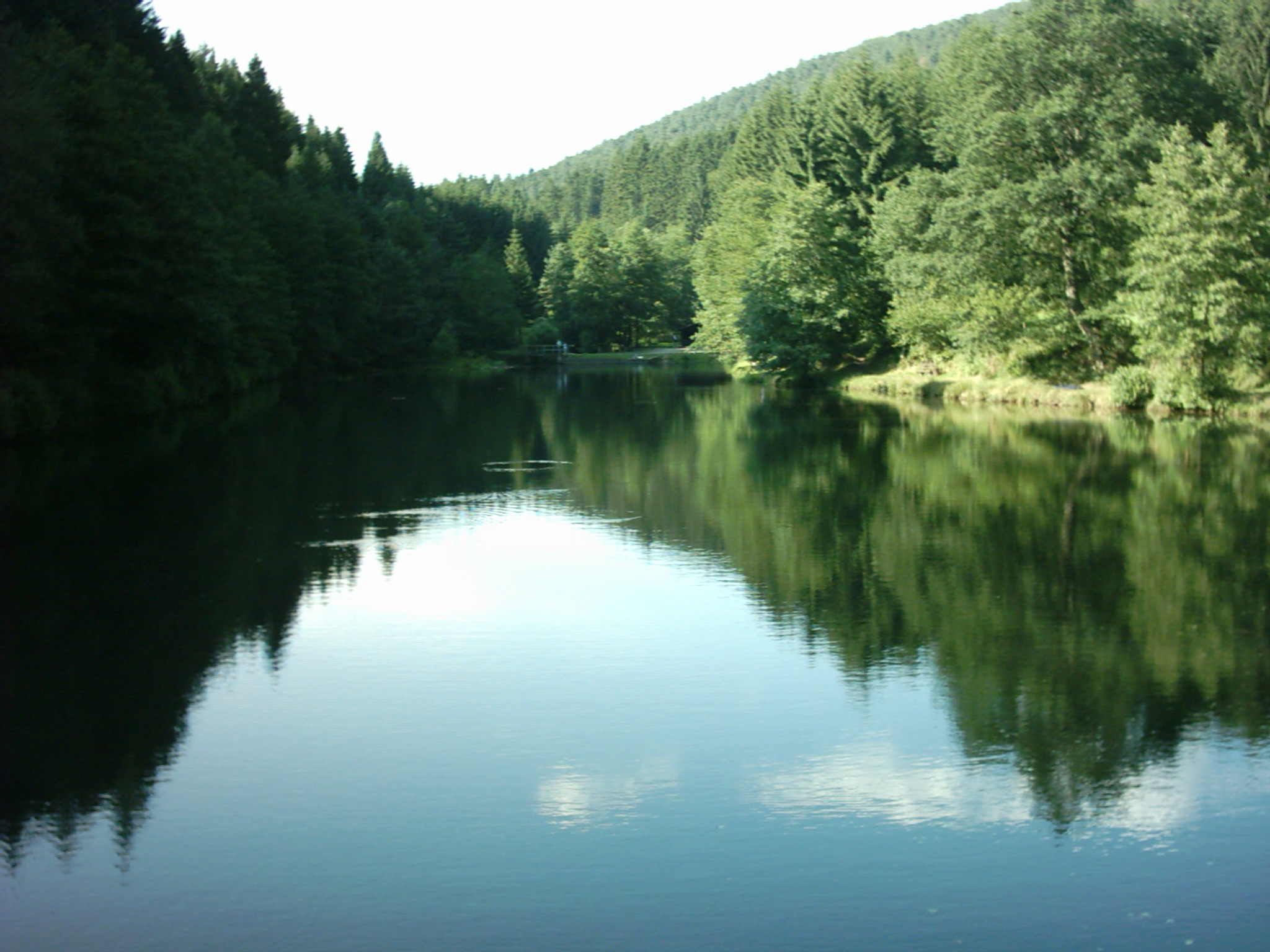
The Eutersee near Hesseneck

==== Standing water ====
There are a few bodies of standing water in the Odenwald, among which are the following:

- the Marbach Reservoir
- the Eutersee

== Political divisions ==
=== Districts (with district seats) ===
- Bergstraße district (Heppenheim)
- Darmstadt-Dieburg (Dieburg, administration in Darmstadt-Kranichstein)
- Main-Tauber-Kreis (Tauberbischofsheim)
- Miltenberg district (Miltenberg)
- Neckar-Odenwald-Kreis (Mosbach)
- Odenwaldkreis (Erbach)
- Rhein-Neckar-Kreis (Heidelberg)

=== District-free cities ===
Heidelberg with the castle and the Königstuhl

- Heidelberg
- Darmstadt

== International relations ==
=== Twin towns – Sister cities ===
Odenwald is twinned with:

- Falkirk, Scotland

== Transport and tourism ==
The Odenwald is known as a leisure destination easily accessible from the urban areas of Mannheim and Frankfurt. It is known for its clean thin air and was once known for its health sanitariums. There are many marked hiking paths through the rural areas. Wild blueberries, strawberries and mushrooms are to be found in the forests.

=== Roads ===
The planned extension to the Odenwaldautobahn, that is, the A 45 (Dortmund–Aschaffenburg), was never realized. Nevertheless, all these Bundesstraßen run through the Odenwald:

- B 27: Mosbach - Buchen - Tauberbischofsheim
- B 38: Reinheim - Groß-Bieberau - Brensbach - Reichelsheim - Fürth - Mörlenbach - Birkenau - Weinheim
- B 45: Groß-Umstadt - Höchst - Bad König - Michelstadt - Erbach - Beerfelden - Eberbach
- B 47: Bensheim - Lindenfels - Reichelsheim - Michelstadt - Amorbach
- B 426: Darmstadt - Mühltal - Ober-Ramstadt - Reinheim - Otzberg - Groß-Umstadt - Höchst - Breuberg - Obernburg
- B 460: Heppenheim - Fürth - Mossautal - Hüttenthal

Furthermore, the Nibelungenstraße and the Siegfriedstraße run through the Odenwald, partly along the roads listed above.

=== Railways ===
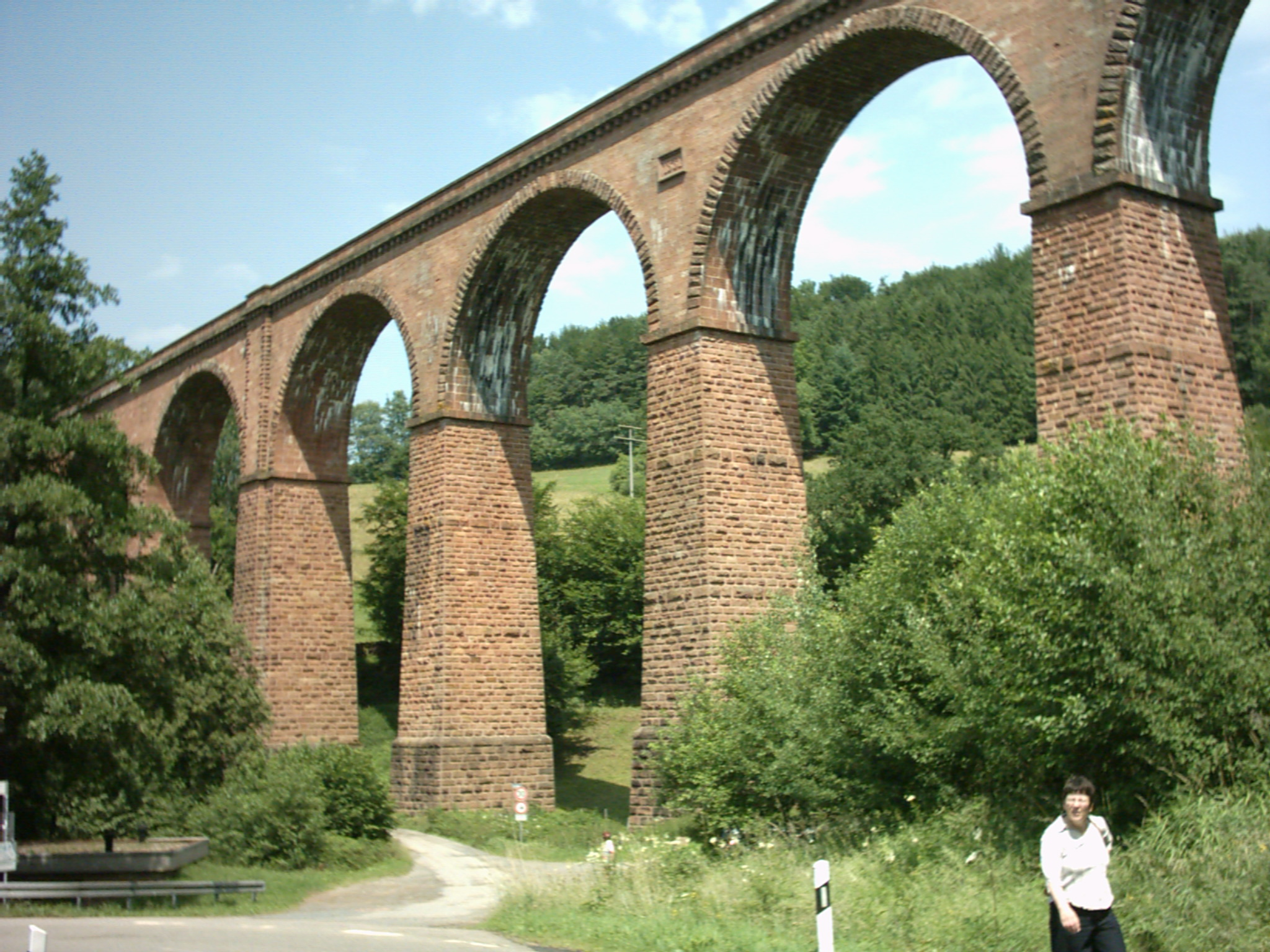
The Himbächel viaduct on the Odenwald Railway

- Odenwald Railway from Darmstadt or Hanau by way of Groß-Umstadt Wiebelsbach to Eberbach, opened in 1882, since December 2005 run with modern Itino trains.
- Weschnitz Valley Railway from Weinheim to Fürth, opened in 1895.
- Überwald Railway from Mörlenbach by way of Wald-Michelbach to Wahlen, opened in 1901, abandoned in 1996.
- Hetzbach–Beerfelden line from Hetzbach to Beerfelden, opened in 1904, abandoned in 1954.
- Mosbach–Mudau line (locally known as the Entenmörder – “Duck Murderer”) from Mosbach to Mudau, former 1,000 mm (3 ft 3 in) narrow-gauge railway, opened in 1905, abandoned in 1973, since 1980 right-of-way has been converted into a cycling path.
- Neckar Valley Railway from Heidelberg by way of Eberbach and Mosbach to Bad Friedrichshall-Jagstfeld, opened in 1879.
- Neckarelz–Osterburken line, opened in 1866 as part of the Baden Odenwaldbahn
- Madonnenland Railway from Seckach to Miltenberg.
- Gersprenz Valley Railway from Reinheim to Reichelsheim, opened in 1887 and abandoned by 1963.

=== Special day trips ===
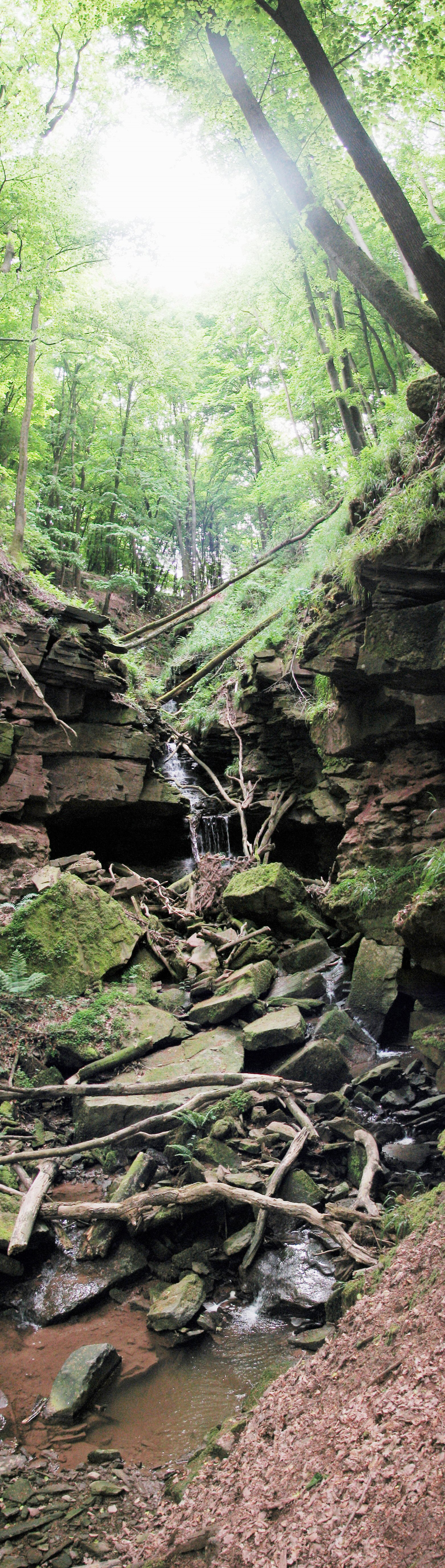
The Margarethenschlucht (gorge)

- In Hainstadt, Hesse (a constituent community of Breuberg) in the Mümling valley is a quarry which has been turned into a climbing facility by the Odenwälder Kletterfreunde ('Odenwald Climbing Friends'). There is also a climbing path secured by wire cables. The Odenwald Climbing Friends take care of the paths. The quarry also lies in the DAV's (Deutsche Alpenverein e. V. – a mountain climbing club) Darmstadt Section feeder area.
- Beneath the 514 m-high Felsberg and north of Lautertal-Reichenbach is found a Felsenmeer – literally 'cliff sea' – consisting of many weathered stones strewn about the ground which have fallen down from the cliff after having come loose from erosion. The Romans used it as a stone quarry.
- In Eberstadt, a constituent community of Buchen, one of southern Germany's most important dripstone caves was discovered in 1971. It is open to the public.
- Around the Katzenbuckel runs the Kristall-Lehrpfad ('Crystal Teaching Path'), which graphically shows the volcanic development in the Odenwald.
- From Höchst im Odenwald snakes the Obrunnschlucht (gorge) as a romantic fairytale path towards Rimhorn with many model buildings (palaces, castles and mills) along the valley.
- The Odenwald is threaded with a network of more than 10,000 km (6,214 miles) of hiking trails.
- Because the roads have so many bends, the Odenwald is a popular outing destination for motorcyclists.
- Every year one of the greatest Halloween events in Germany is organized on the Frankenstein Castle (see above). The same name suggests a connection with Mary Shelleys famous filmed novel Frankenstein or The Modern Prometheus. The horror scenery and the comedians dressed up as ghosts and witches spook the huge audience.
- Walking and climbing through the Margarethenschlucht (Neckargerach) or the Wolfsschlucht (Wolf's Glen) near Zwingenberg castle (Zwingenberg/Neckar)
- Zwingenberg Castle (see above) is the place of an annual castle festival. Carl Maria von Webers romantic opera Der Freischütz (translated as The Marksman or The Freeshooter) is performed at the entrance of the gorge Wolfsschlucht. The plot is based on a German folk legend which the composer discovered in the Gespensterbuch ('Book of Ghosts') during his sojourn in Neuburg Abbey near Heidelberg in 1810. It is believed, that he also was inspired by the Wolf's Glen in a Neckar tributary valley, but there are many places in Germany with the same name. Anyway. In act 2 the protagonist Max meets the diabolic Caspar in the supernatural creepy opera scene Wolfsschlucht to become the best shooter with the assistance of magic power. Now a risky action starts.

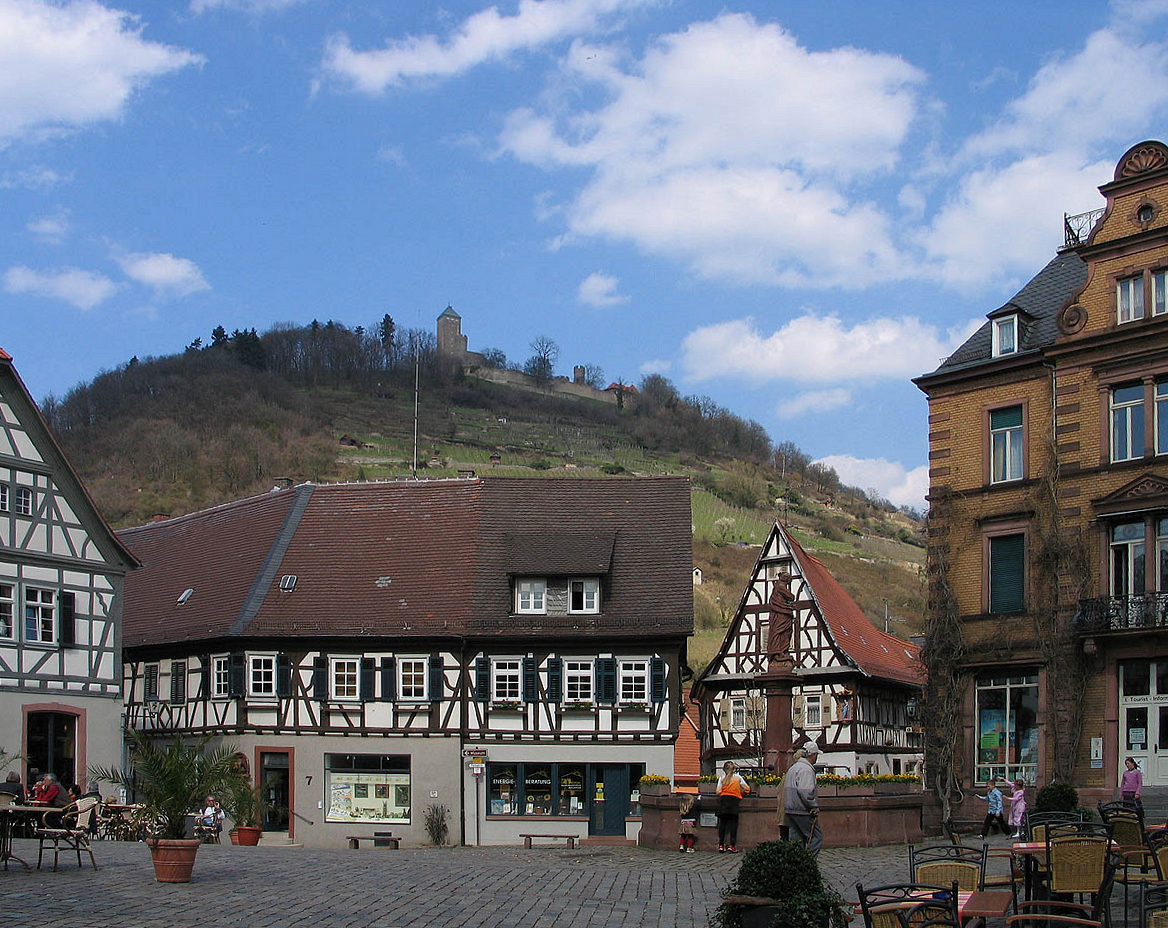
Every year the Heppenheimer Street Theatre Gassensensationen occupies the marketplace and other corners of the old town.

- For half a week early July the Heppenheimer (see above) Street theatre named Gassensensationen occupies several places und corners of the old town with presentations for children and adults. The outdoor performances include very popular loud and simple genres with music, dance, mime, circus arts and slapstick, but also sensitive theatre plays or songs in discrete spaces.
- The granite rocks of the Juhöhe near Heppenheim inspired people to imagine fairy tales. They told, that the holes were offering cups for the devil. Stones nearby got chapped, when he sharpened his claws. According to a local version of the Rodensteiner legend the Wild Hunter crossing the Juhöhe lost his cry of hounds: They crashed and where rammed in the ground. Even today the petrified dogheads are on view at the top of the hill. So the rocks are called Hundsköpfe. Flat iron is the name of another granite formation near the Juhöhe. A long time ago Giant-ladies made use of it to set their Sunday dresses in order.
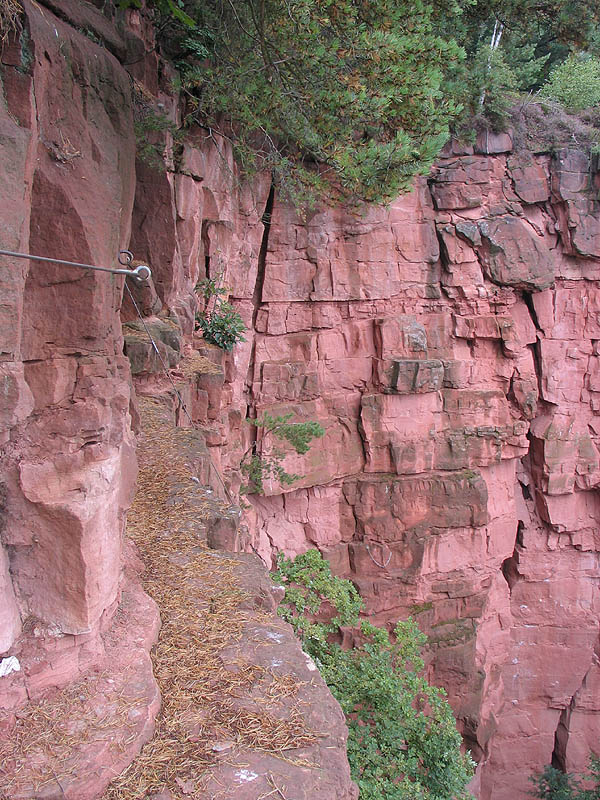
Climbing path at the Breuberg-Hainstadt quarry

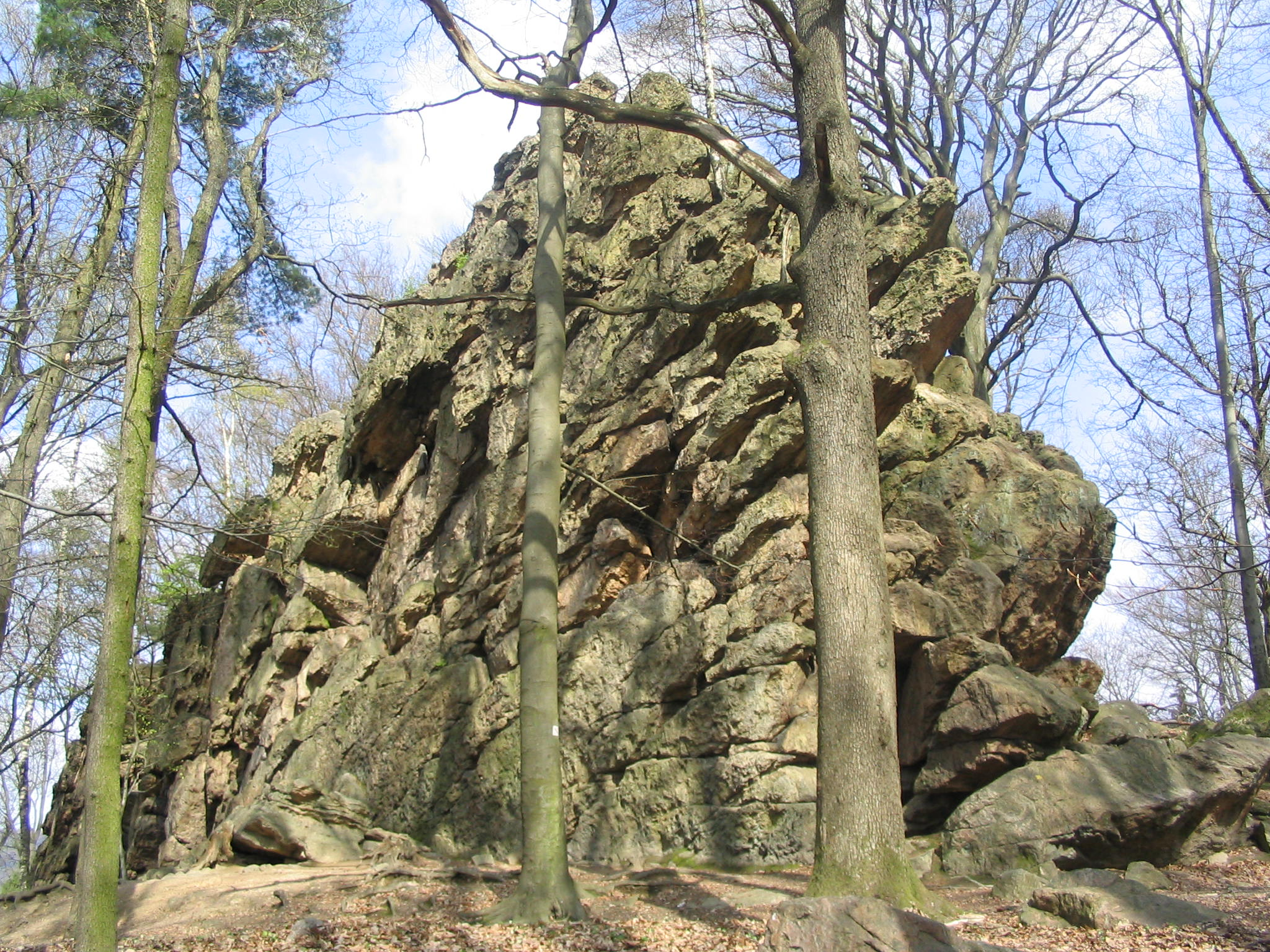
Hohenstein near Reichenbach (Baryte-quartz-cliff)

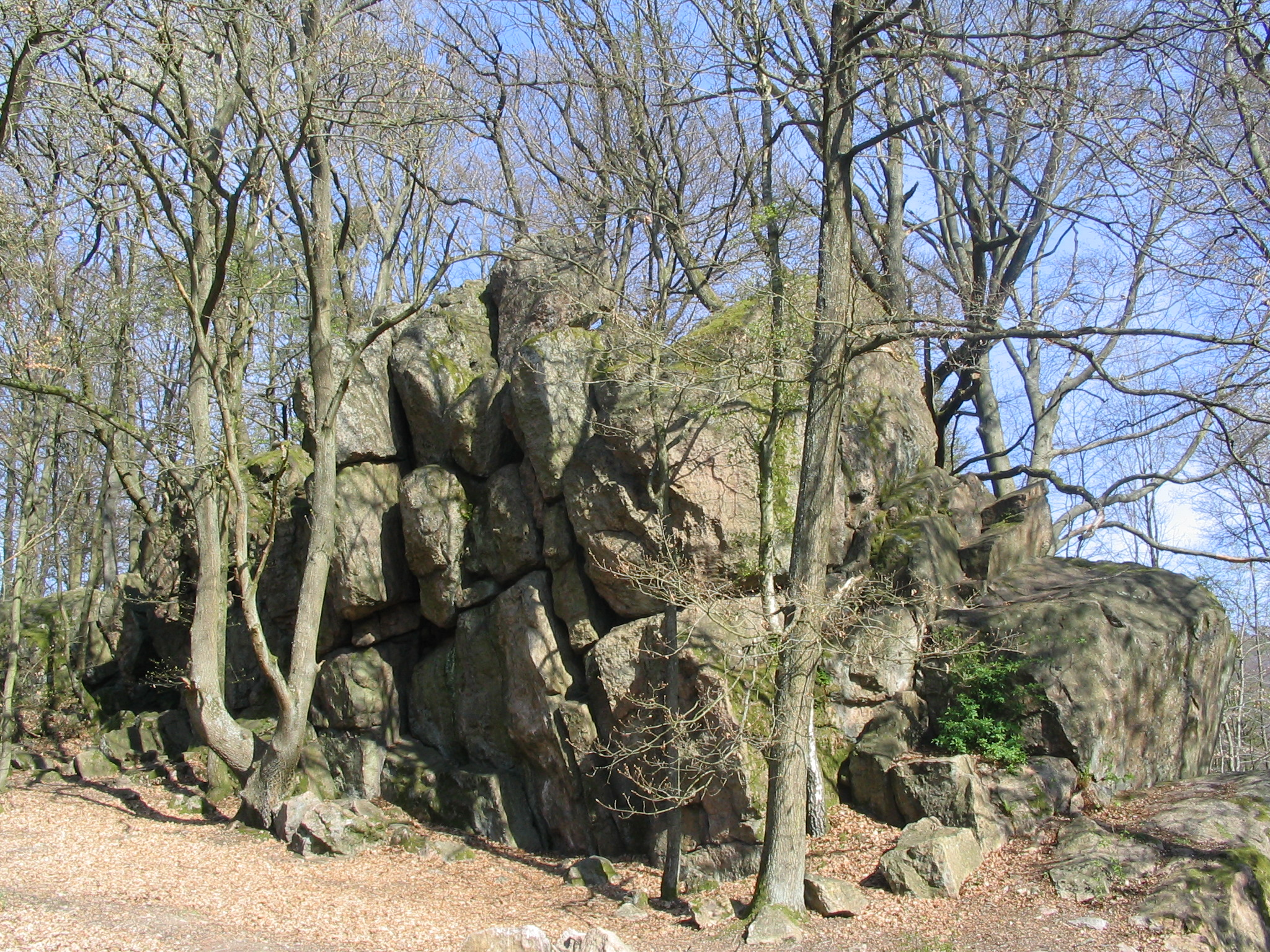
Borstein near Reichenbach (Baryte-quartz-cliff)

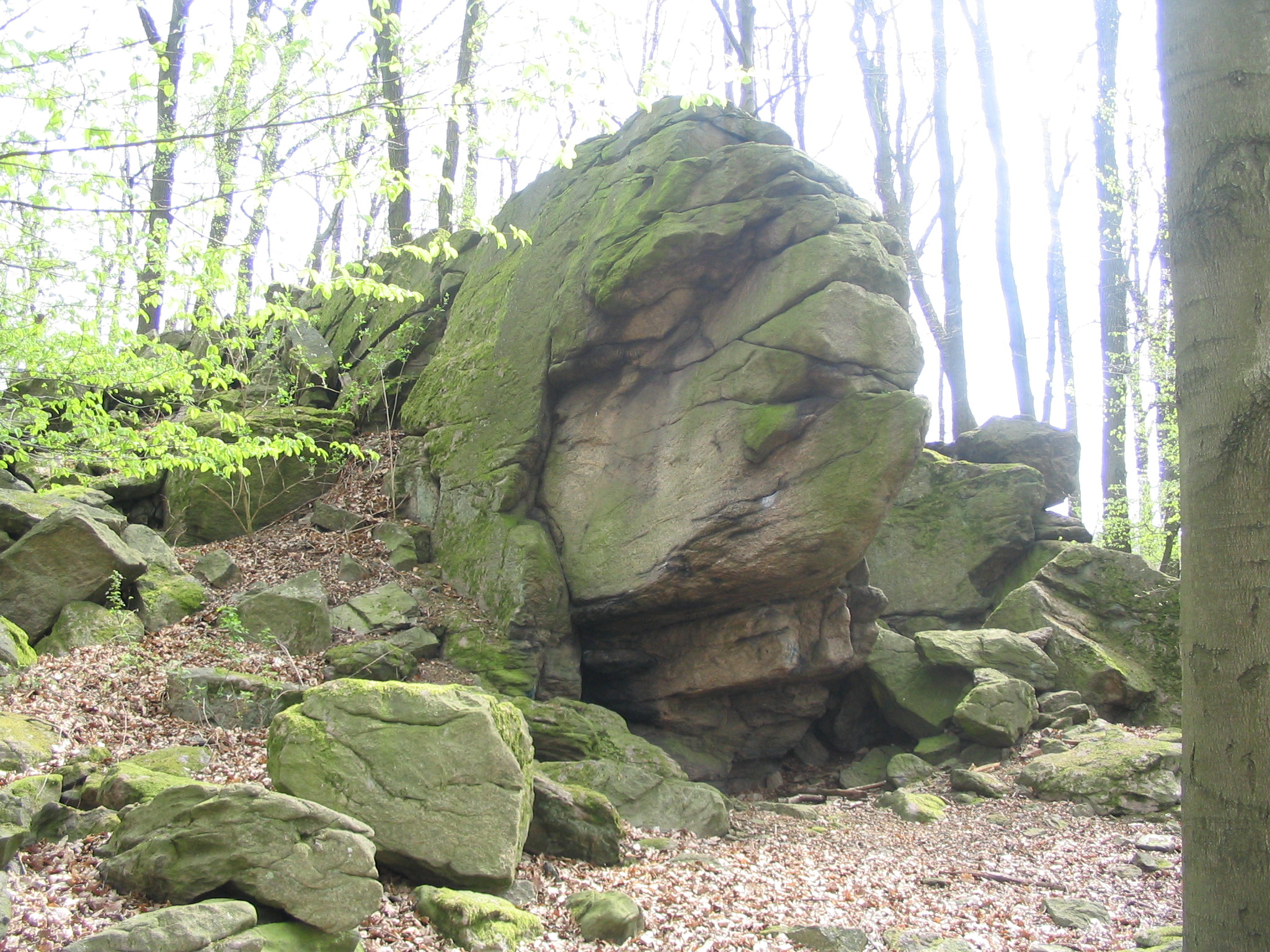
Giant tortoise gneiss rocks (Böllstein)

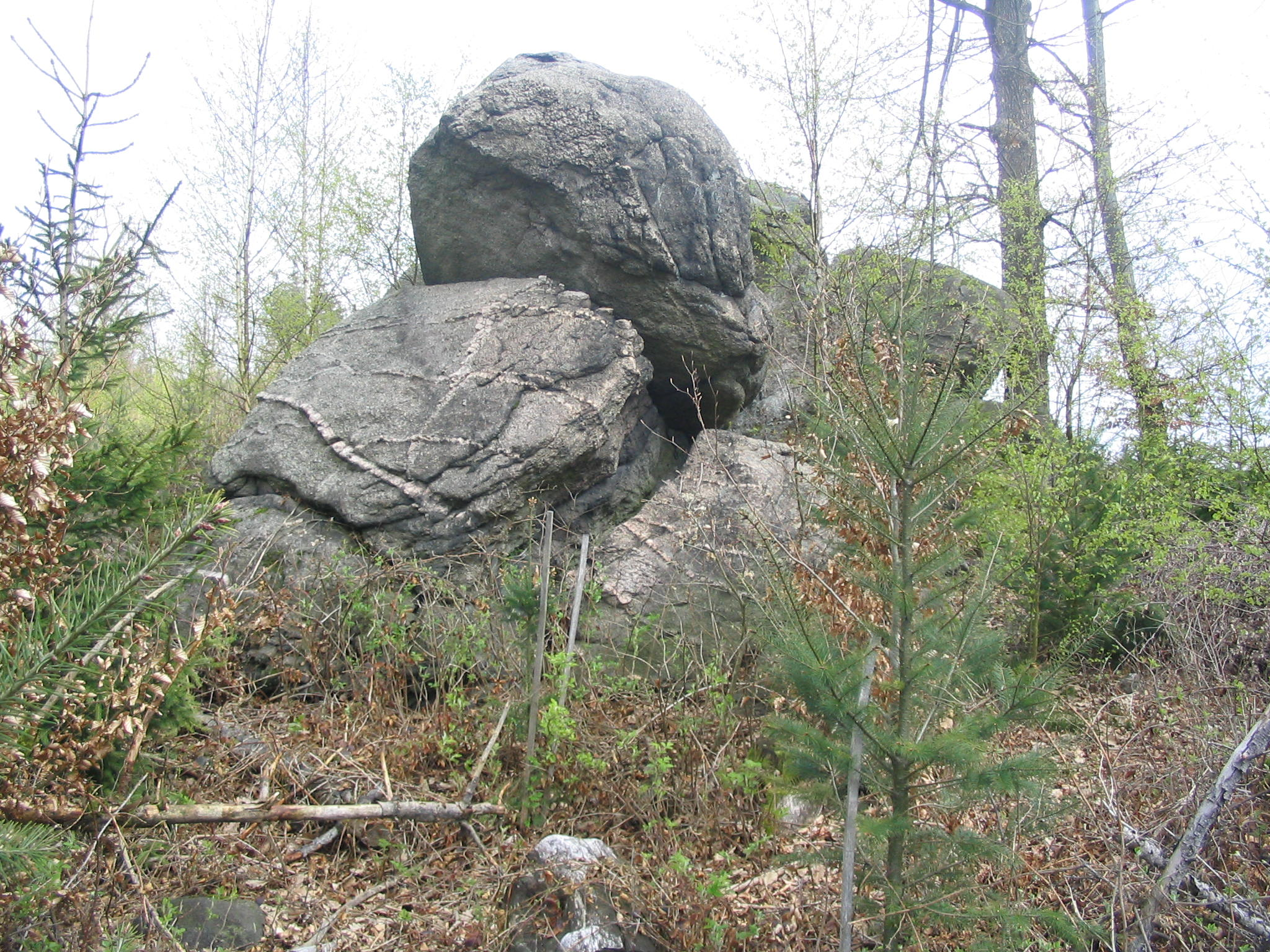
Granite rocks (Tromm)

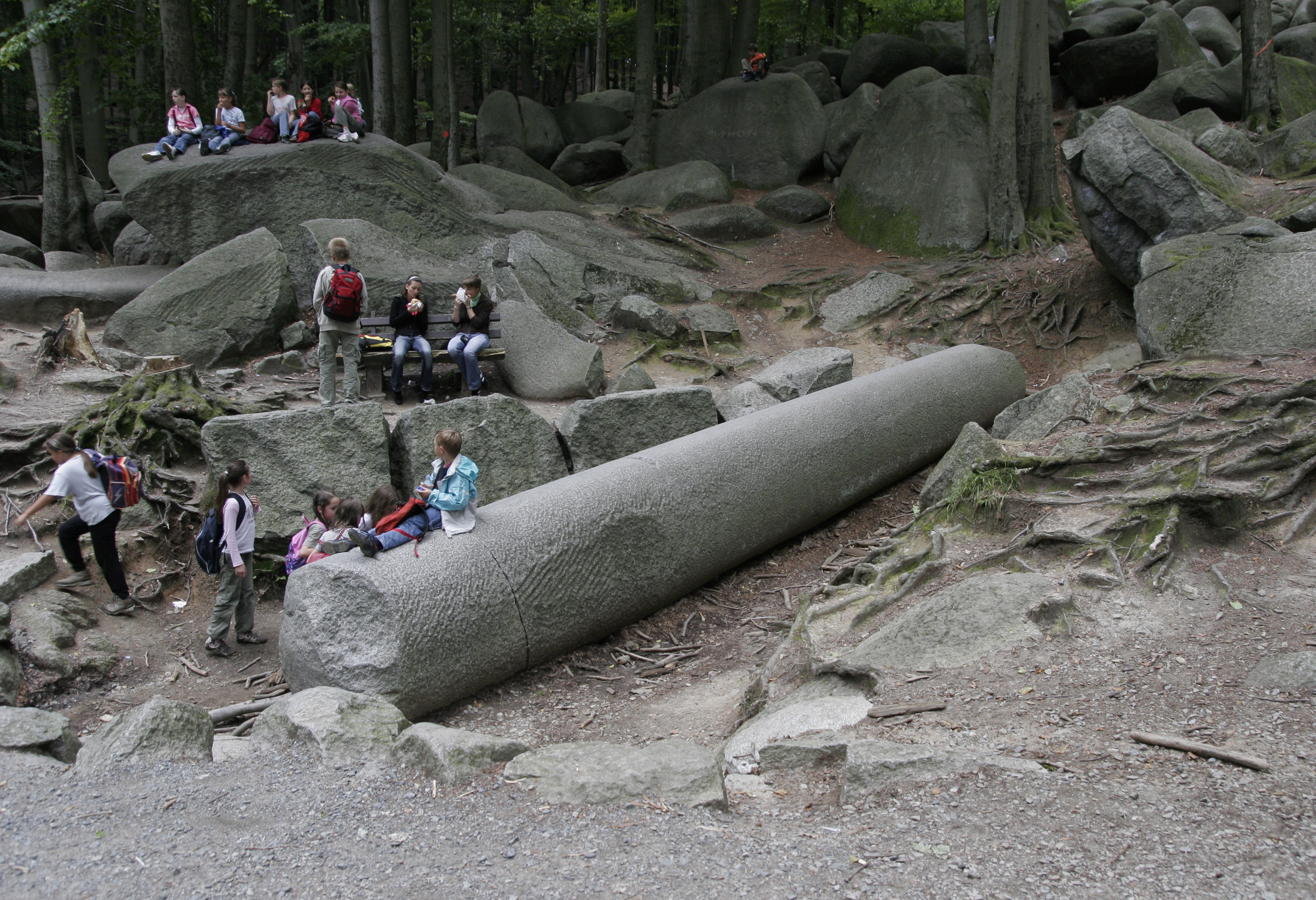
Reichenbach-Felsenmeer: The giant column (Riesensäule) is a workpiece of Roman stonemasons.

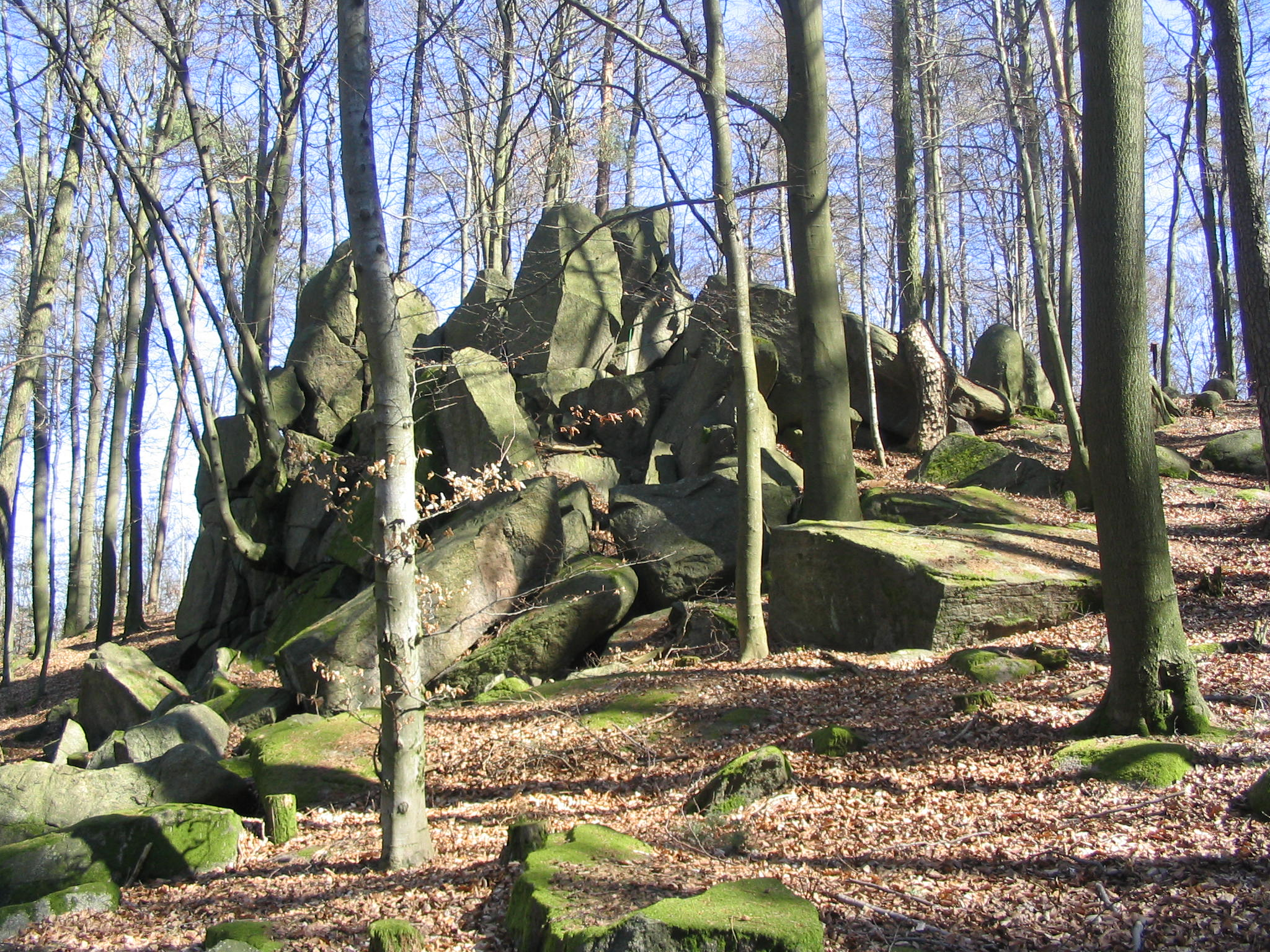
Granite rocks Wildfrauhaus (Fischbachtal)

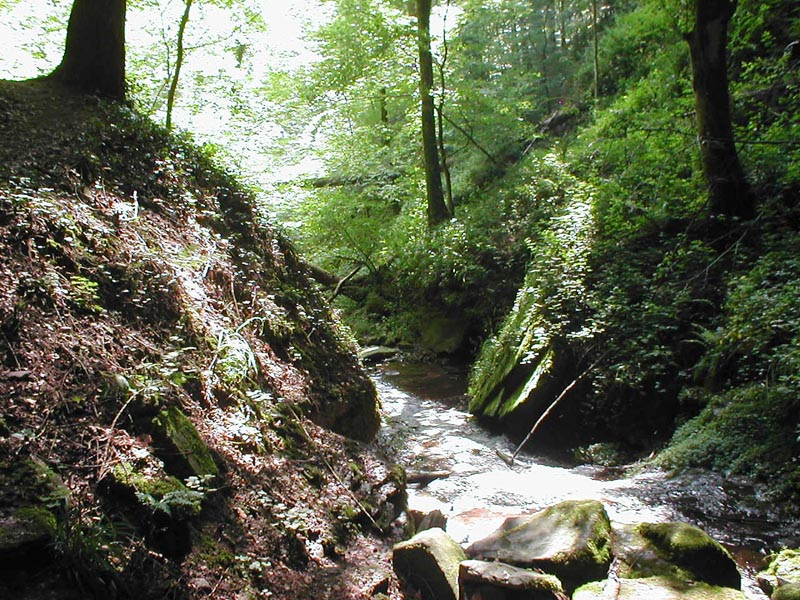
Zwingenberg (Neckar) gorge: Wolfsschlucht

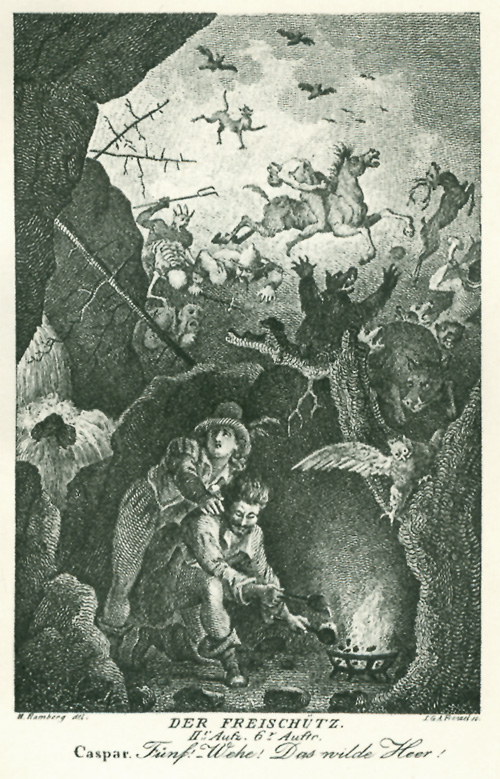
When Caspar und Max begin with casting the magic bullets in the Wolf’s Glen the Wild Hunt appears in the air with demoniacal noise.

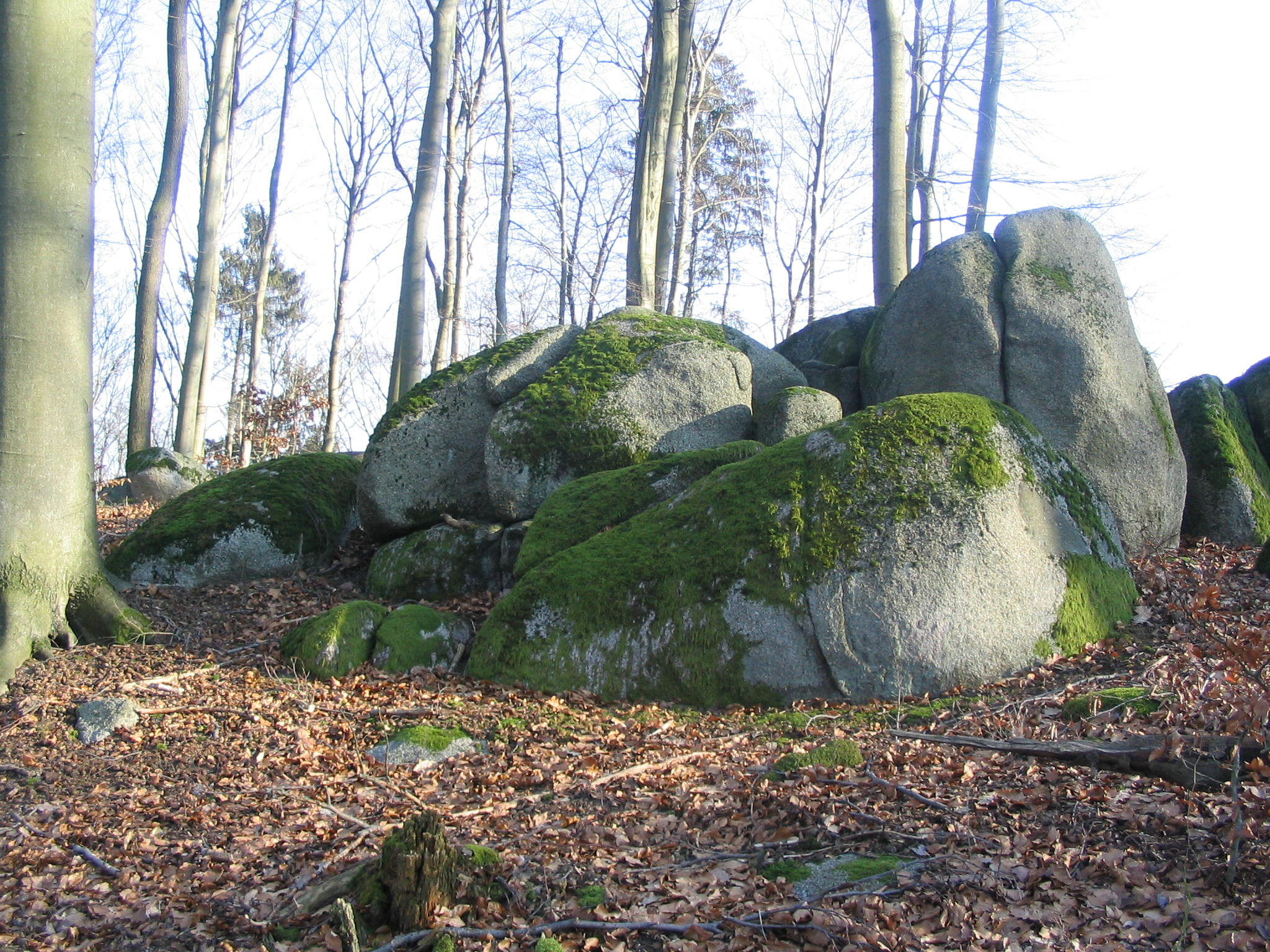
The rocks at the Juhöhe are supposed to be the petrified dogheads of the Rodensteiner cry of hounds.

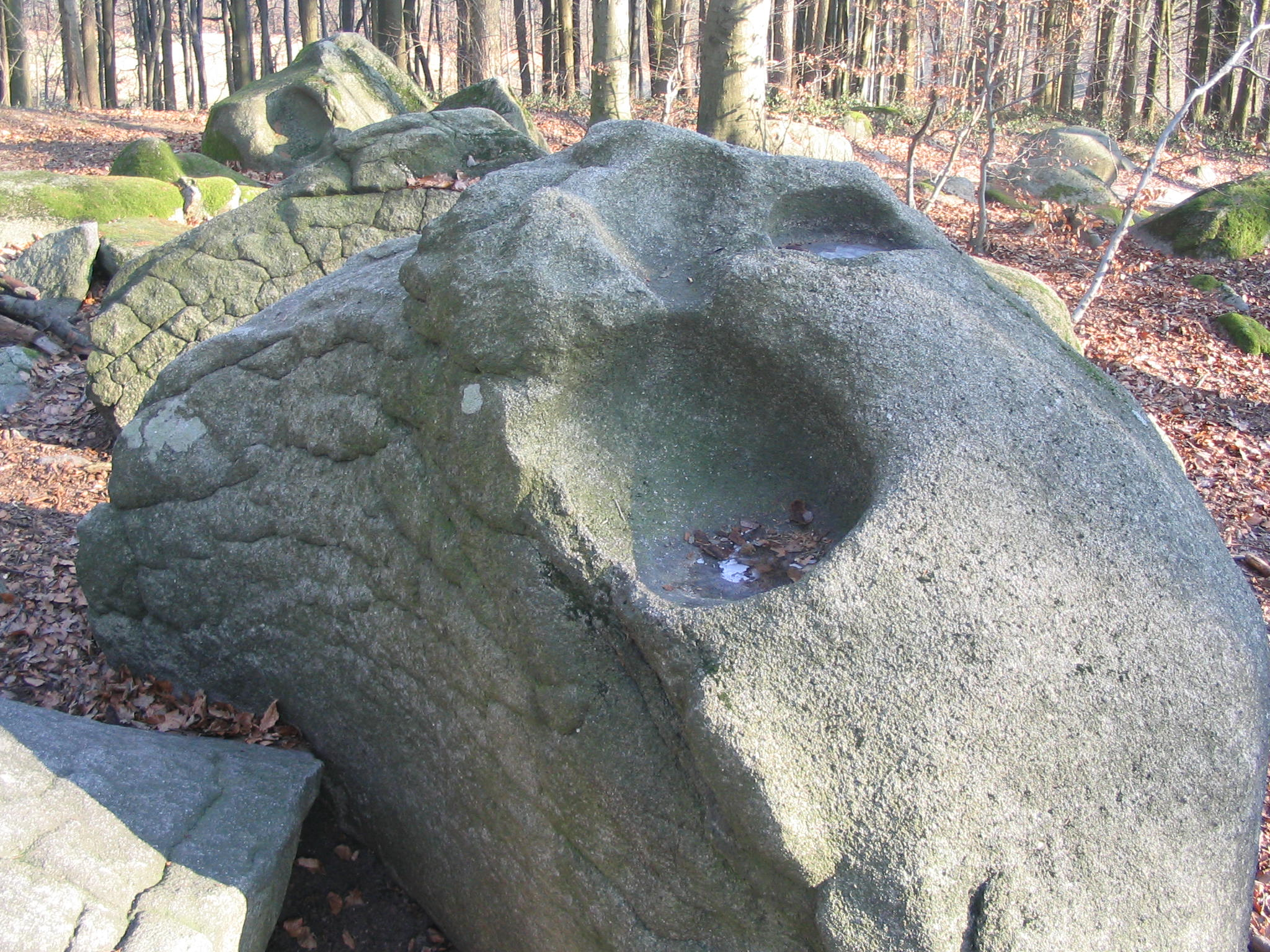
It is said that the holes of the Opfersteine were offering cups for the devil.

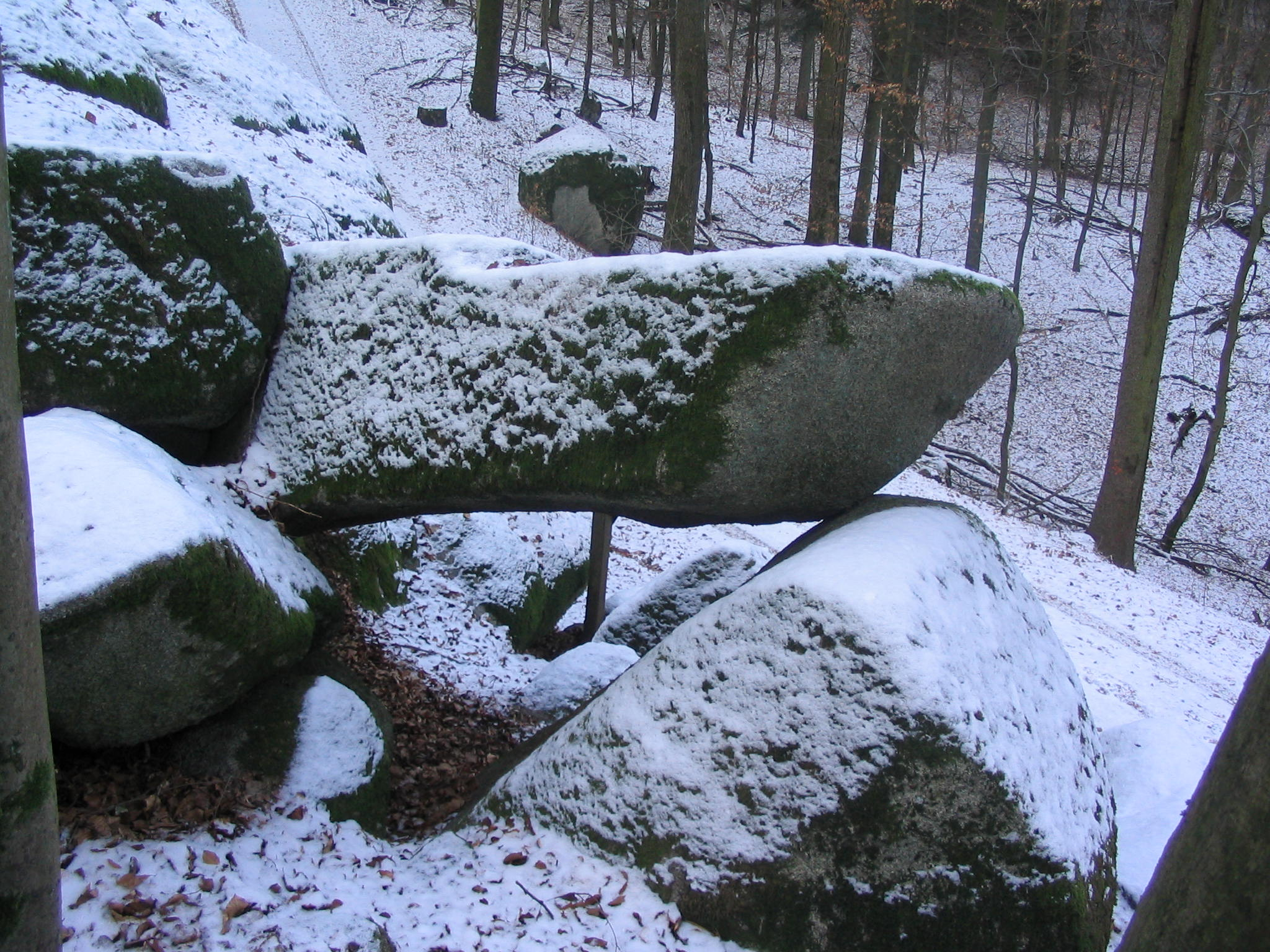
People of the Kreiswald near the Juhöhe told, that a long time ago the granite formation was the flat iron of Giant-ladies

=== Castles ===
The Odenwald is home to many historic castles and palatial residences. In times past the fortresses on the top of the Odenwald mountains controlled Bergstraße and the Weschnitz-, the Gersprenz-, the Mümling- and the Neckar-Valley.

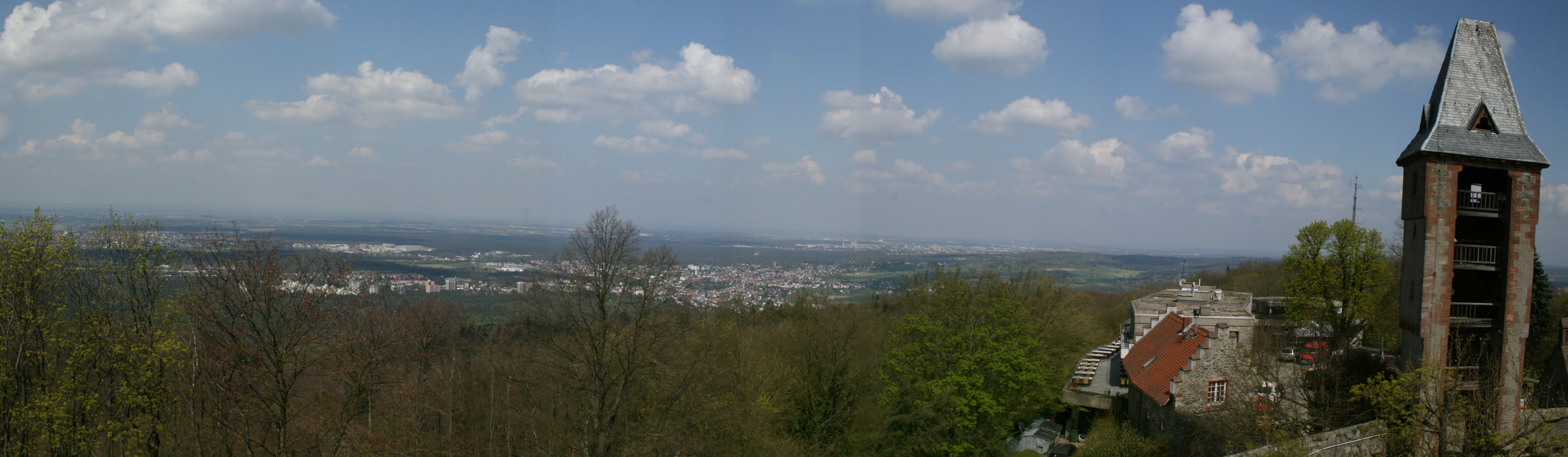
Frankenstein near Darmstadt/Upper Rhine Rift valley

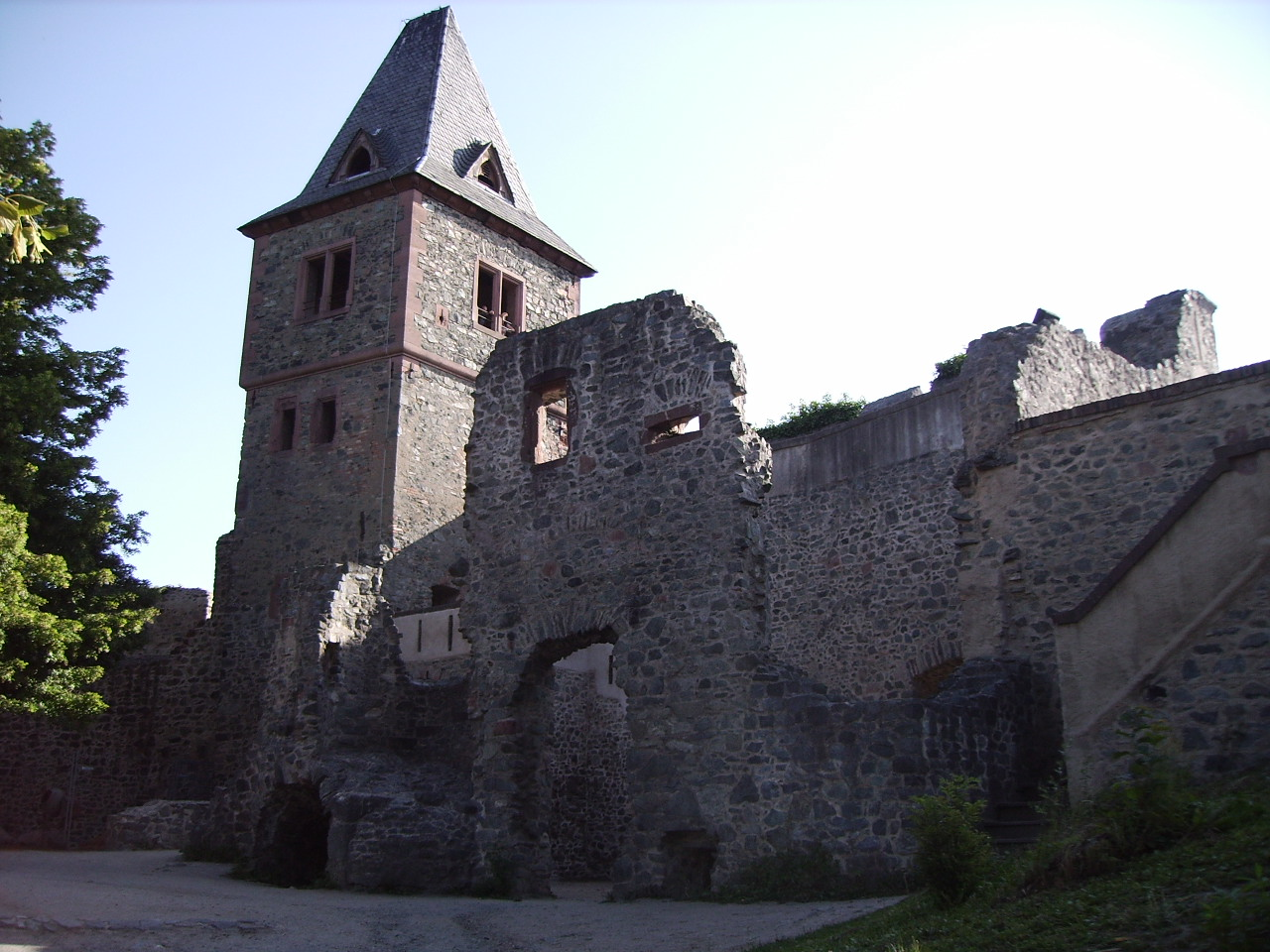
Frankenstein Castle

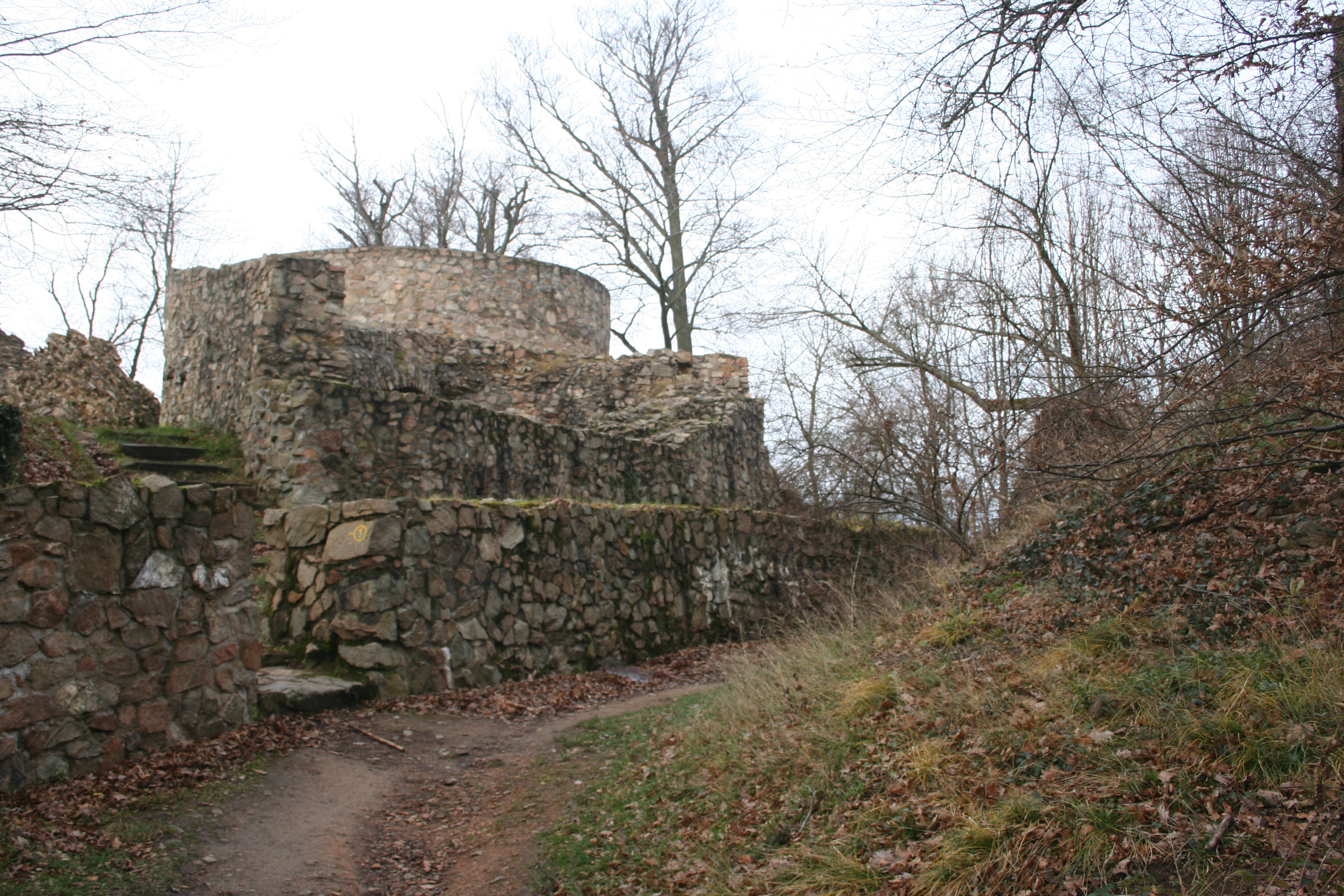
The ruins of Tannenberg near Seeheim (Seeheim-Jugenheim)

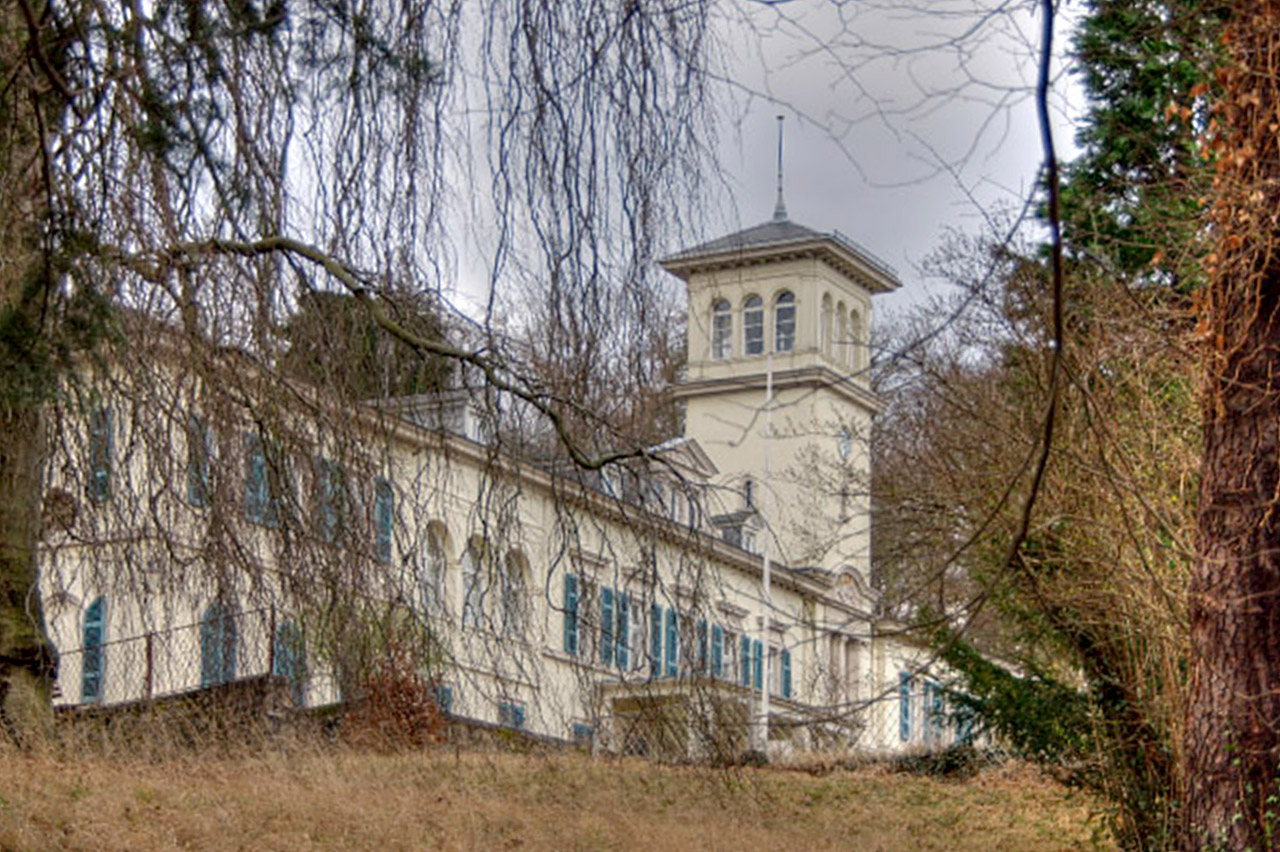
Heiligenberg Castle near Jugenheim (Seeheim-Jugenheim)

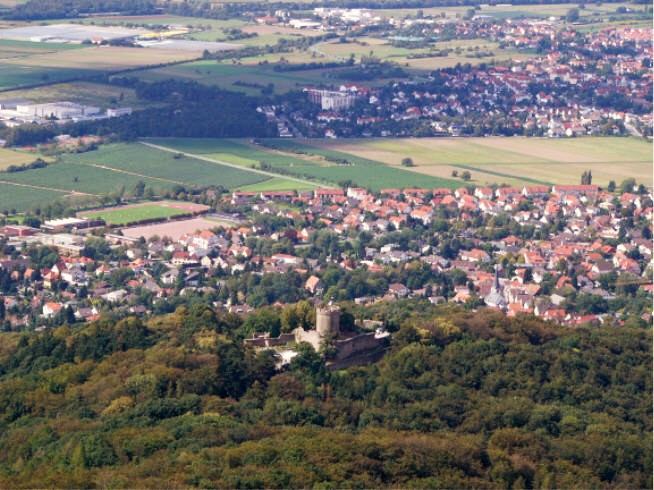
Alsbach Castle, view from Melibokus (Alsbach-Hähnlein)

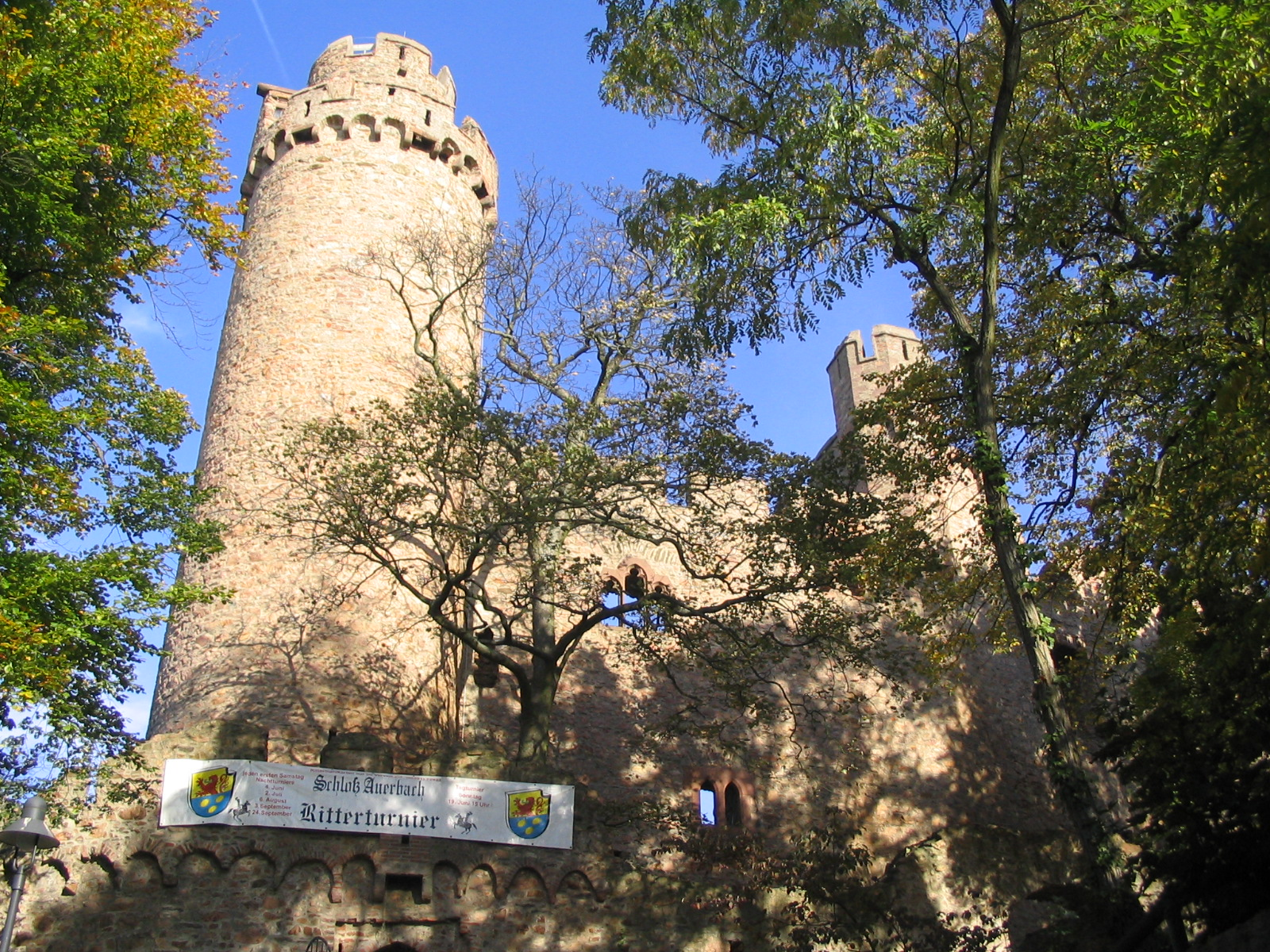
The ruins of Auerbach Castle near Bensheim

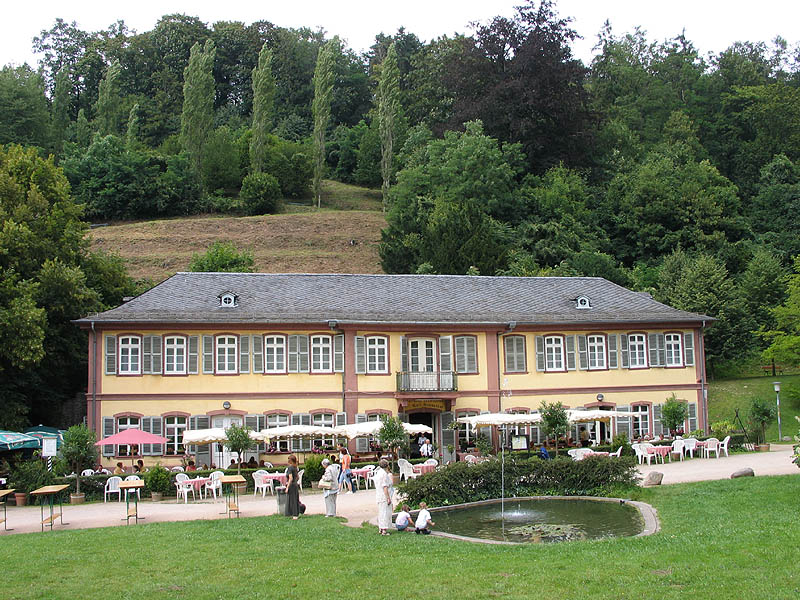
Park and mansion Fürstenlager near Bensheim-Auerbach

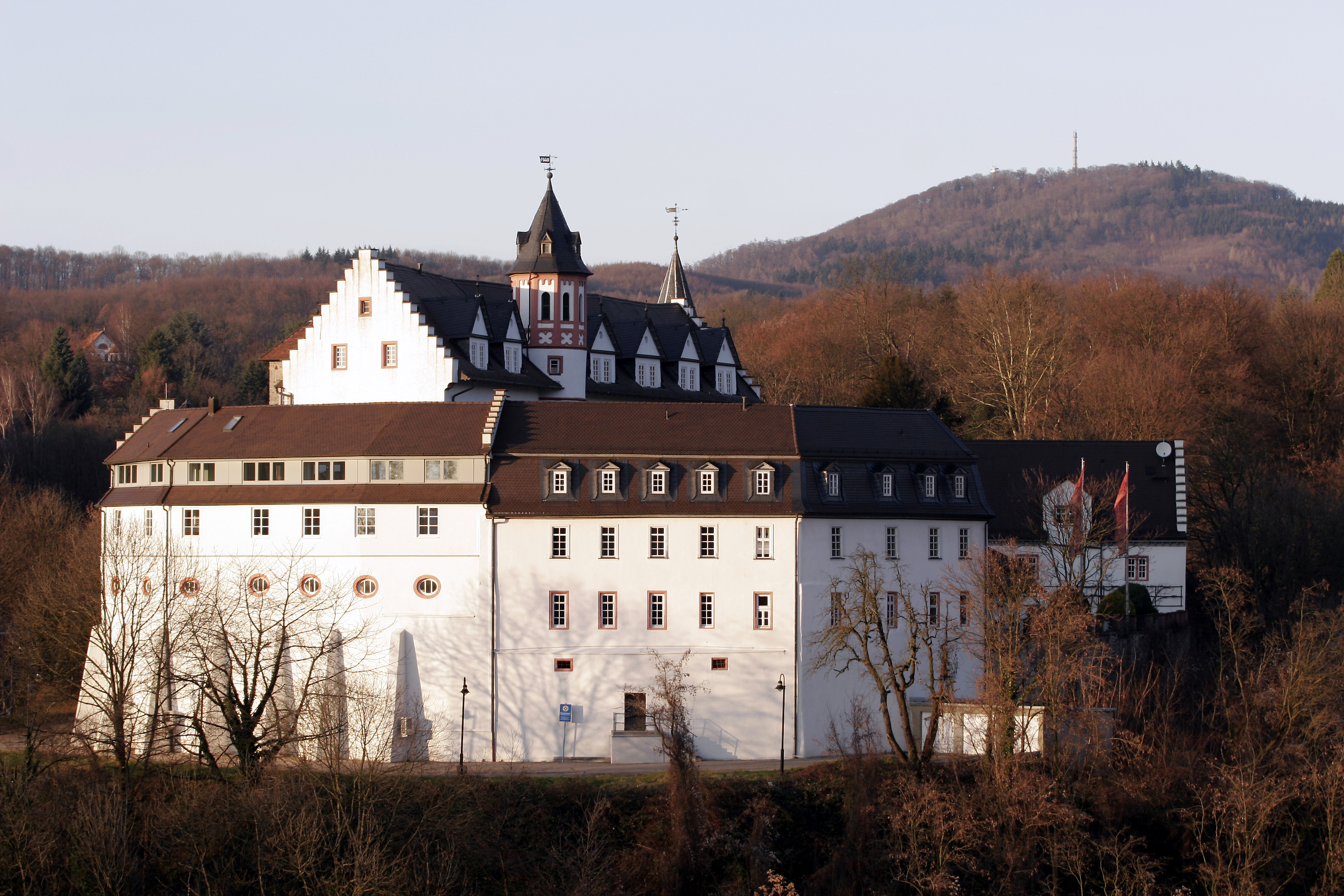
Schönberg Castle (Bensheim-Schönberg)

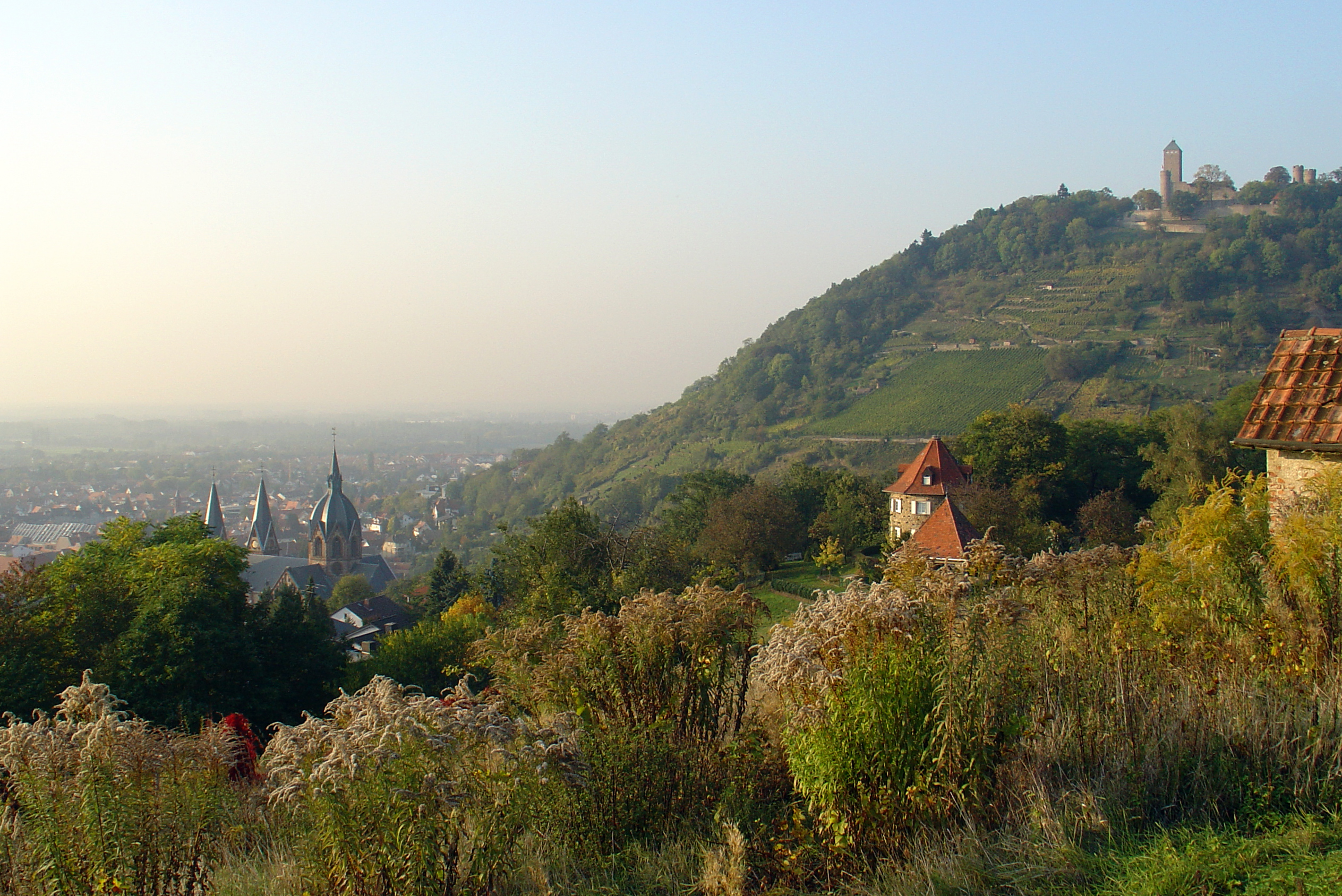
Bergstaße: Starkenburg (view from Maiberg, Heppenheim)

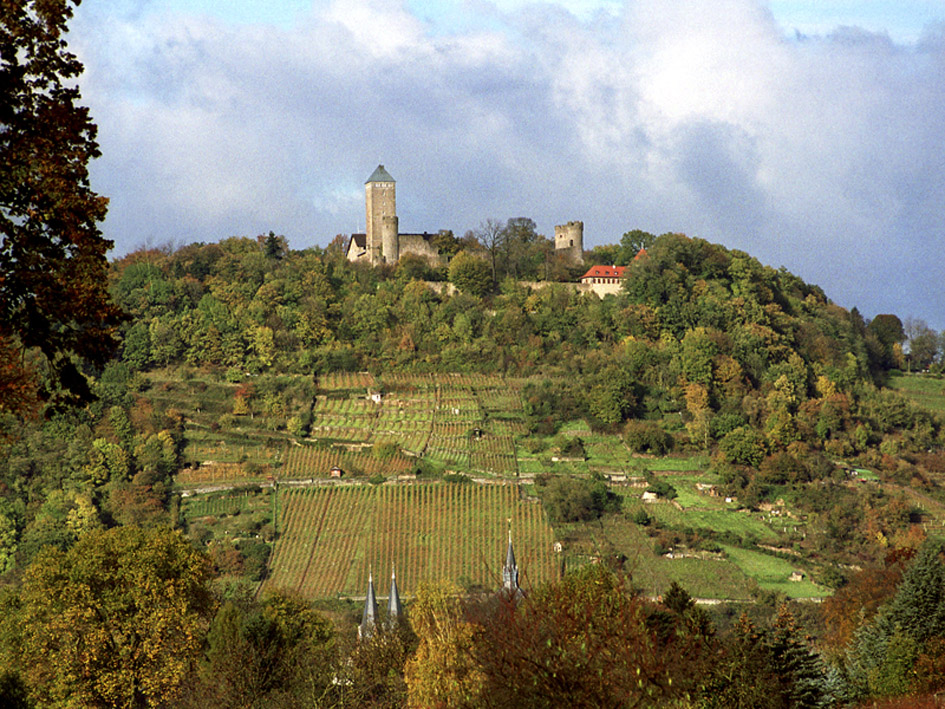
Starkenburg with Schlossberg (Heppenheim)

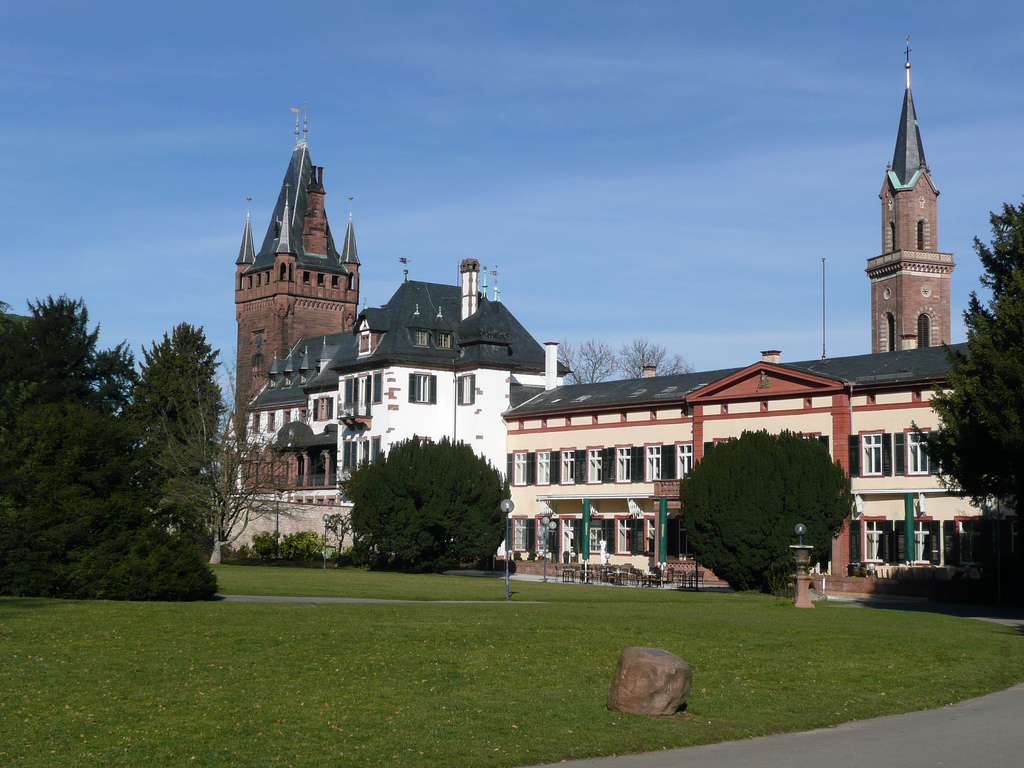
Weinheim Castle

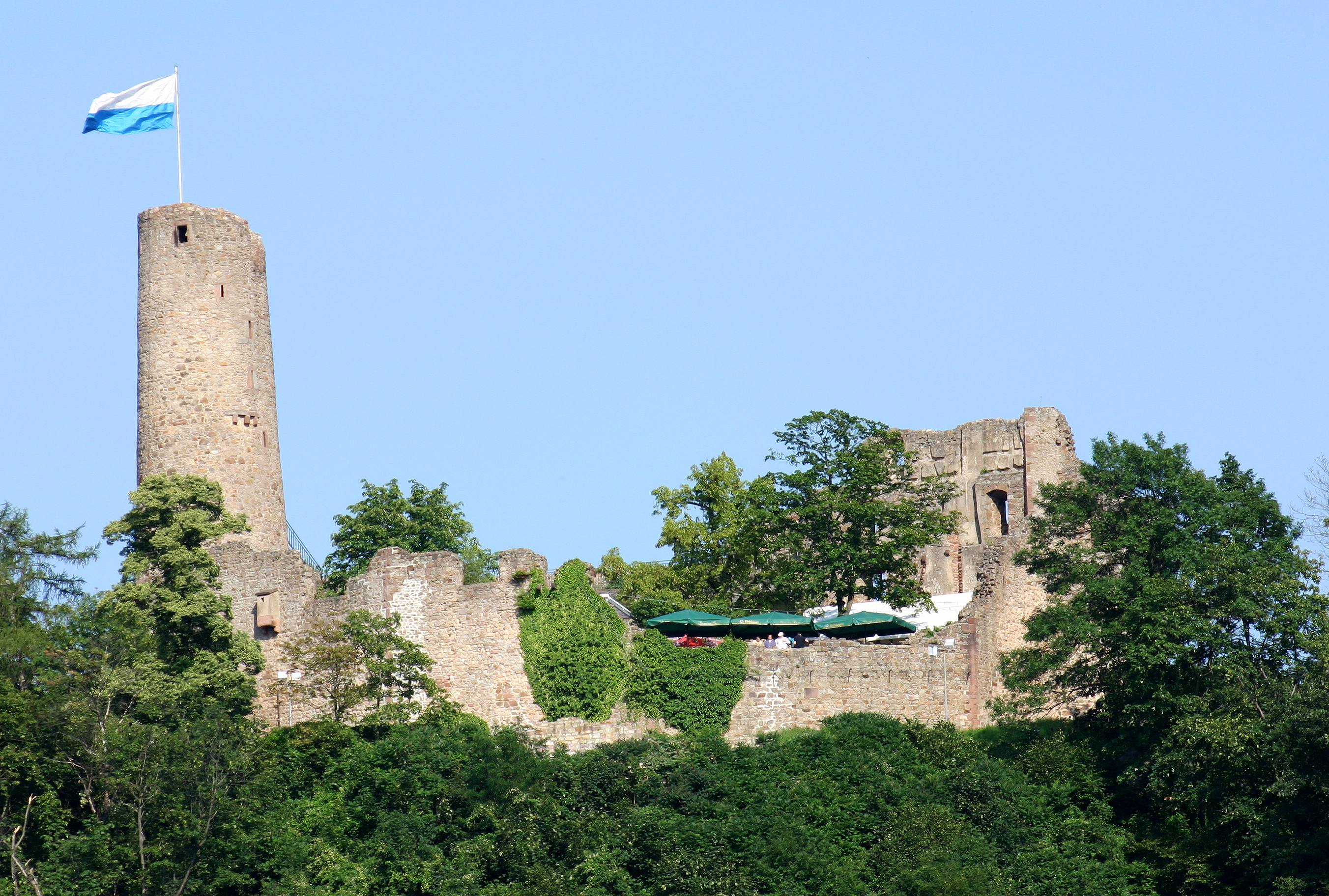
The ruins of Windeck (Weinheim)

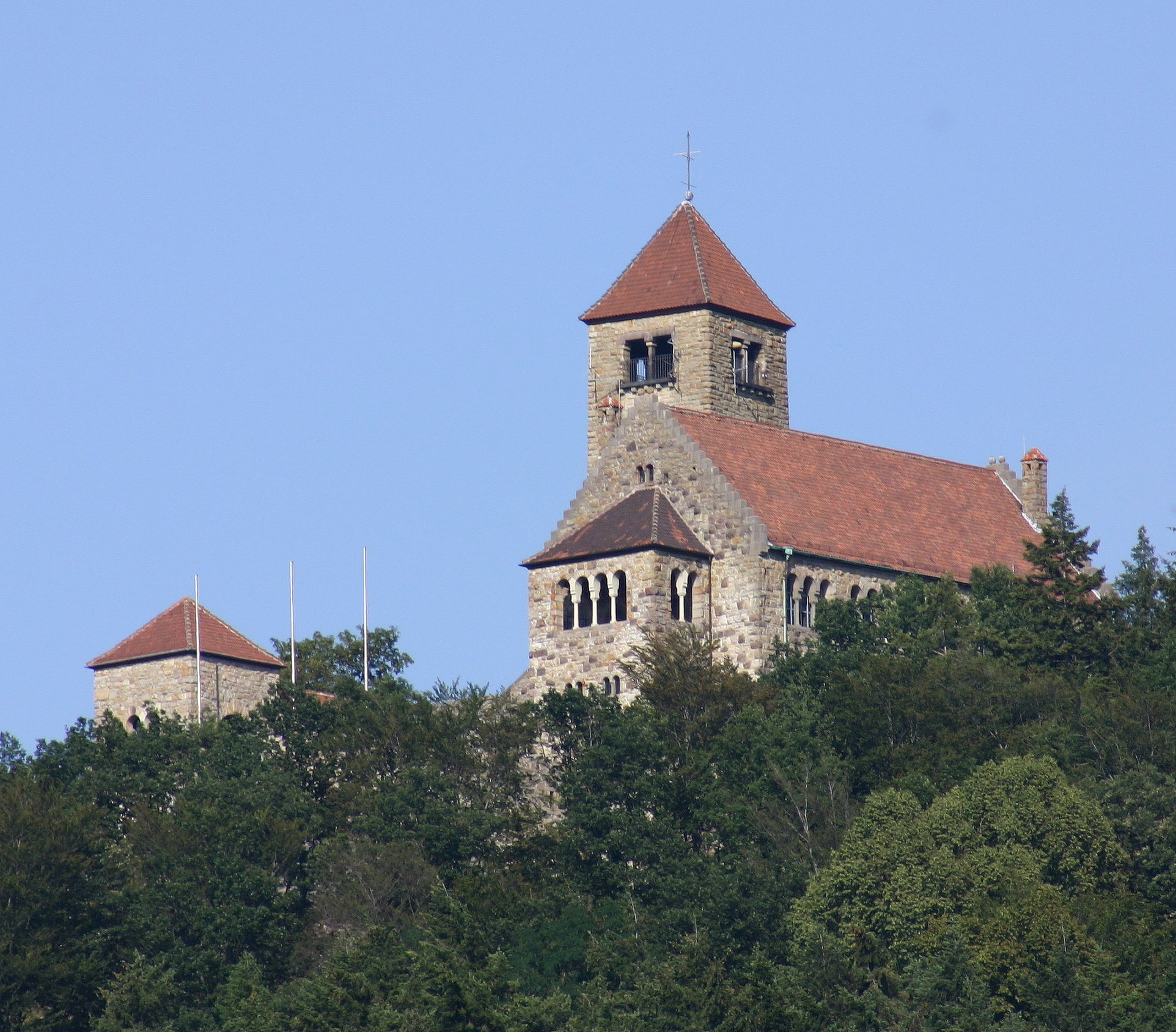
Wachenburg near Weinheim (Two-Castles-Town)

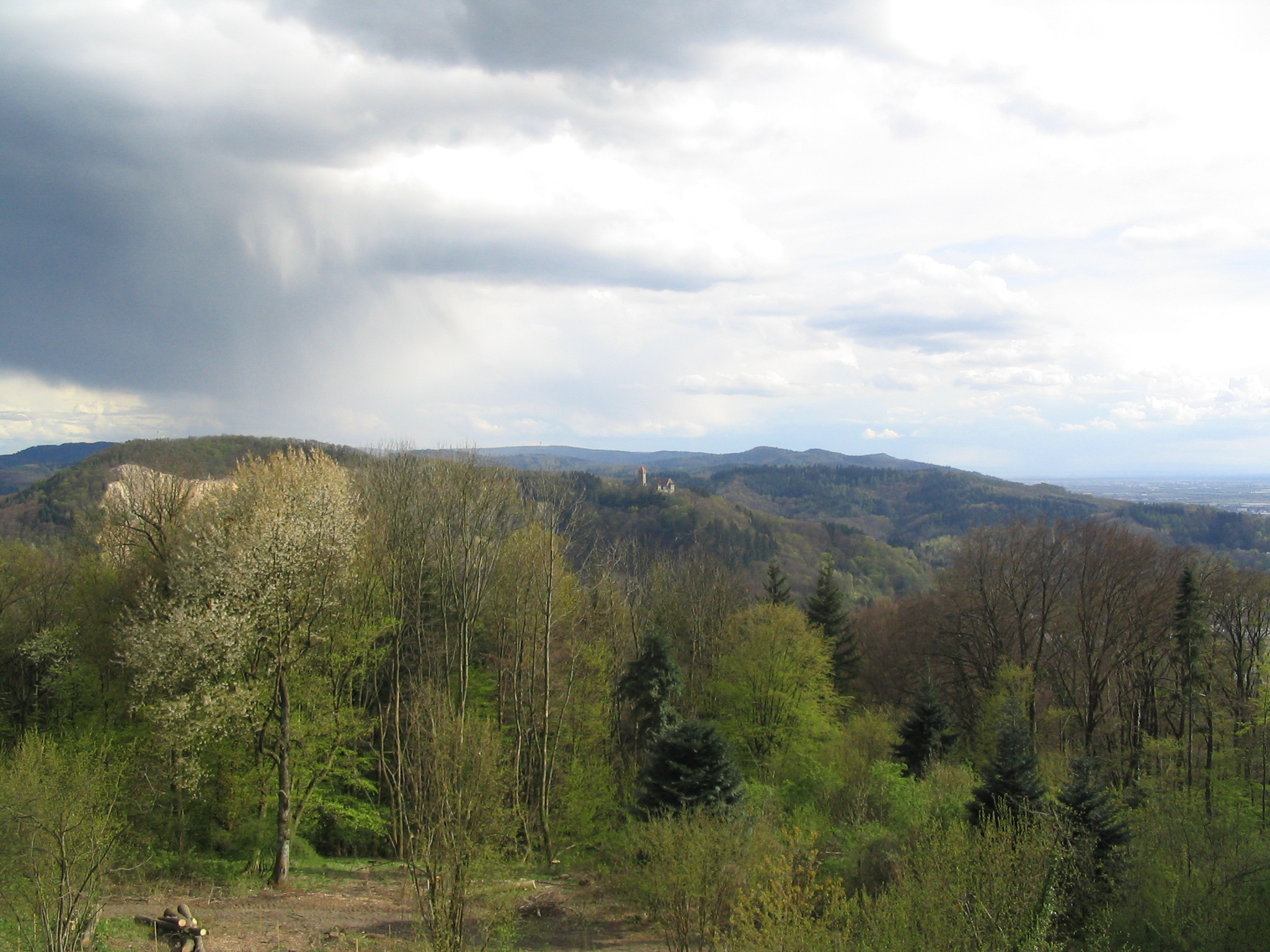
Wachenburg (view from Hirschkopf-tower), Weißer Stein (lookout tower) in the background

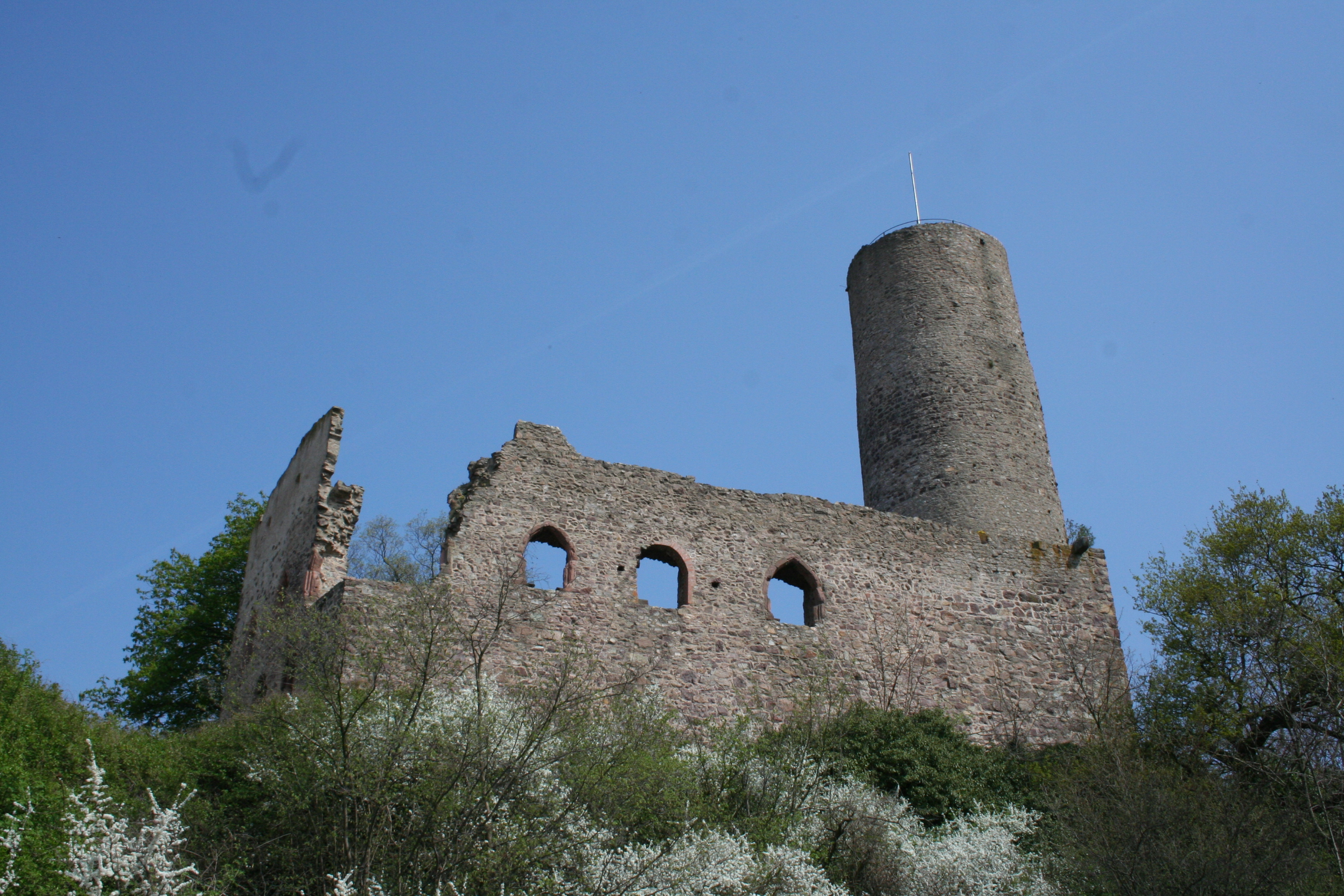
Strahlenburg near Schriesheim

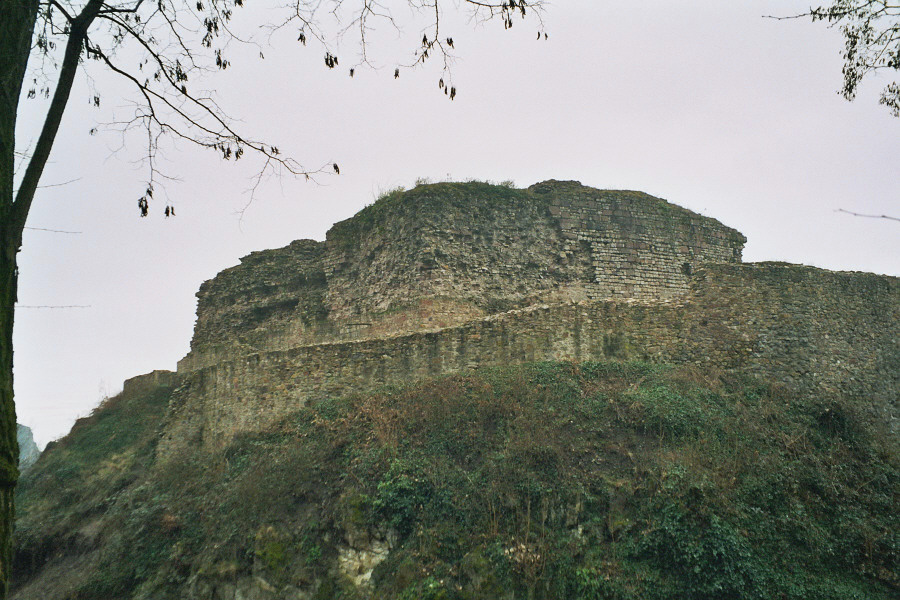
The ruins of Schauenburg in Dossenheim

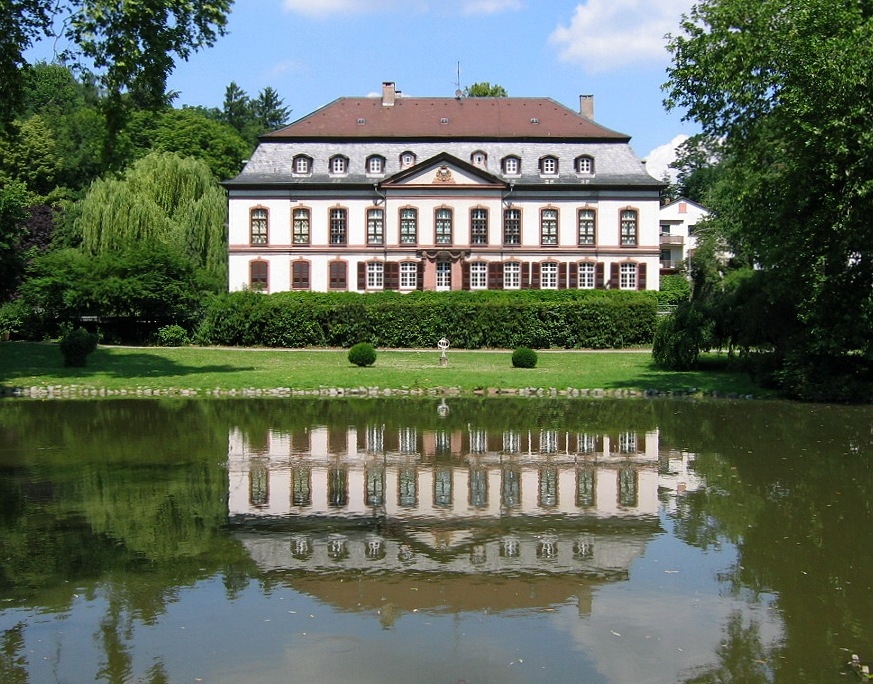
Birkenau Castle near Weinheim

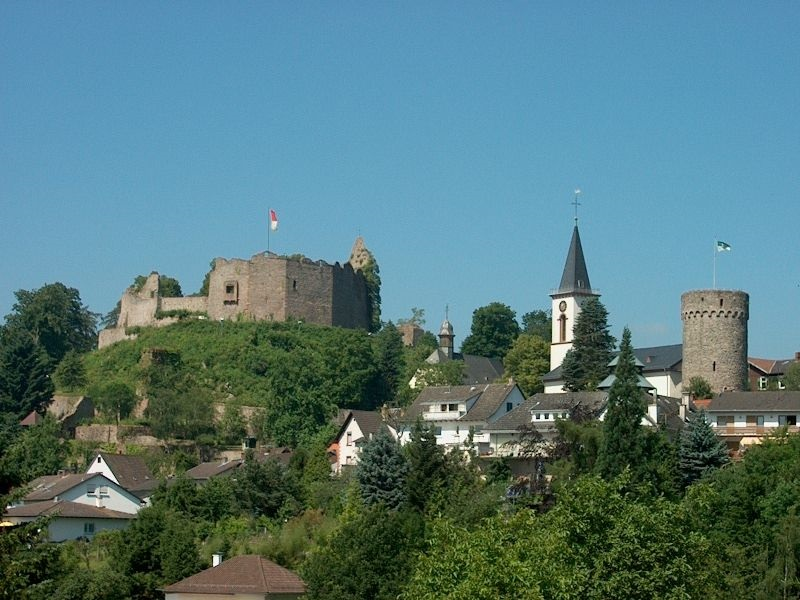
The ruins of Lindenfels Castle, Bürgerturm (tower)

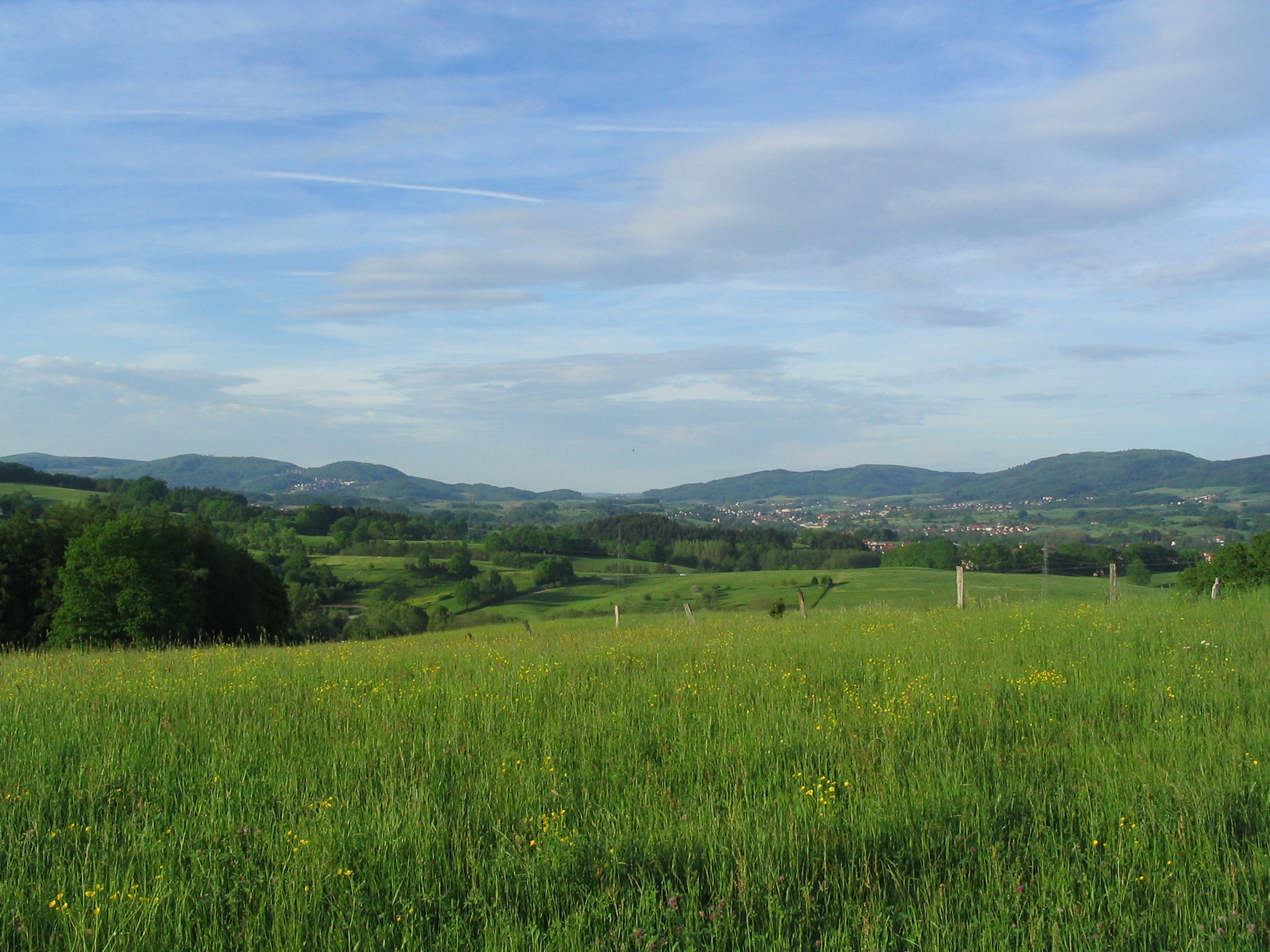
View from Weschnitztal to Lindenfels (left), in the background right of centre: Reichenberg Castle, left picture margin: Neunkircher Höhe

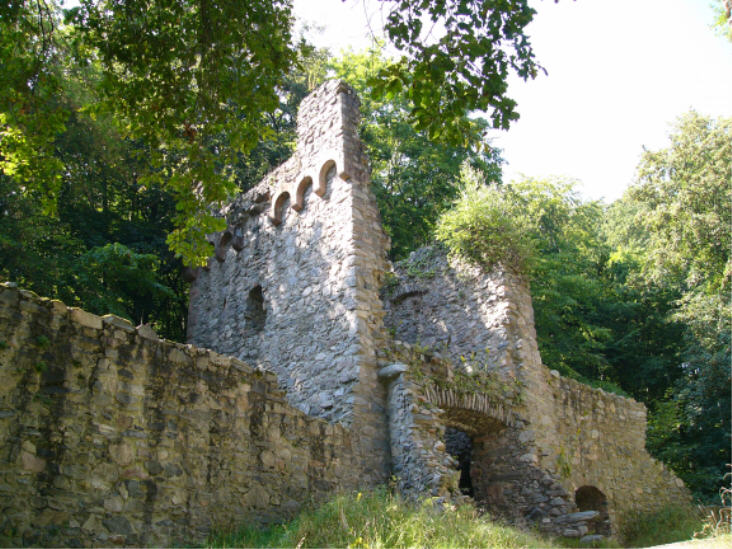
The ruins of Rodenstein near Fränkisch-Crumbach are the setting of a ghost story: Rodensteiner flies with a berserker-cornet in the night through the air to prophesy the start of a war (see above).

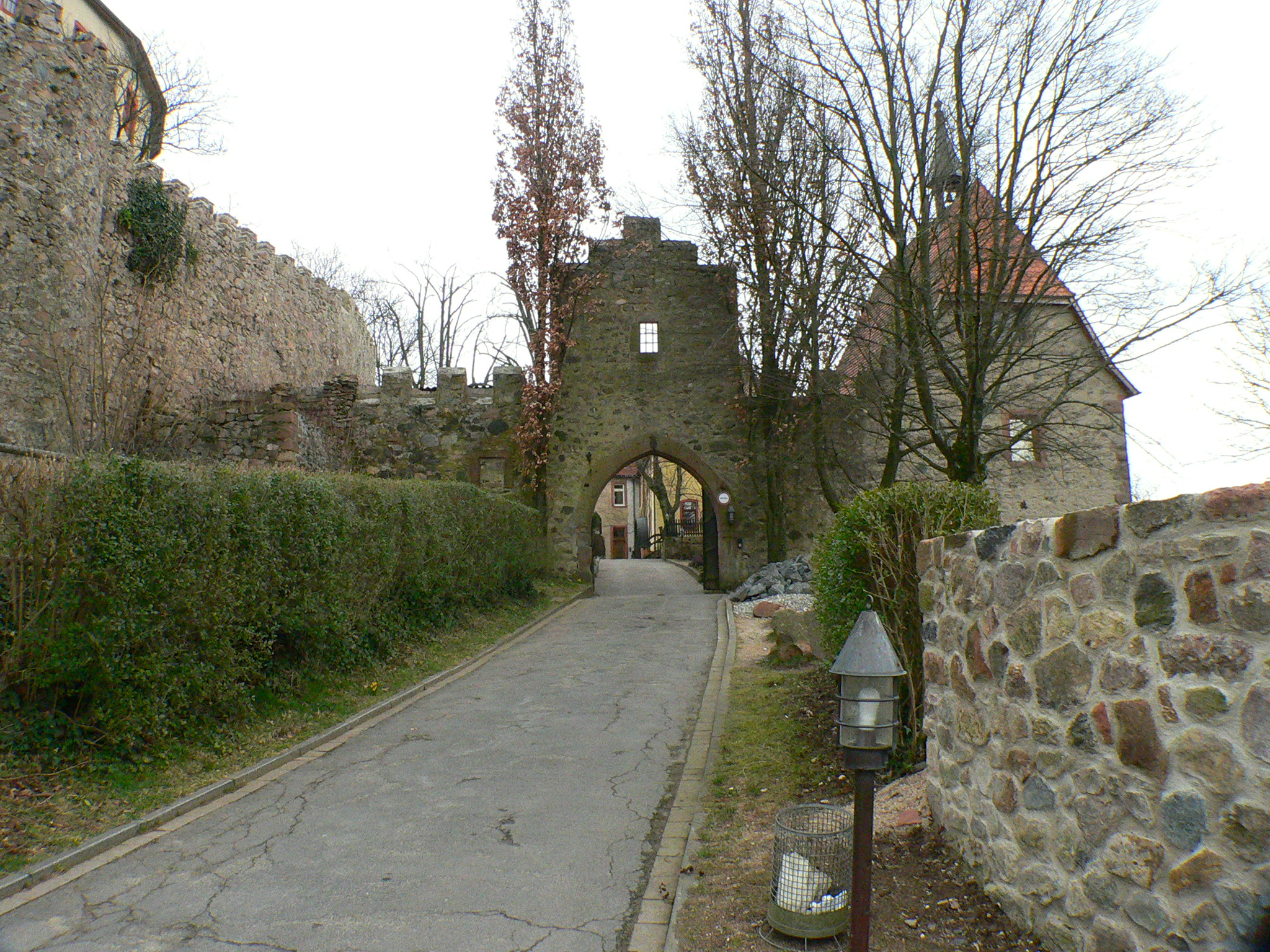
Reichenberg Castle, entrance, near Reichelsheim

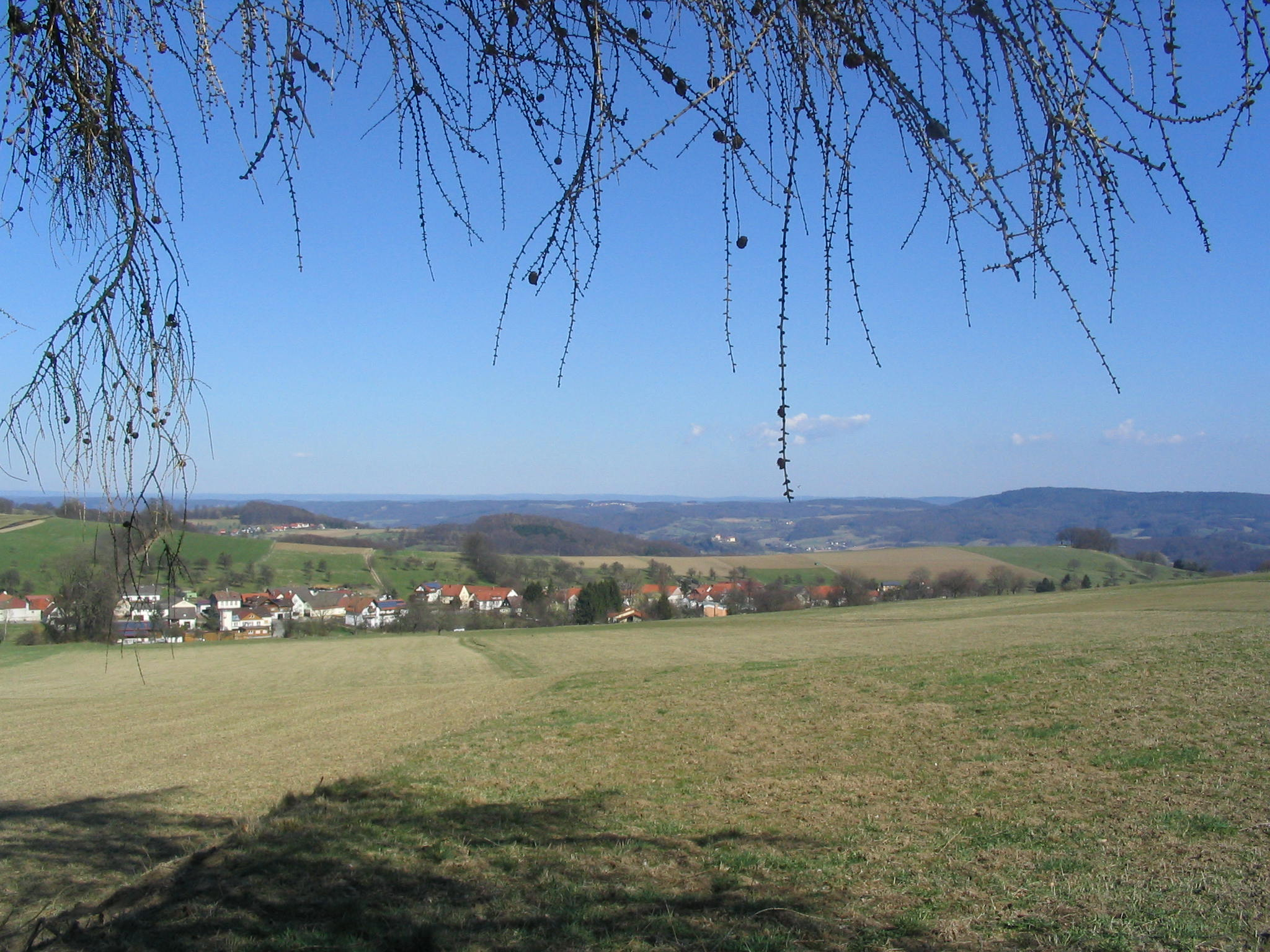
Gersprenz-Valley with Reichenberg

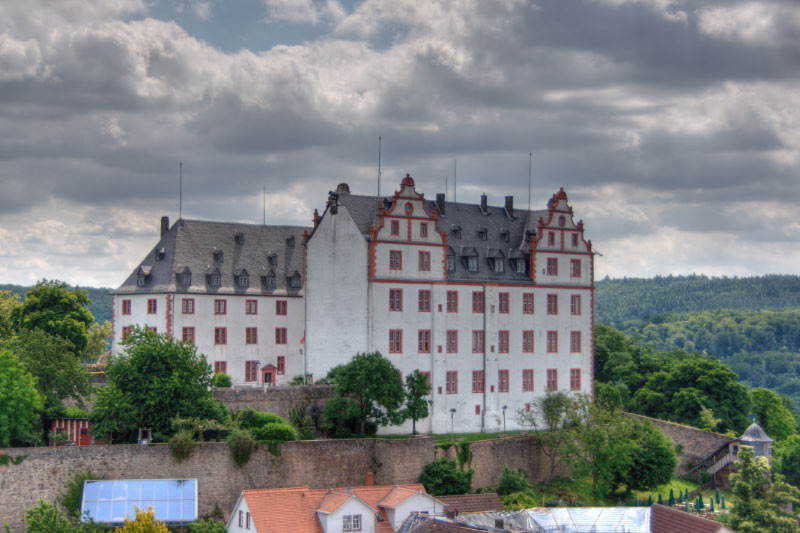
Lichtenberg Castle (Fischbachtal)

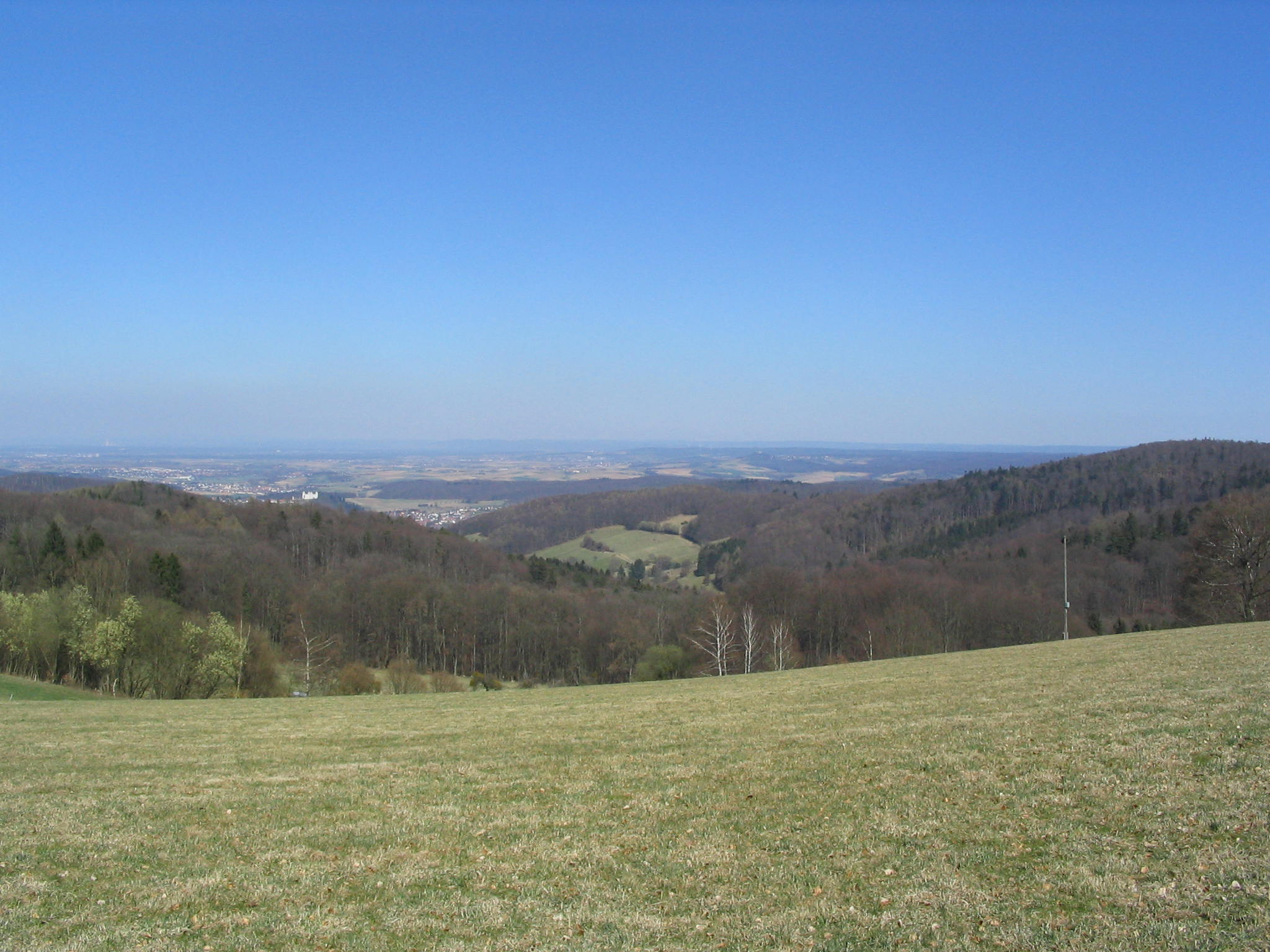
Neunkircher Höhe with a view to Lichtenberg Castle (left) and the Reinheimer Bucht: Otzberg to the right of centre

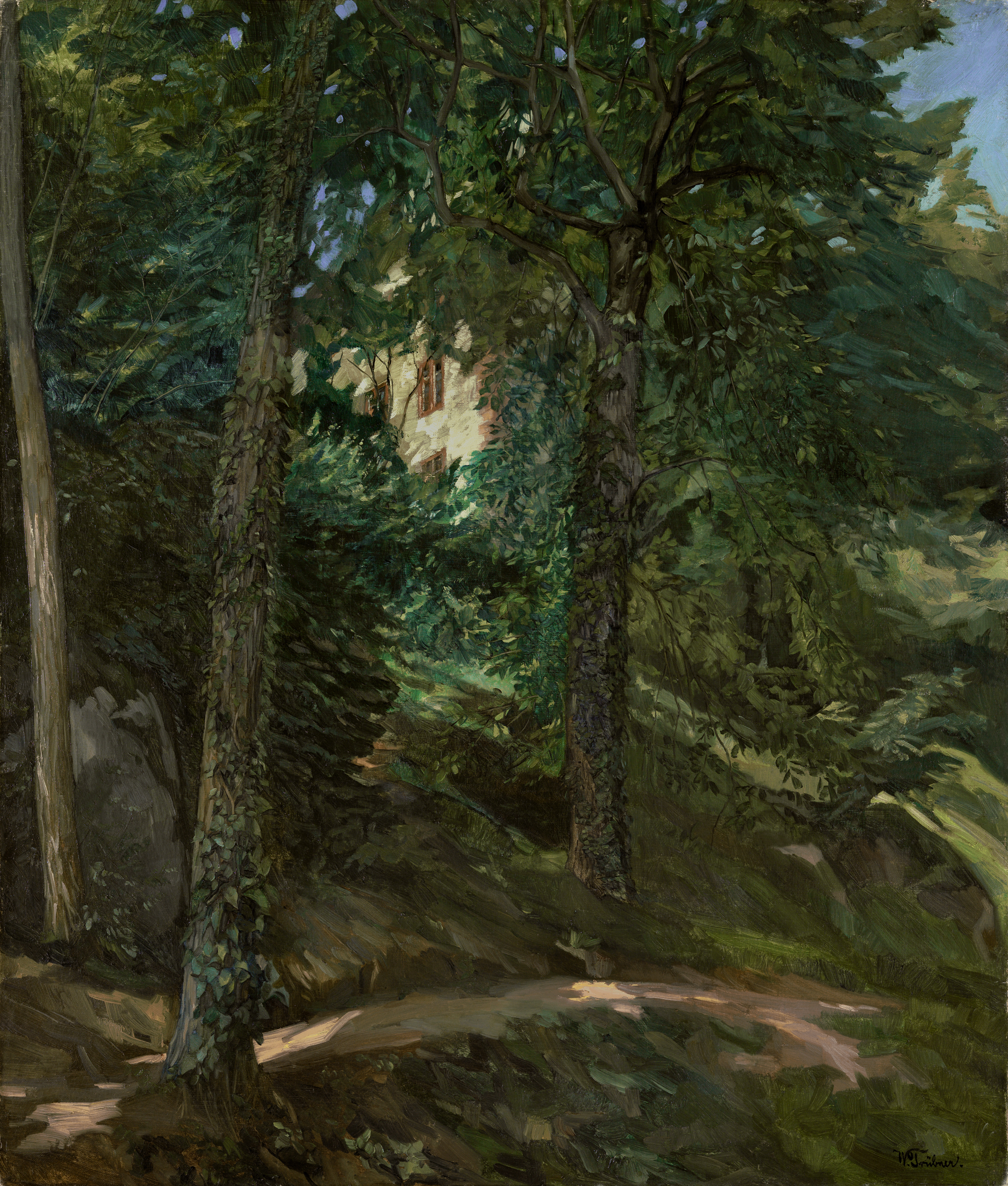
Castle Grounds in Lichtenberg in Odenwald, Wilhelm Trübner, 1900. Colección Carmen Thyssen Bornemisza.

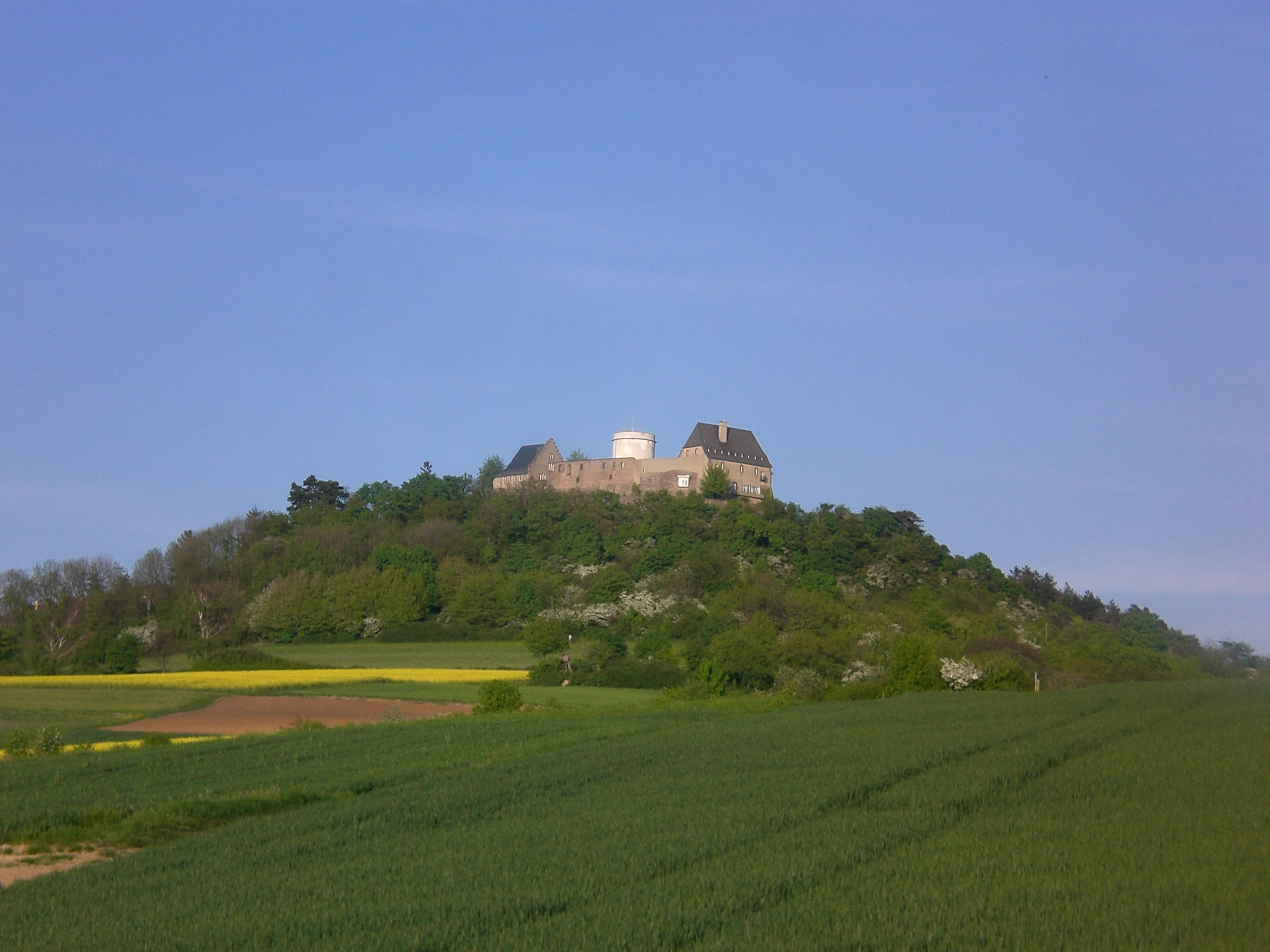
extinct volcano Otzberg and the old fort Veste Otzberg with the white tower

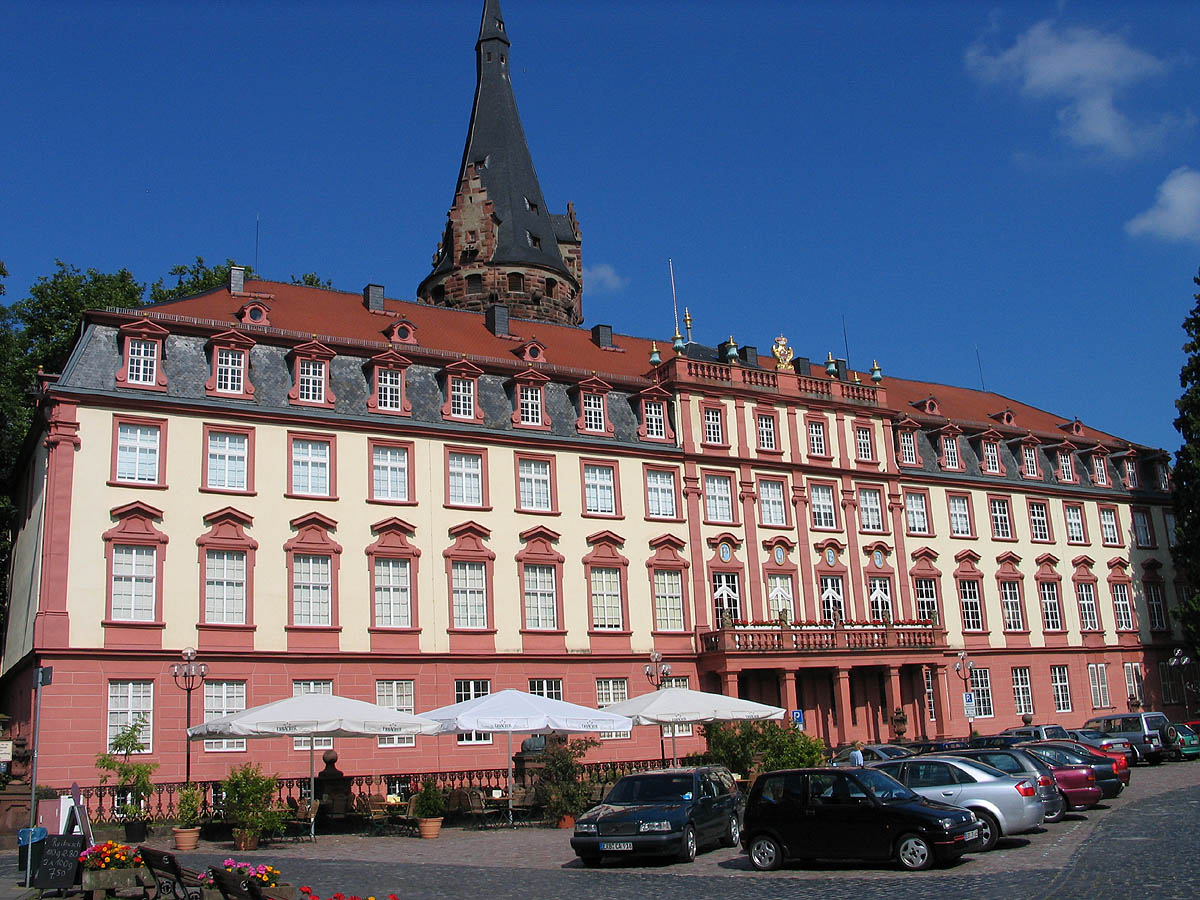
Erbach Castle

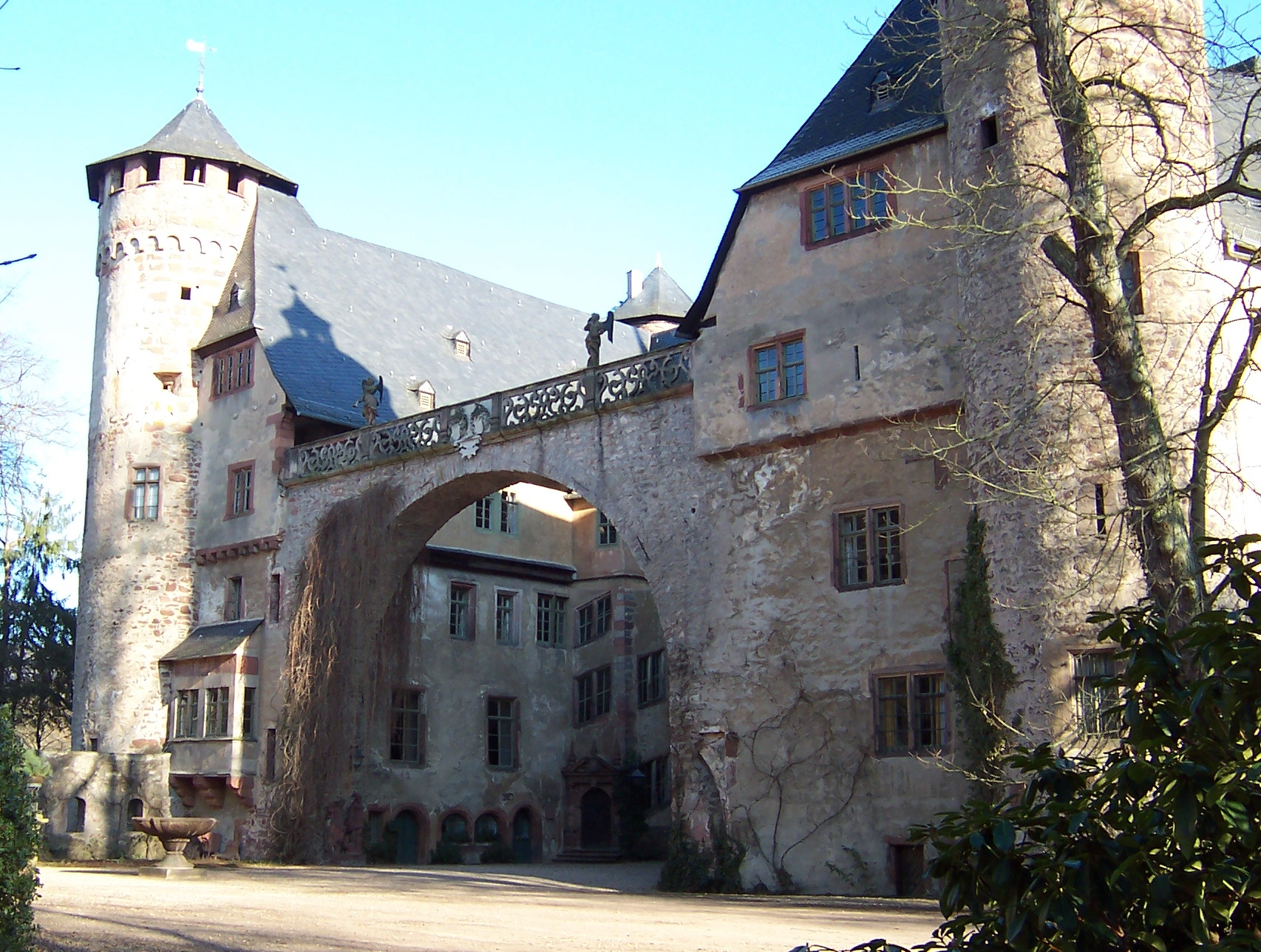
Fürstenau Castle (near Michelstadt) with decorative gateway arch

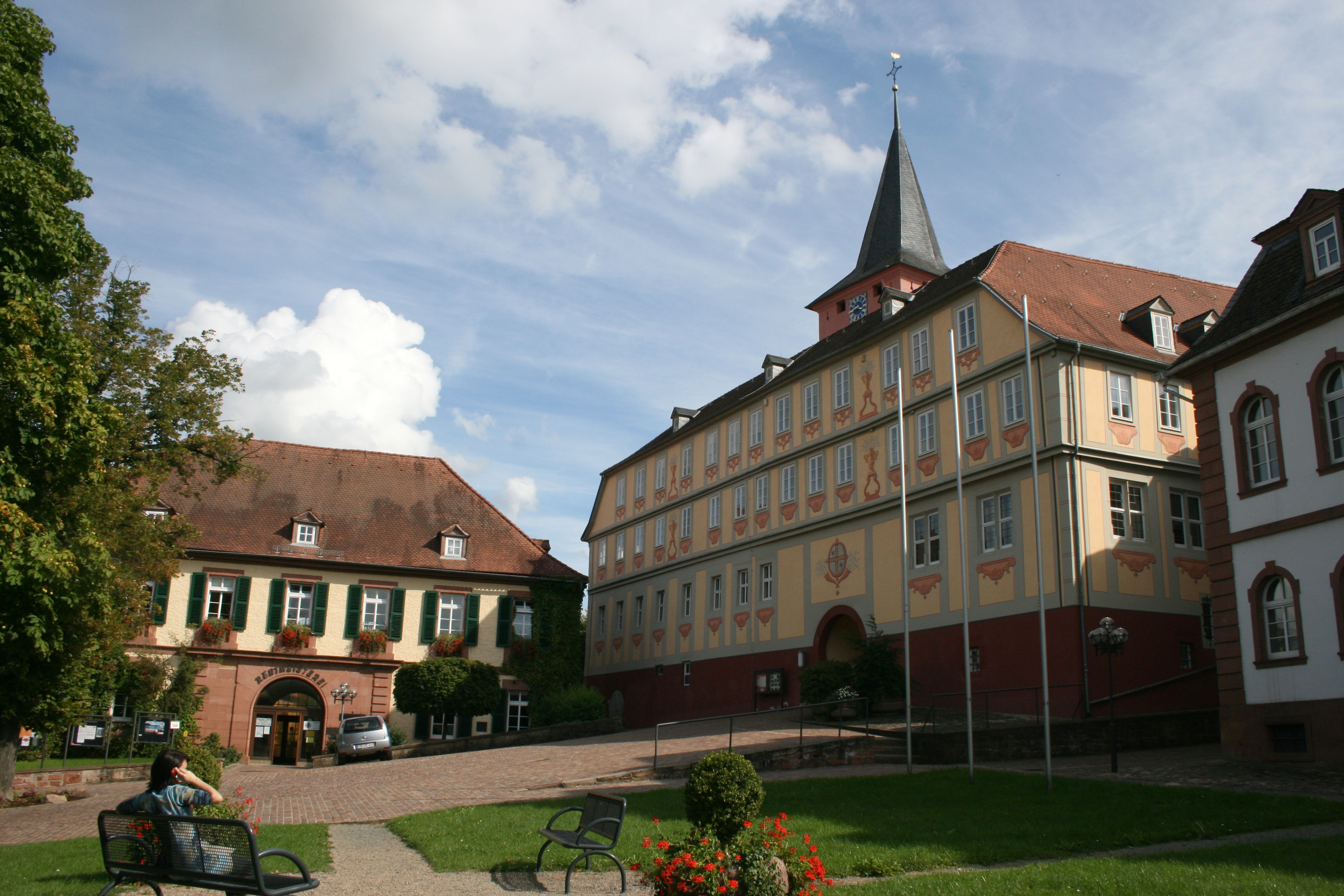
Old Castle in Bad König

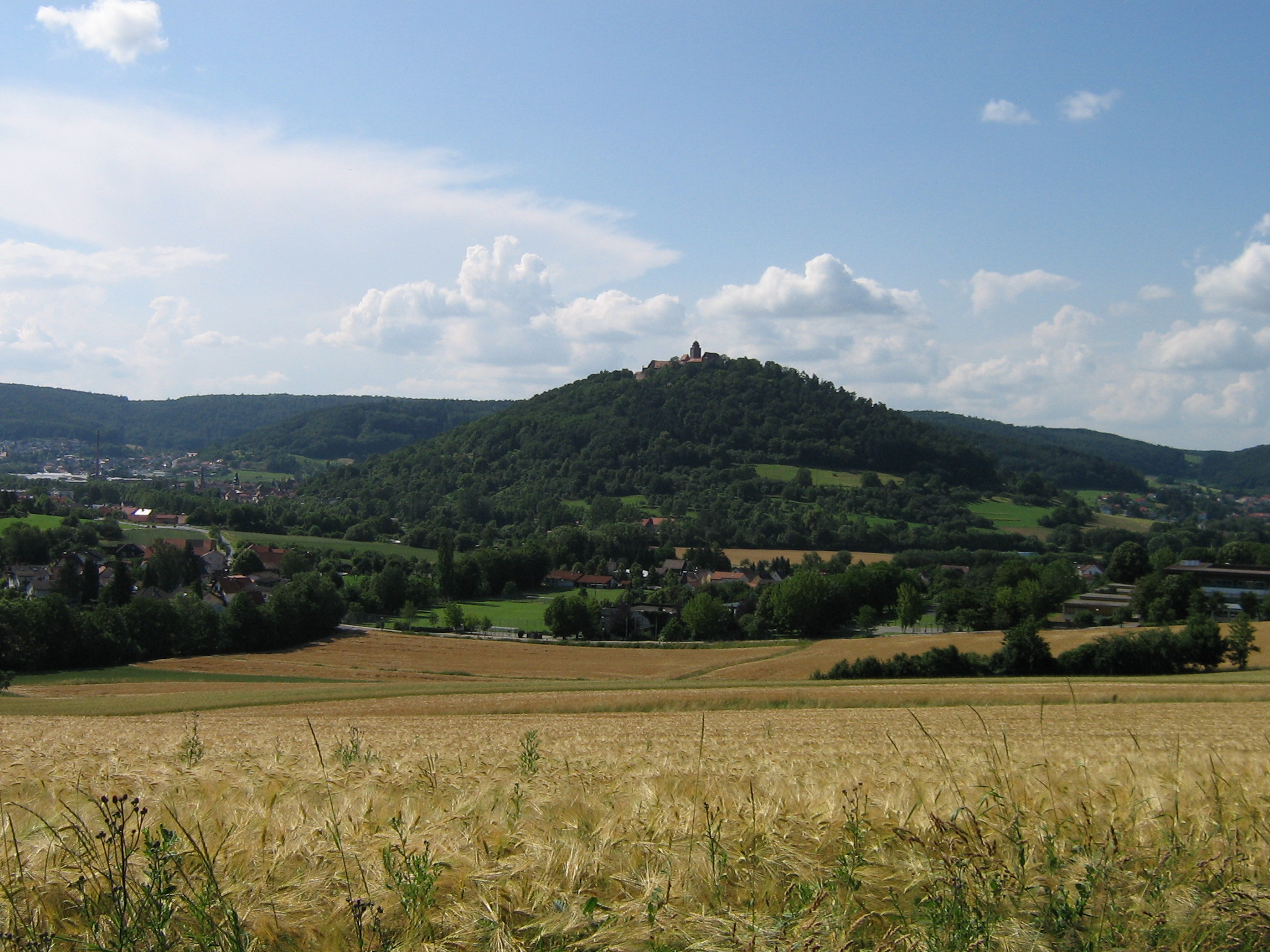
Burg Breuberg near Höchst in the summer of 2006

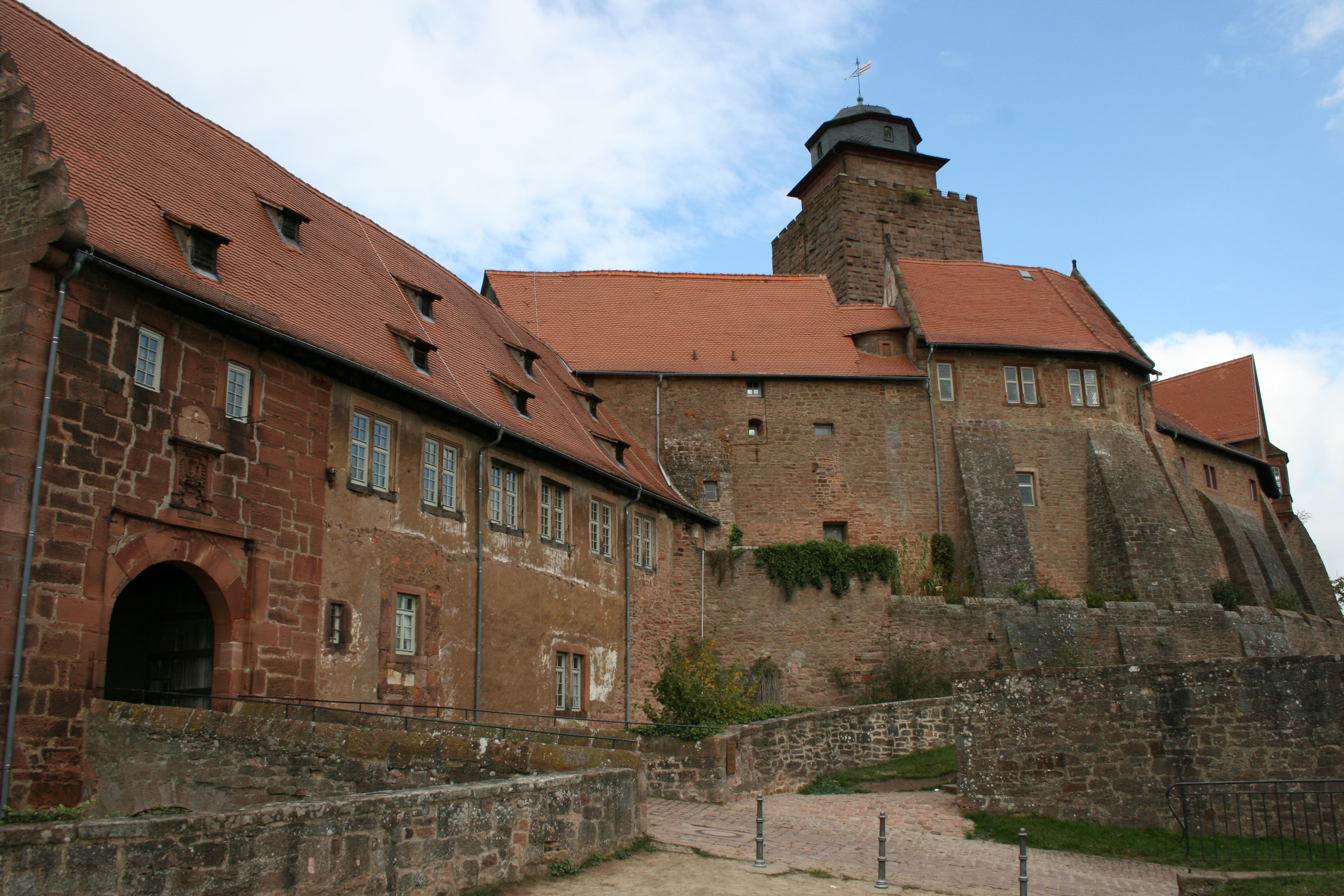
Breuberg Castle, keep (Bergfried) and main gate

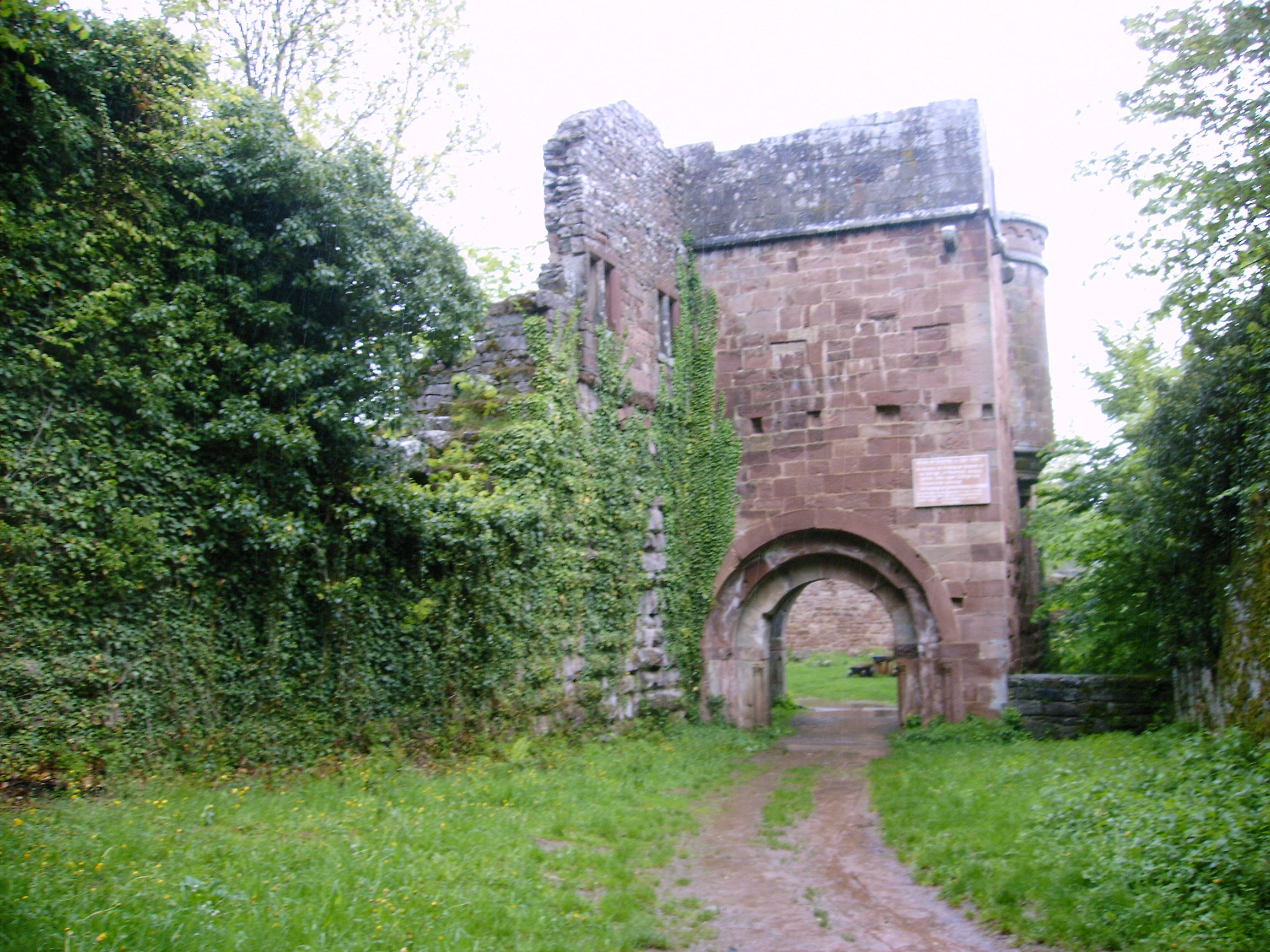
The ruins of Wildenberg (Kirchzell) from the High Middle Ages, built in the Staufer era, where Wolfram von Eschenbach is said to have written parts of his Parzival.

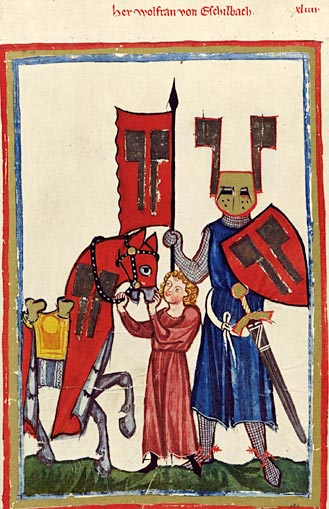
Portrait of the medieval poet Wolfram von Eschenbach from the Codex Manesse

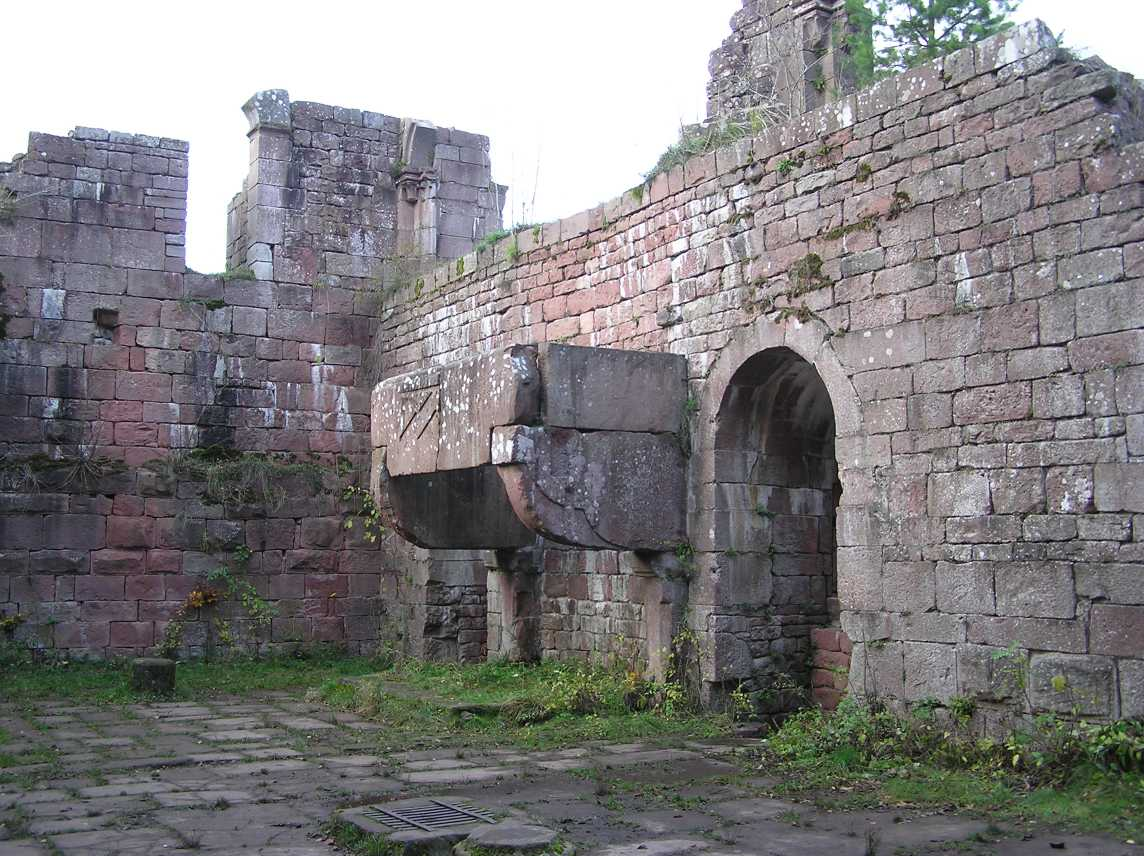
Fireplace in the great hall. In Wolframs Parzival the author indirectly compares the gigantic fireplace in the Grail Castle with that of Wildenberg: “so groziu fiwer sit noch e sach niemen hie ze Wildenberc” (line 230,12-13)

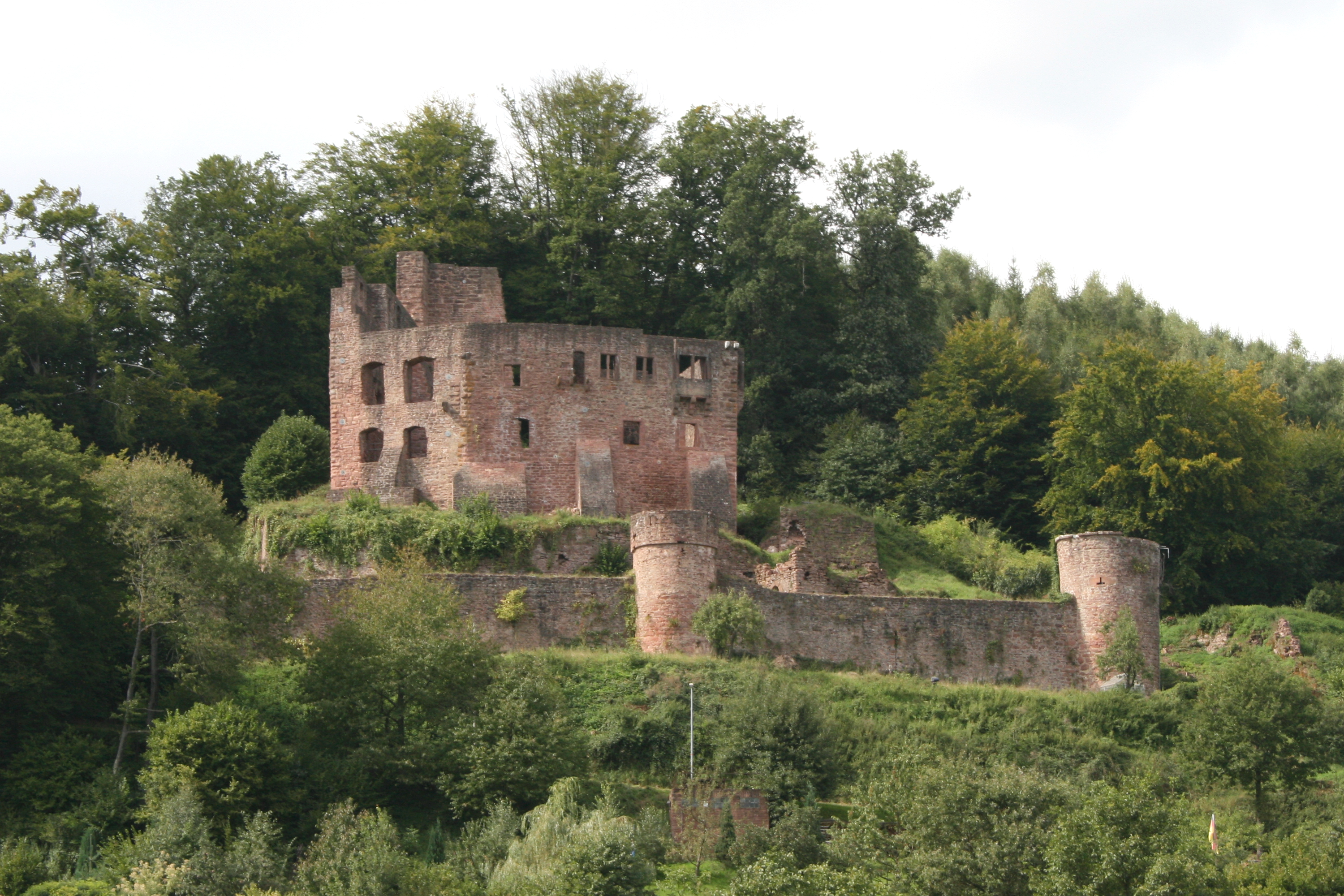
The ruins of Freienstein near Beerfelden

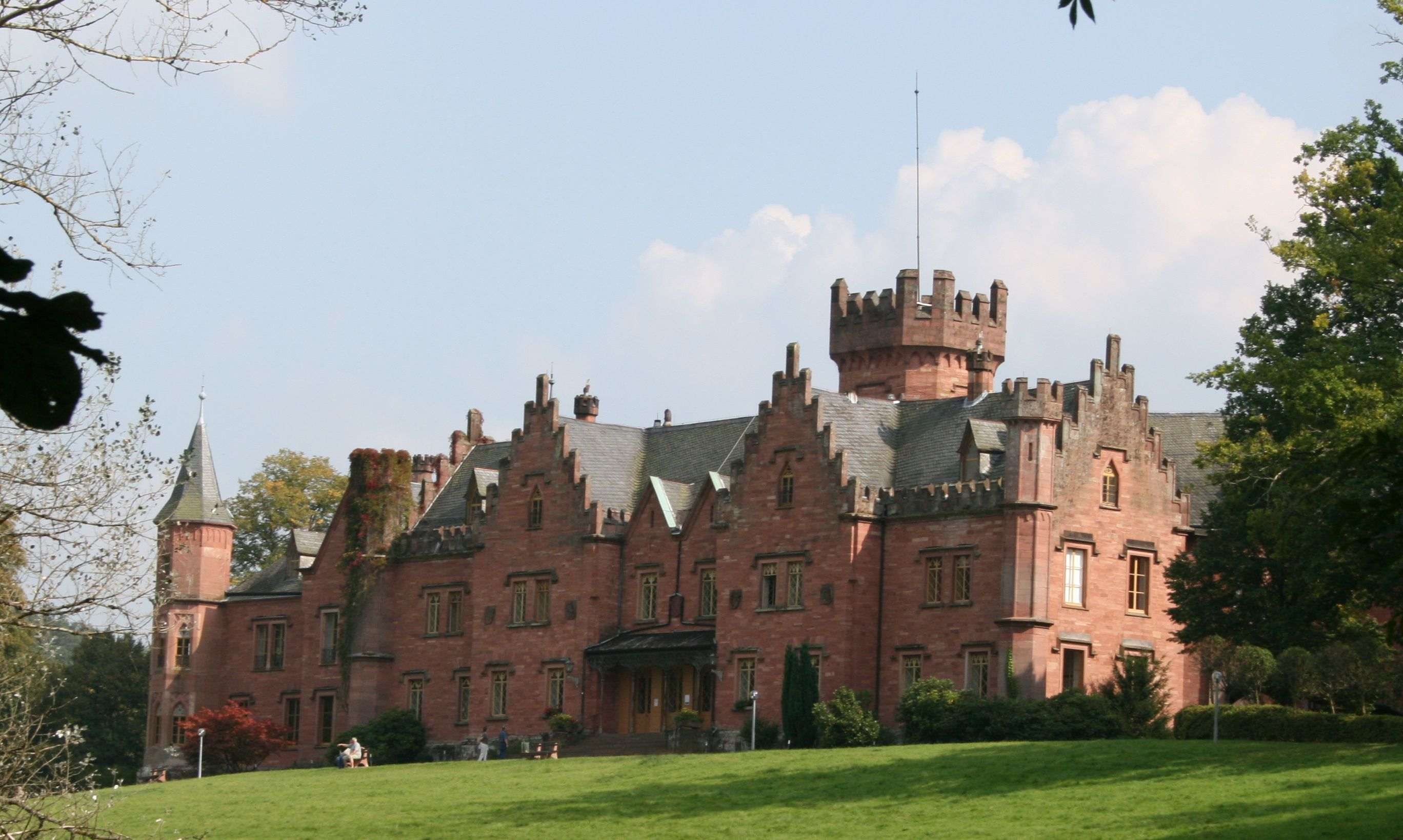
Waldleiningen Castle in the British-style (near Mudau)

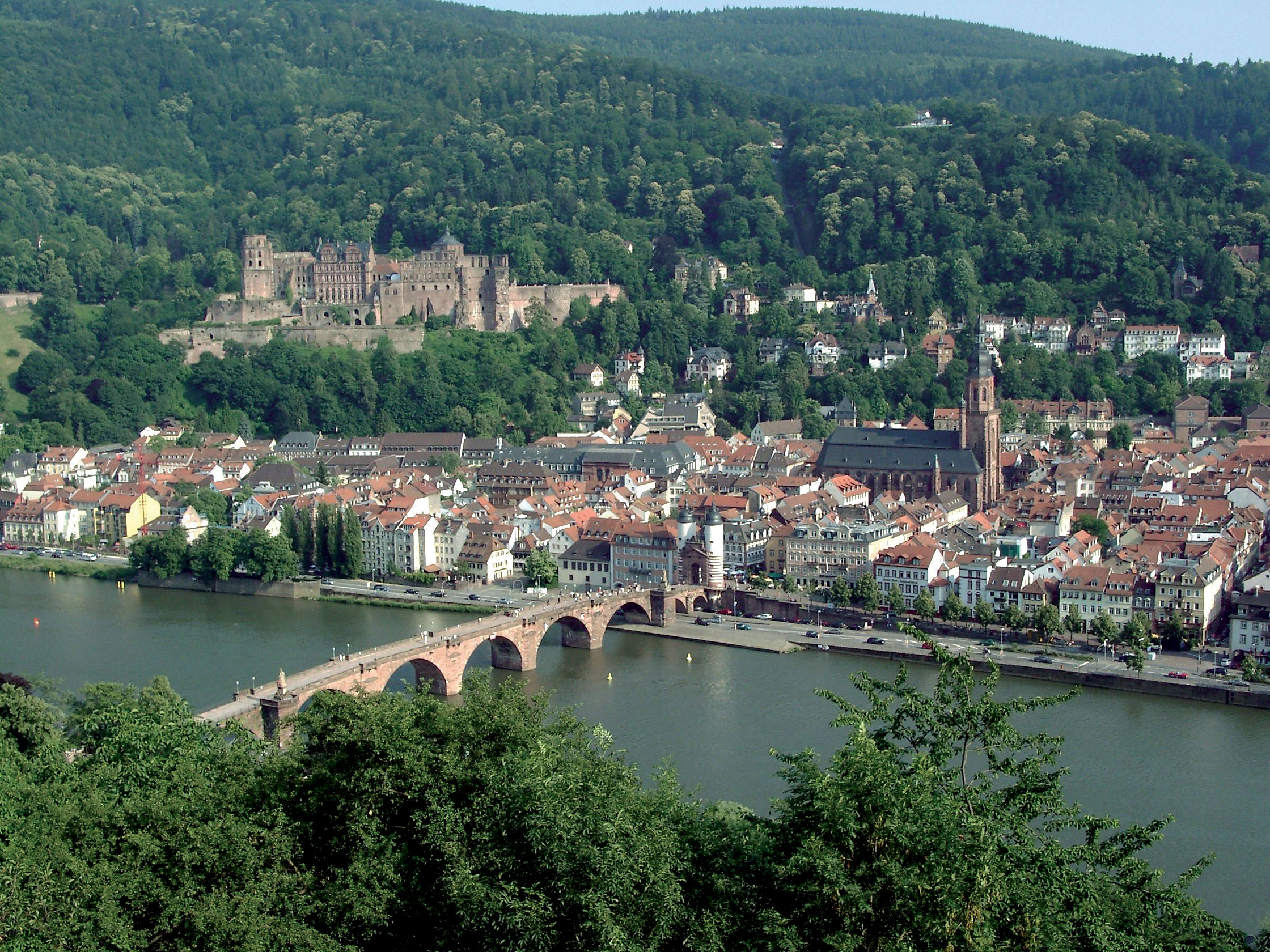
Heidelberg with Castle and the Old Bridge over river Neckar

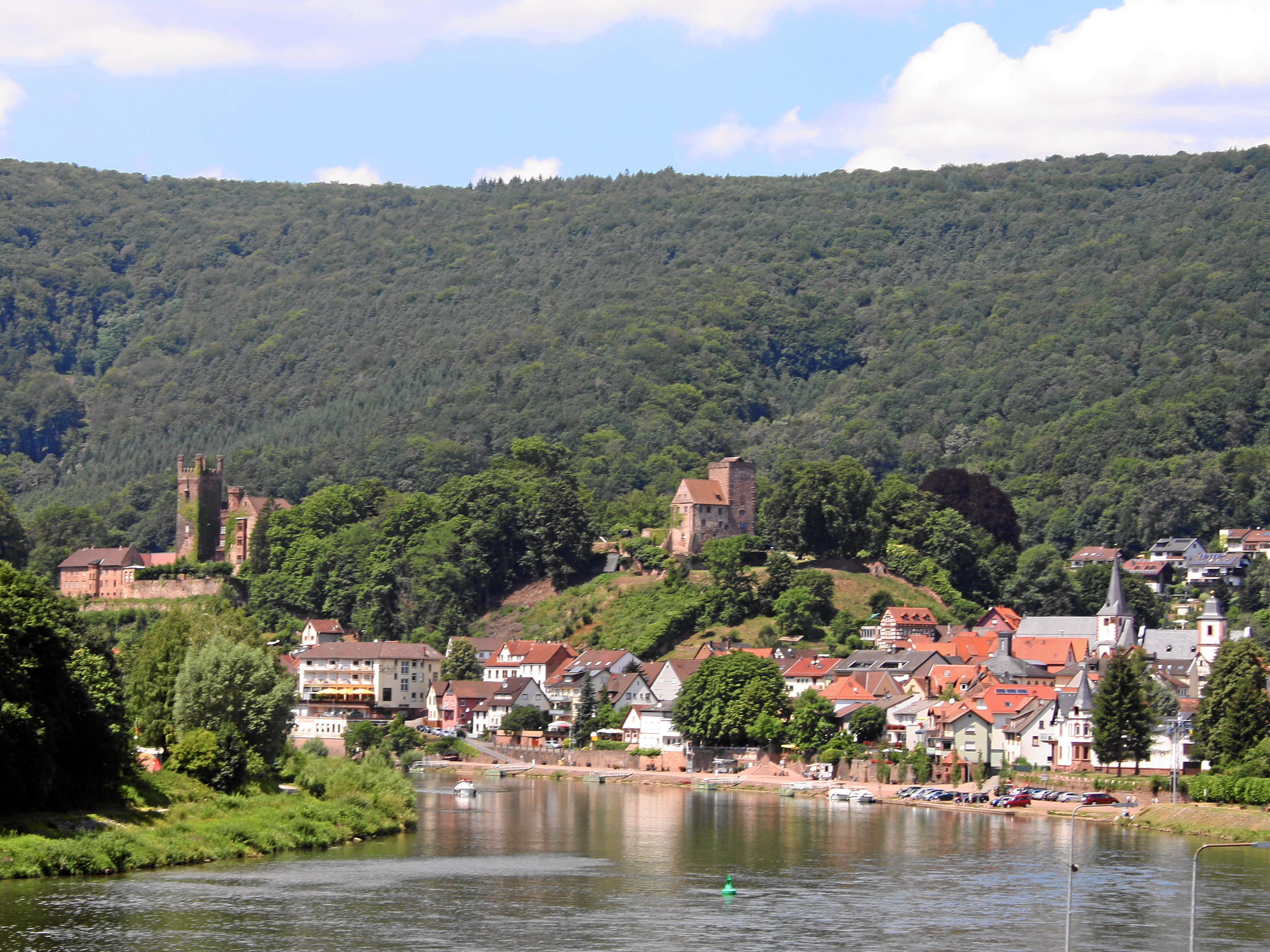
Neckarsteinach with Mittelburg (left) and Vorderburg (in the middle)

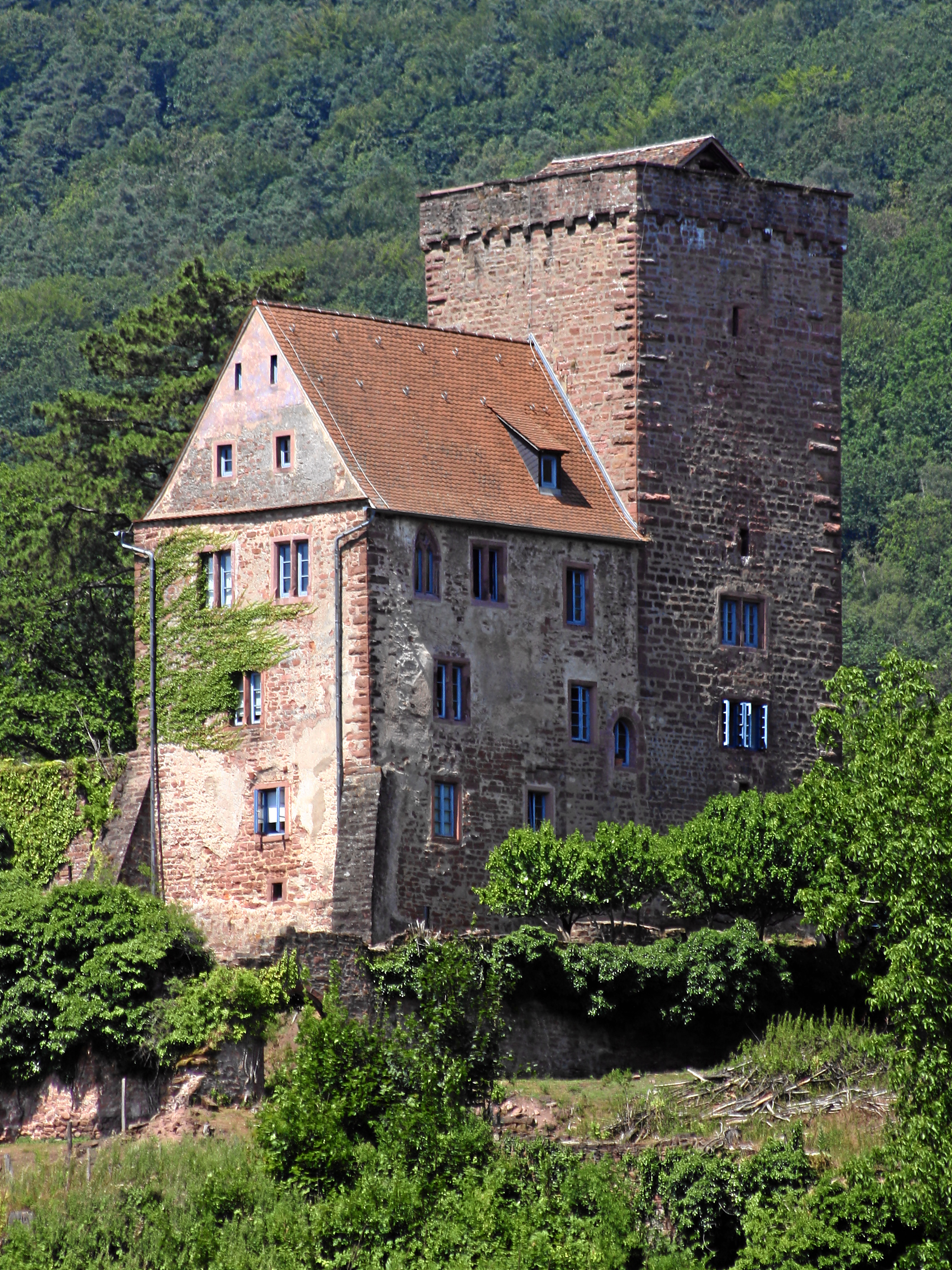
Neckarsteinach: Vorderburg

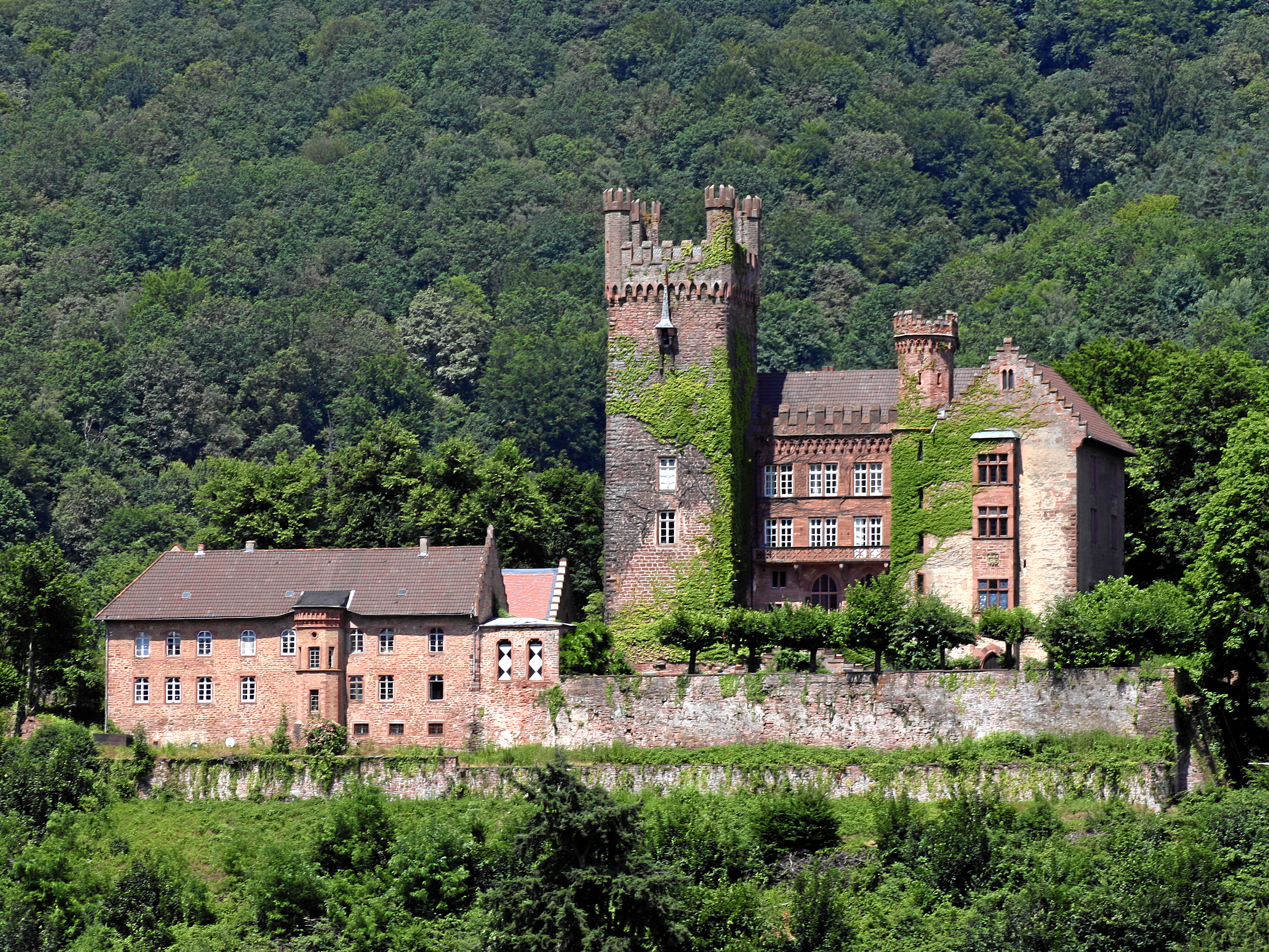
Neckarsteinach: Mittelburg

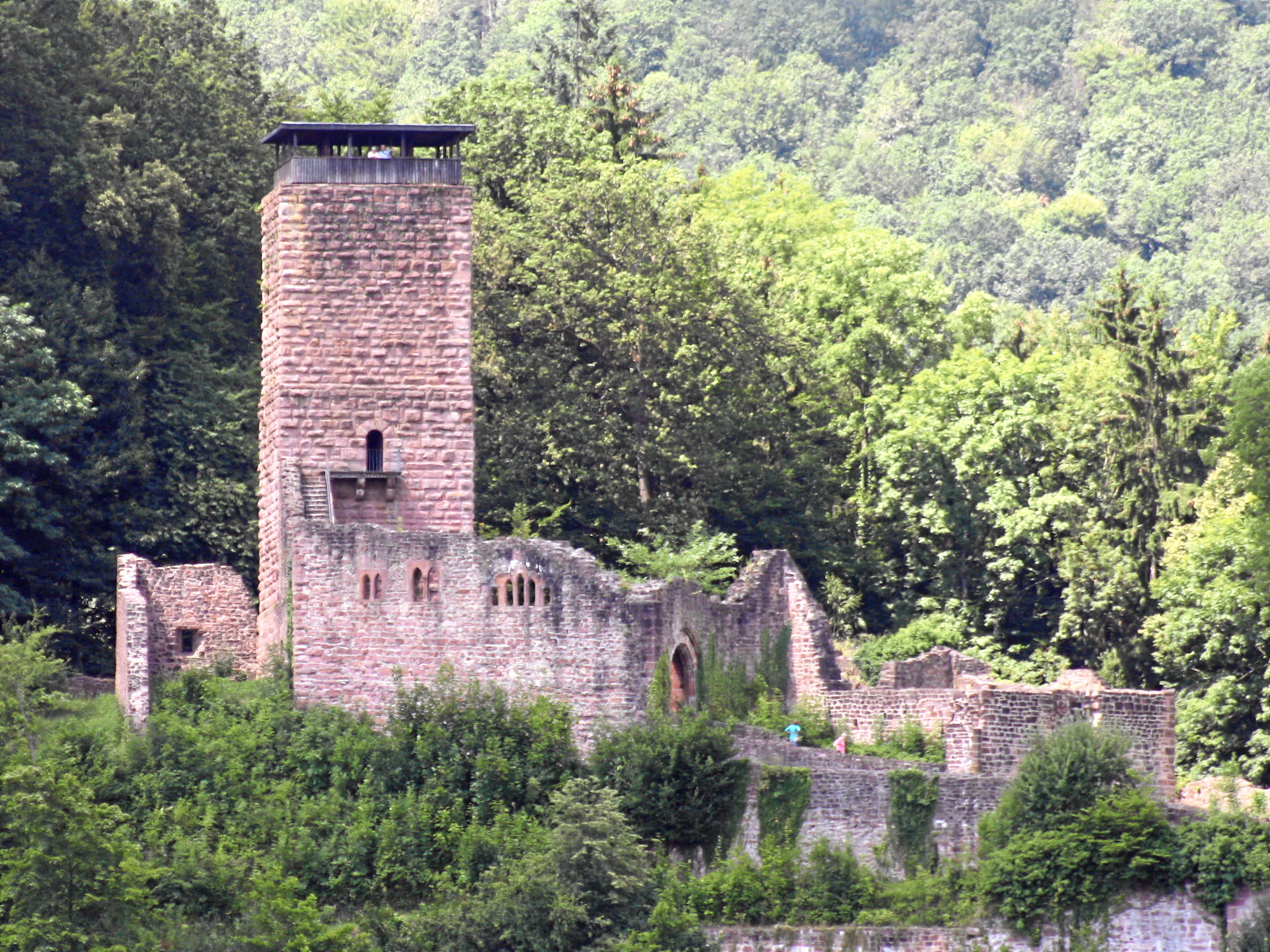
Neckarsteinach: Hinterburg

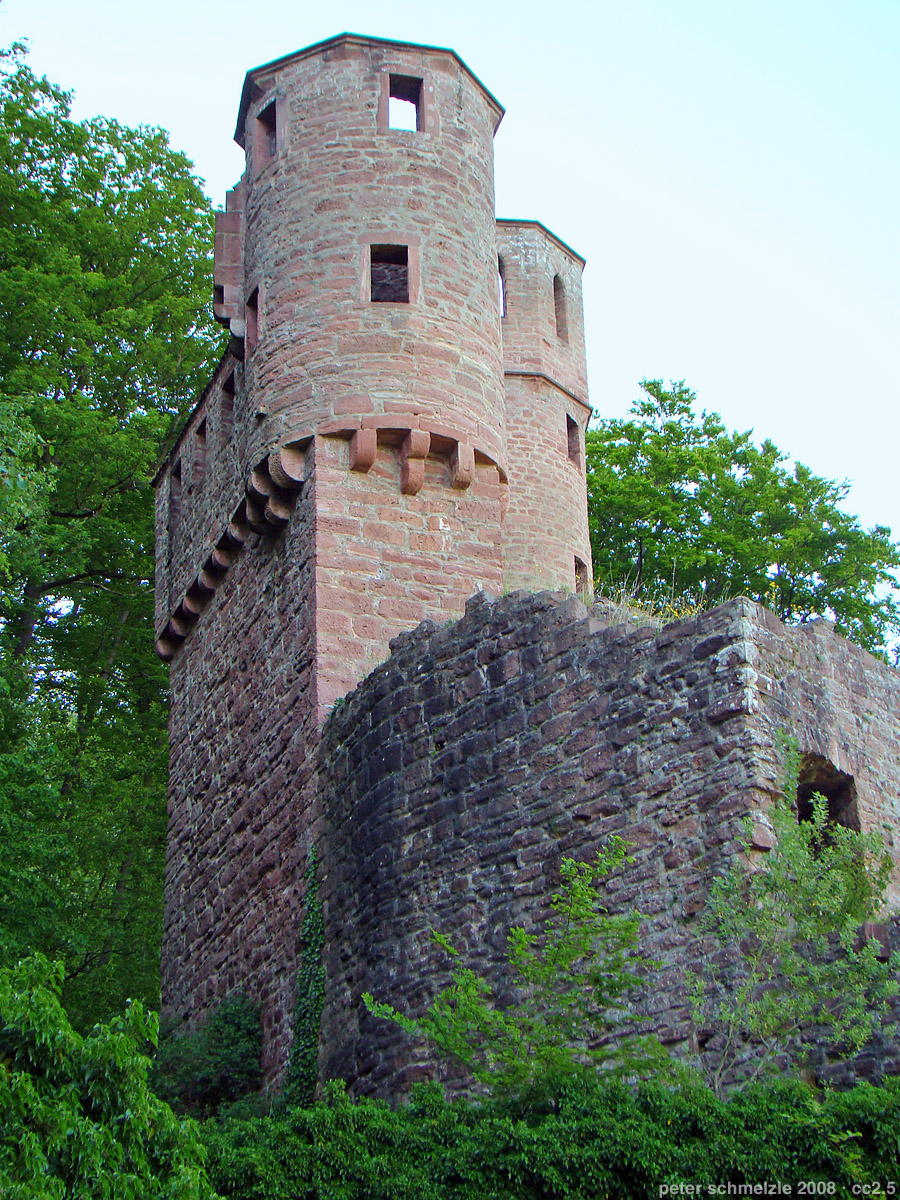
Neckarsteinach: The ruins of Schwalbennest

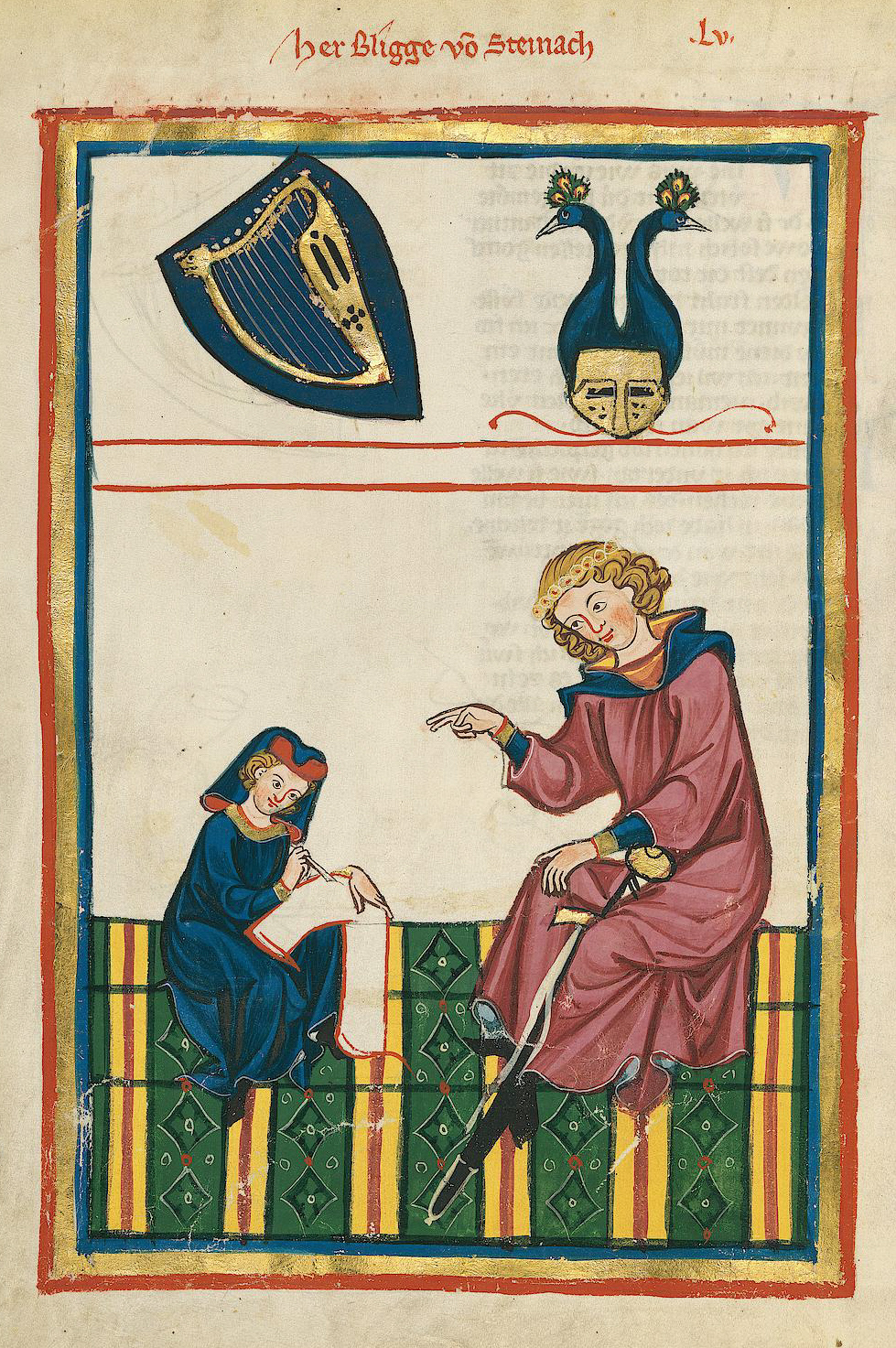
The medieval feudal lord and poet (minnesinger) Bligger von Steinach (Portrait from the Codex Manesse) resided in Steinach (Neckarsteinach)

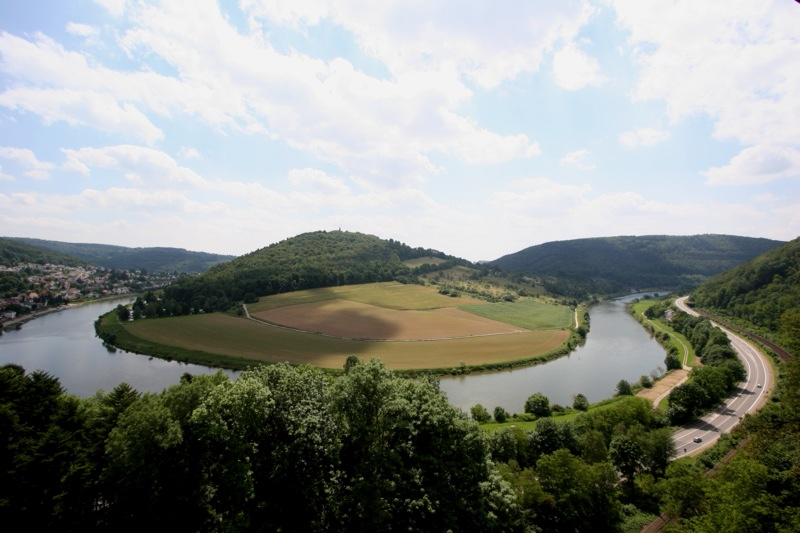
Dilsberg with mountain fort

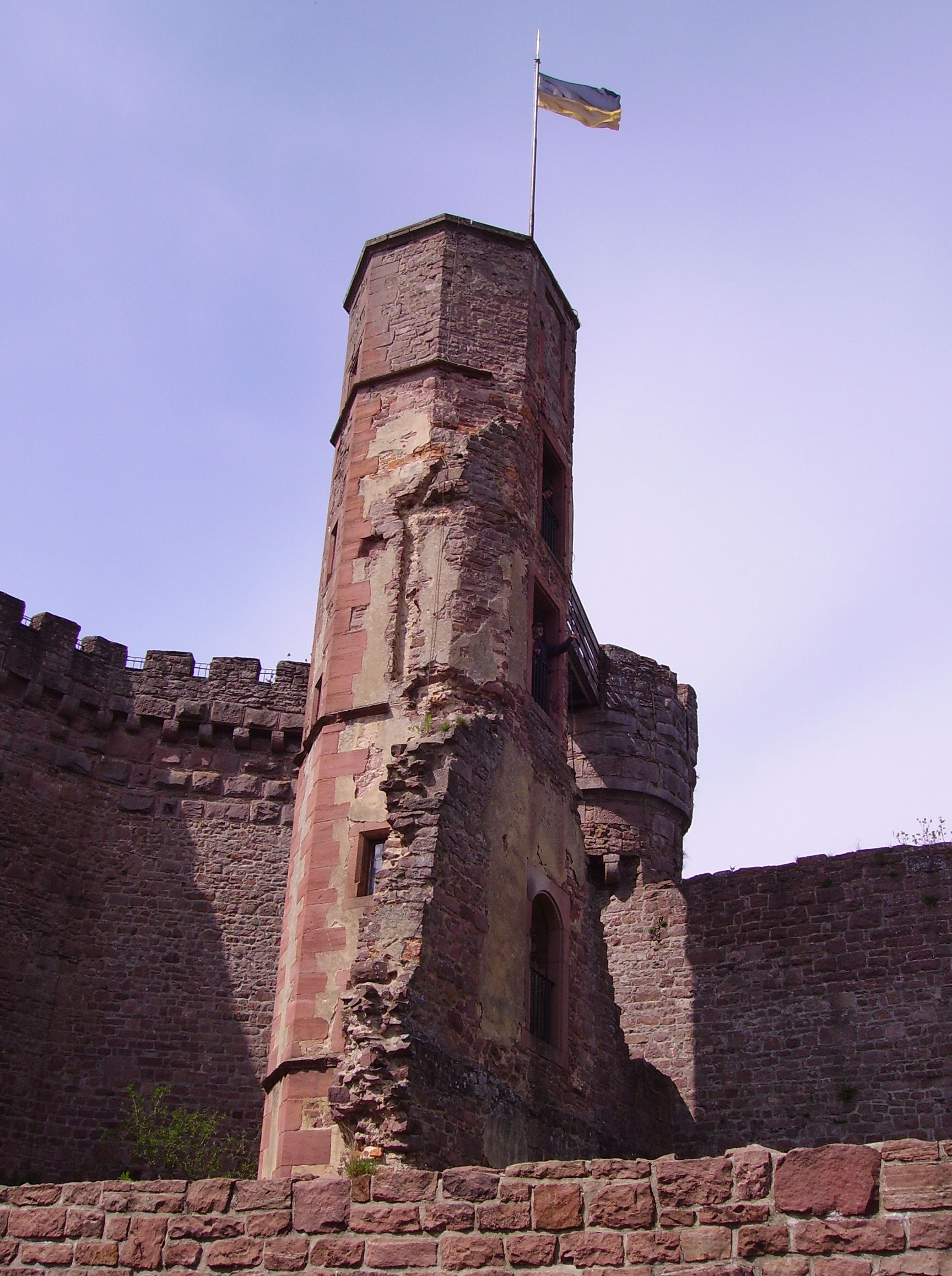
Tower and wall of Dilsberg near Neckarsteinach

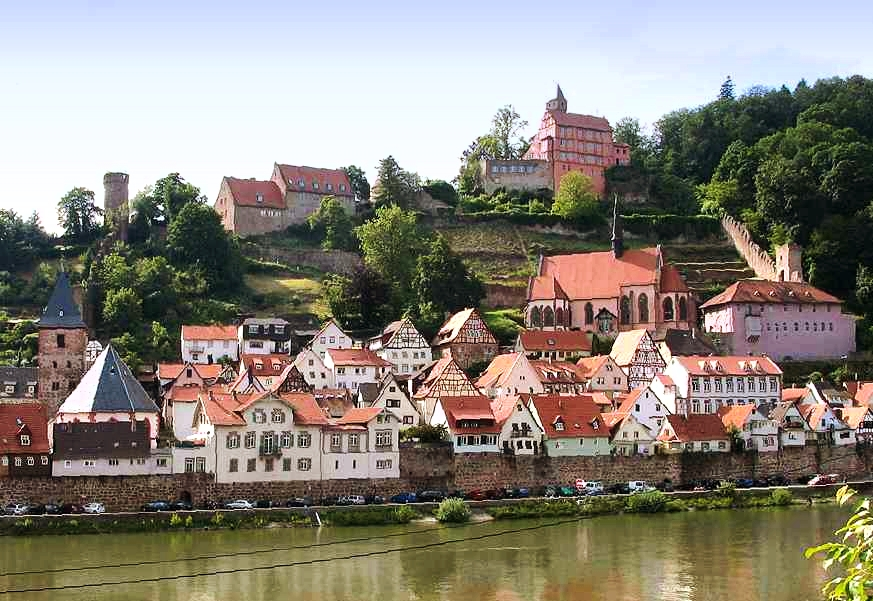
Hirschhorn with Hirschhorn Castle

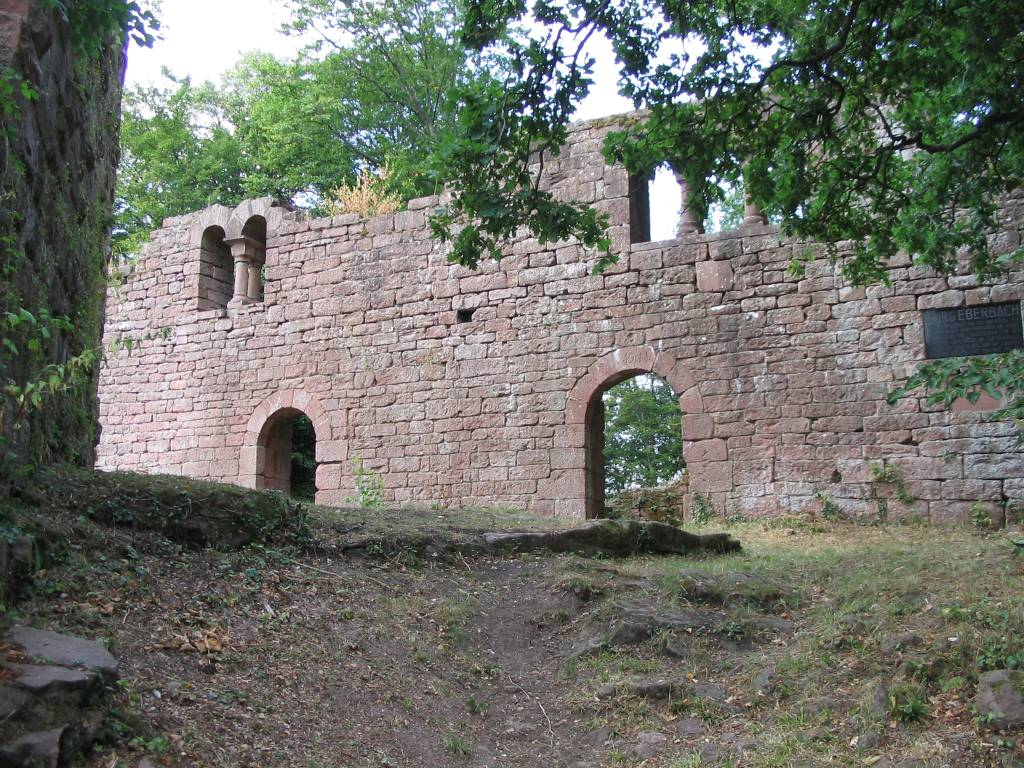
The ruins of Eberbach Castle

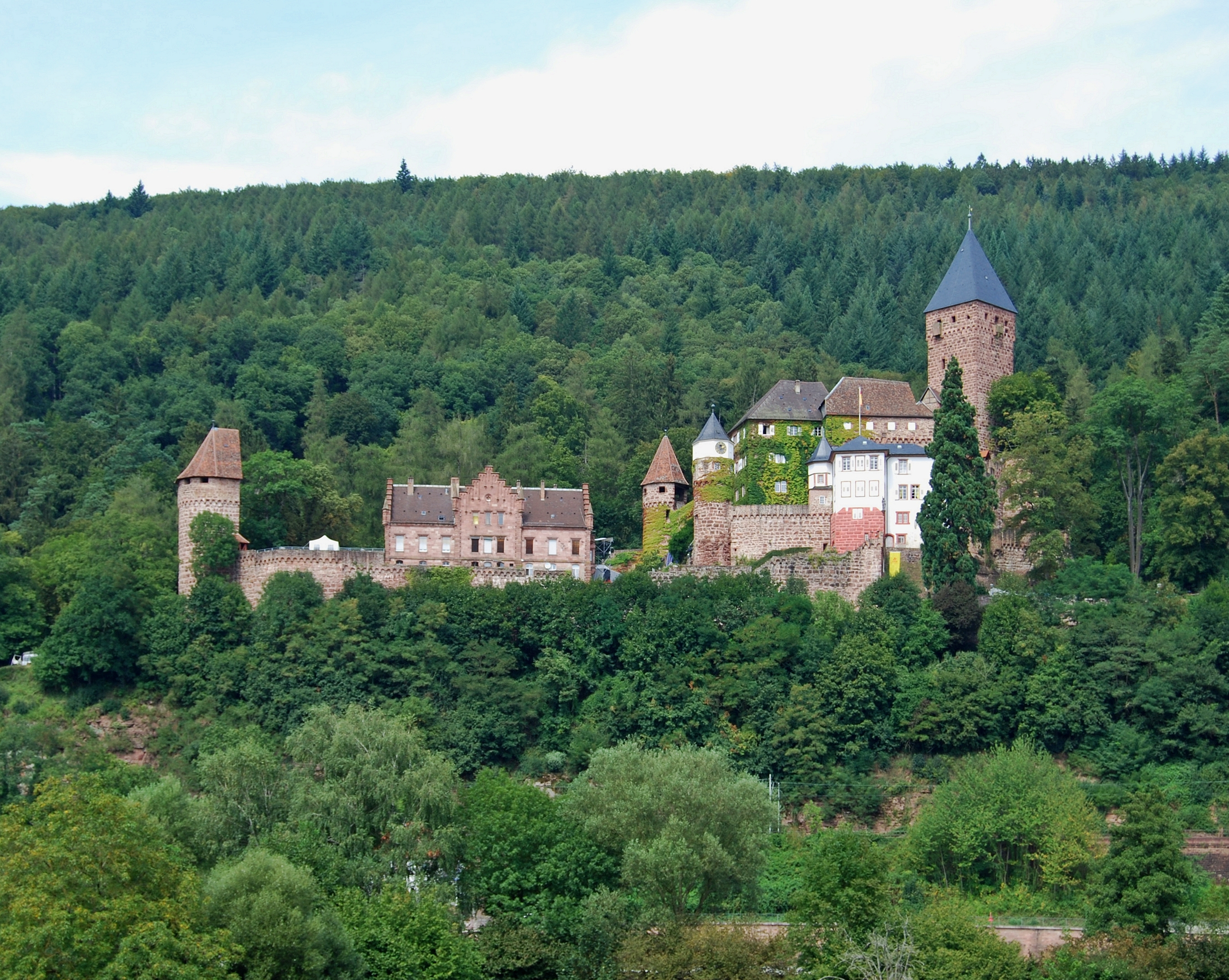
Zwingenberg Castle (also called the Zwingenburg) (Zwingenberg/Neckar)

== Music ==
Songs have been written about the Odenwald:

- Es steht ein Baum im Odenwald (“There Stands a Tree in the Odenwald”)
- Tief im Odenwald (“Deep in the Odenwald”)
- Der Bauer aus dem Odenwald (“The Farmer from the Odenwald”)

== See also ==
- Hessian dialects
- Historical territorial allegiances: Electorate of the Palatinate | Archbishopric of Mainz | Landgraviate of Hesse | Grand Duchy of Hesse | People's State of Hesse | Baden
