= Hessian Skittles =

Hill range in Germany

Coordinates: 50°43′03″N 9°50′30″E

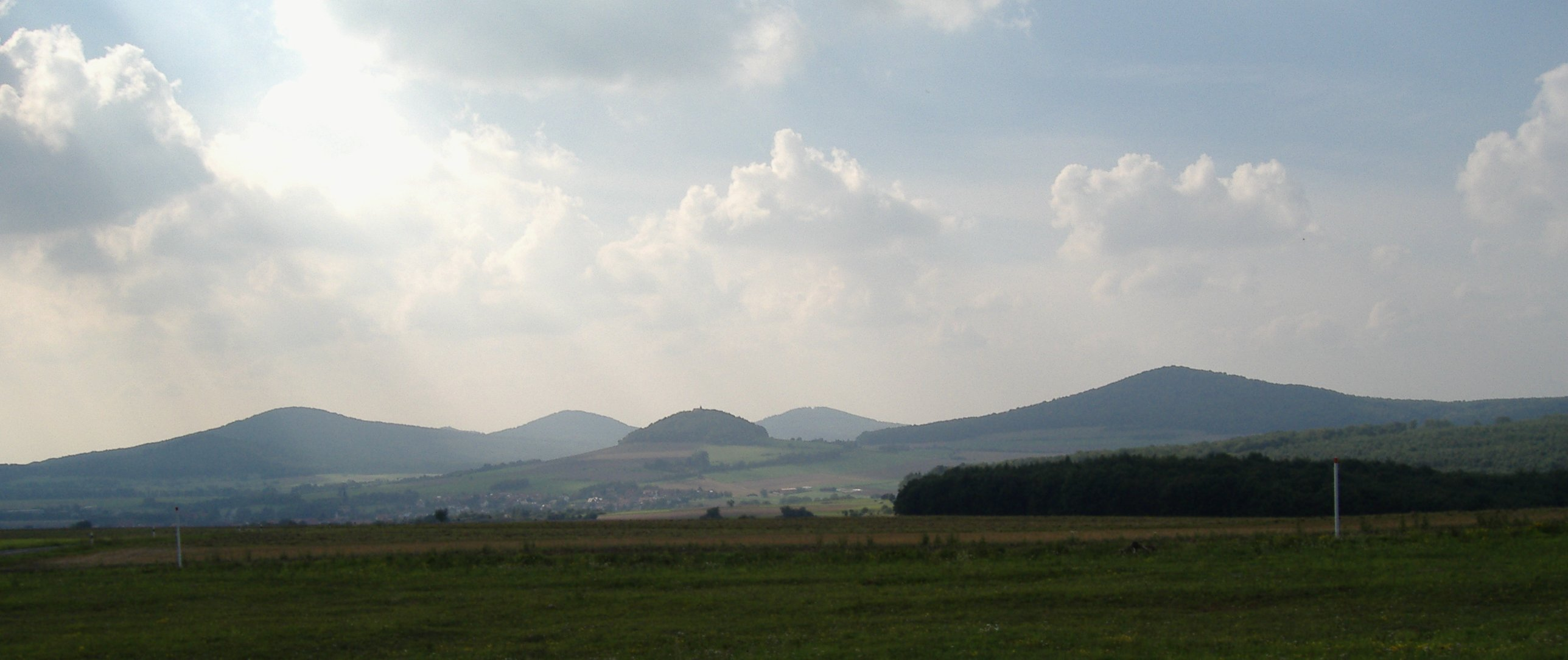
- The Hessian Skittles from the east

Highest point
- Peak: Soisberg
- Elevation: 629.9 m (2,067 ft)

Naming
- Native name: Hessisches Kegelspiel (German)

Geography
- Location: Hesse, Germany

The Hessian Skittles (German: Hessisches Kegelspiel) are a group of nine extinct volcanoes in the northwestern and lowest part of the Rhön Mountains in East Hesse, Germany. This striking collection of domed hills or kuppen is located in the counties of Hersfeld-Rotenburg and Fulda in the northwestern part of the Kuppen Rhön east of Eiterfeld and south of Schenklengsfeld.

== Geology and history ==
The heart of these kuppen, that were called the Hessian Skittles thanks to their similar shape and number, consists mainly of hexagonal basalt columns (see also under Stoppelsberg), that were formed as the lava cooled off.

According to legend, the giants had a skittle alley here, using the Stoppelsberg as the bowling ball.

== Mountains and hills ==
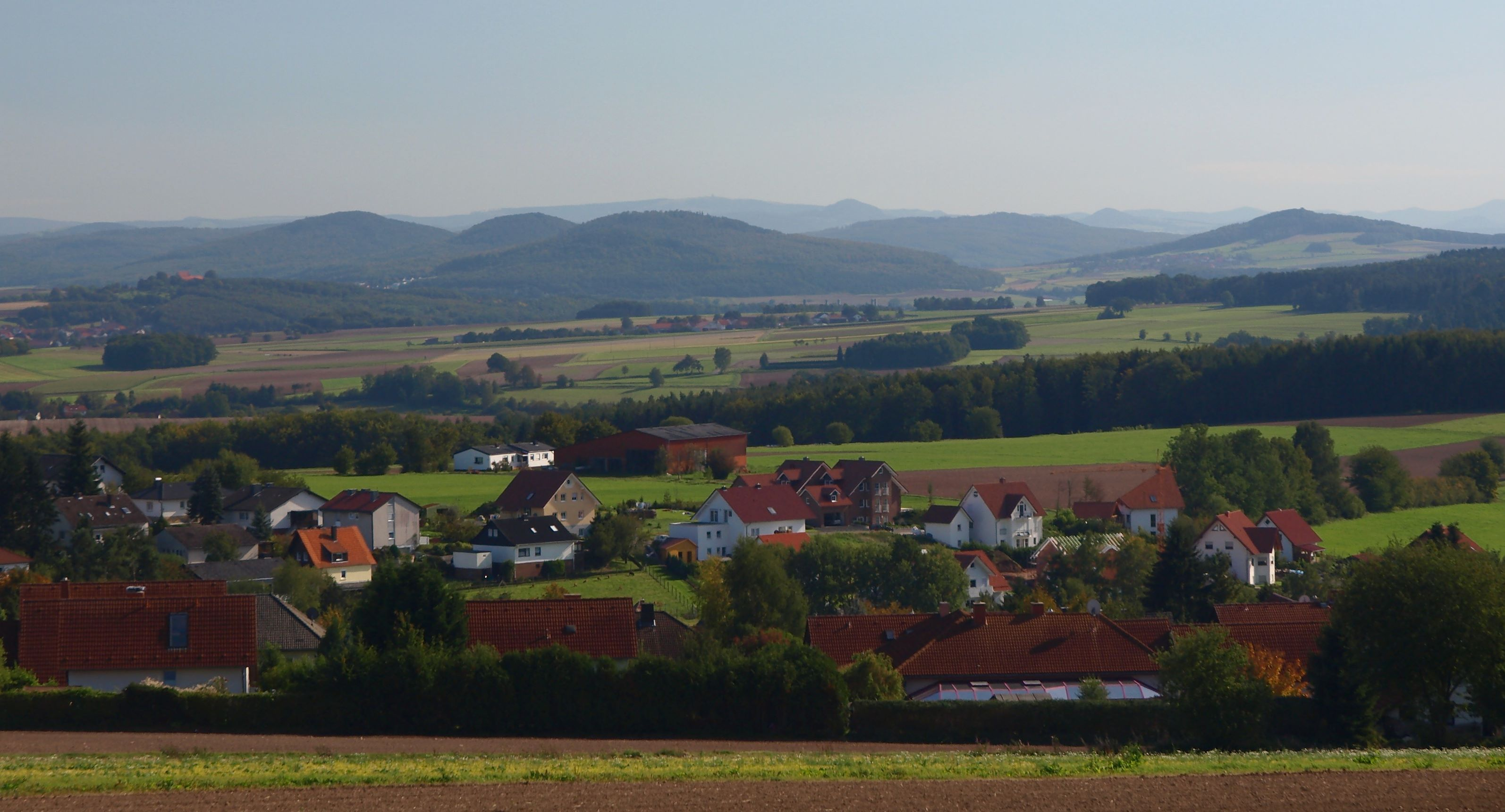
View of the Hessian Skittles from Schenklengsfeld-Wippershain, to the north

The nine summits of the Hessian Skittles include one mountain, the Soisberg, and eight hills. In order of their height in metres (m) above sea level (NHN), they are:

- Soisberg (629.9 m), with and observation tower, the Soisberg Tower
- Stallberg (552.9 m)
- Appelsberg (531.5 m)
- Rückersberg (524.7 m)
- Kleinberg (521.5 m)
- Wisselsberg (517.8 m)
- Hübelsberg (479.8 m)
- Morsberg (466.4 m)
- Lichtberg (465 m)

The Gehilfersberg (456 m) is not, however one of the skittles, even though it could have been considered due to its location. In addition, the Stoppelsberg (523.9 m, with the ruins of Hauneck Castle), which is counted as one of the skittles, lies to the west outside the actual Rhön region. This stems from a local mnemonic verse, which did not take the Hübelsberg and Gehilfersberg into consideration:

Ein Wiesel trägt auf seinem Rücken einen Apfel durch ein Stoppelfeld in einen kleinen, morschen Stall auf einer Lichtung, so is es. ("A weasel carried an apple on his back through a field of stubble into a small, rickety stable in a clearing, so he did.")

— Hessisches Kegelspiel, at eiterfeld.de, retrieved 25 March 2009

The sentence is used to remember the names of the various hills that all end in -berg: the Wissels-, Rückers-, Appels-, Stoppels-, Klein-, Mors-, Stall-, Licht- and Soisberg as the nine peaks in the game of skittles. An alternative, somewhat shorter version runs: Es trägt das kleine Wiesel auf seinem lichten Rücken, durch Moor und Hügel, den Apfel in den Stall. So ist es.

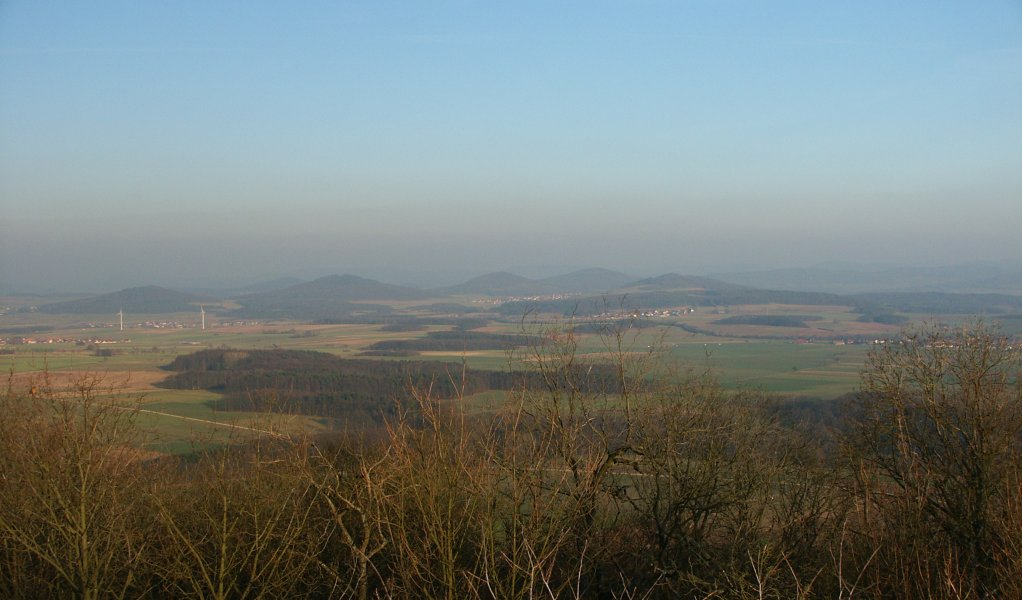
View of the Hessian Skittles from the Stoppelsberg to the west

== Literature ==
- Jessica Schäckermann, Martin Krämer: Stallberg – markante Basaltkuppe im Kegelspiel (PDF; 473 kB) Landkreis Fulda, Hessische Verwaltungsstelle Biosphärenreservat Rhön (publ.), 2006
- Pralle, Ludwig: Die Wallfahrtskirche am Gehilfersberg, in: Gemeindevorstand der Gemeinde Rasdorf (Hrsg.): Rasdorf, Beiträge zur Geschichte einer 1200-jährigen Gemeinde, Rasdorf, 1980, pp. 73 ff
- Sturm, Erwin: Rasdorf, Geschichte und Kunst, Seite 72 ff., Fulda, 1971
