= Linde in Schenklengsfeld =

Lime tree located in Schenklengsfeld

Coordinates: 50°49′9″N 9°50′41″E

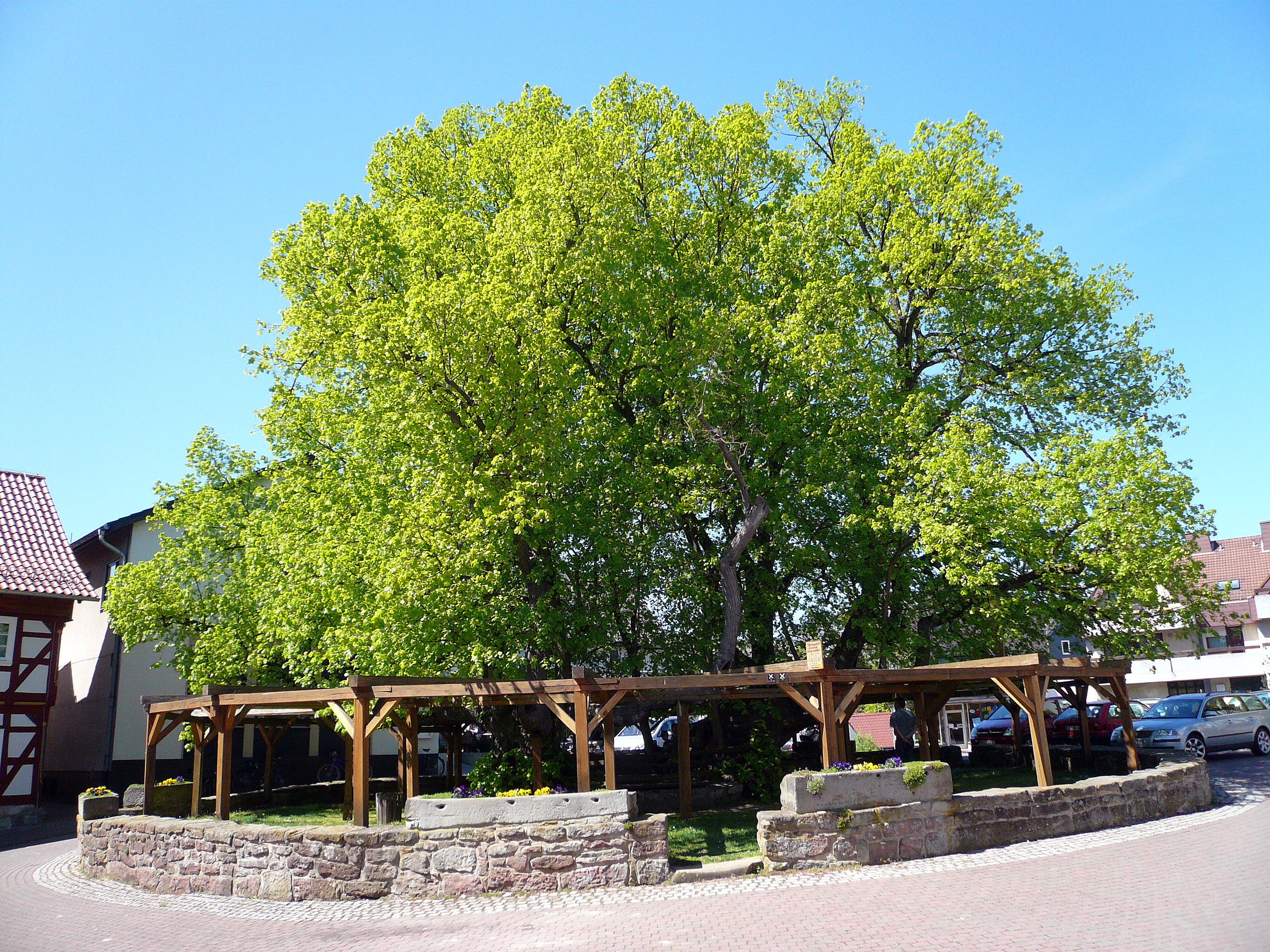
Linden tree with scaffolding

The Linde in Schenklengsfeld, also known as the Schenklengsfeld Dorflinde or Riesenlinde, is a thousand-year-old linden tree and is considered one of the oldest trees in Germany. This large-leaved lime tree (Tilia platyphyllos) is located in Schenklengsfeld, approximately ten kilometers southeast of Bad Hersfeld in the eastern Hessian district of Hersfeld-Rotenburg. Throughout its history, this tree served as a court lime tree, where legal proceedings and gatherings took place for several centuries. Additionally, a pillory was constructed near the tree for carrying out sentences.

== Location ==
The lime tree is situated at an elevation of approximately 318 meters above sea level, in the marketplace of Schenklengsfeld. This town is positioned on a fertile plateau between the Seulingswald to the north and the Hessisches Kegelspiel to the south. The market square has dimensions of about 30 by 60 meters and is now entirely paved. The lime tree itself is enclosed by a stone wall standing at approximately 50 cm in height. Supporting beams have been in place to support the lime tree's branches since at least 1900. Within the wall, there are several openings, and behind it stands the St. George fountain.

== Description ==
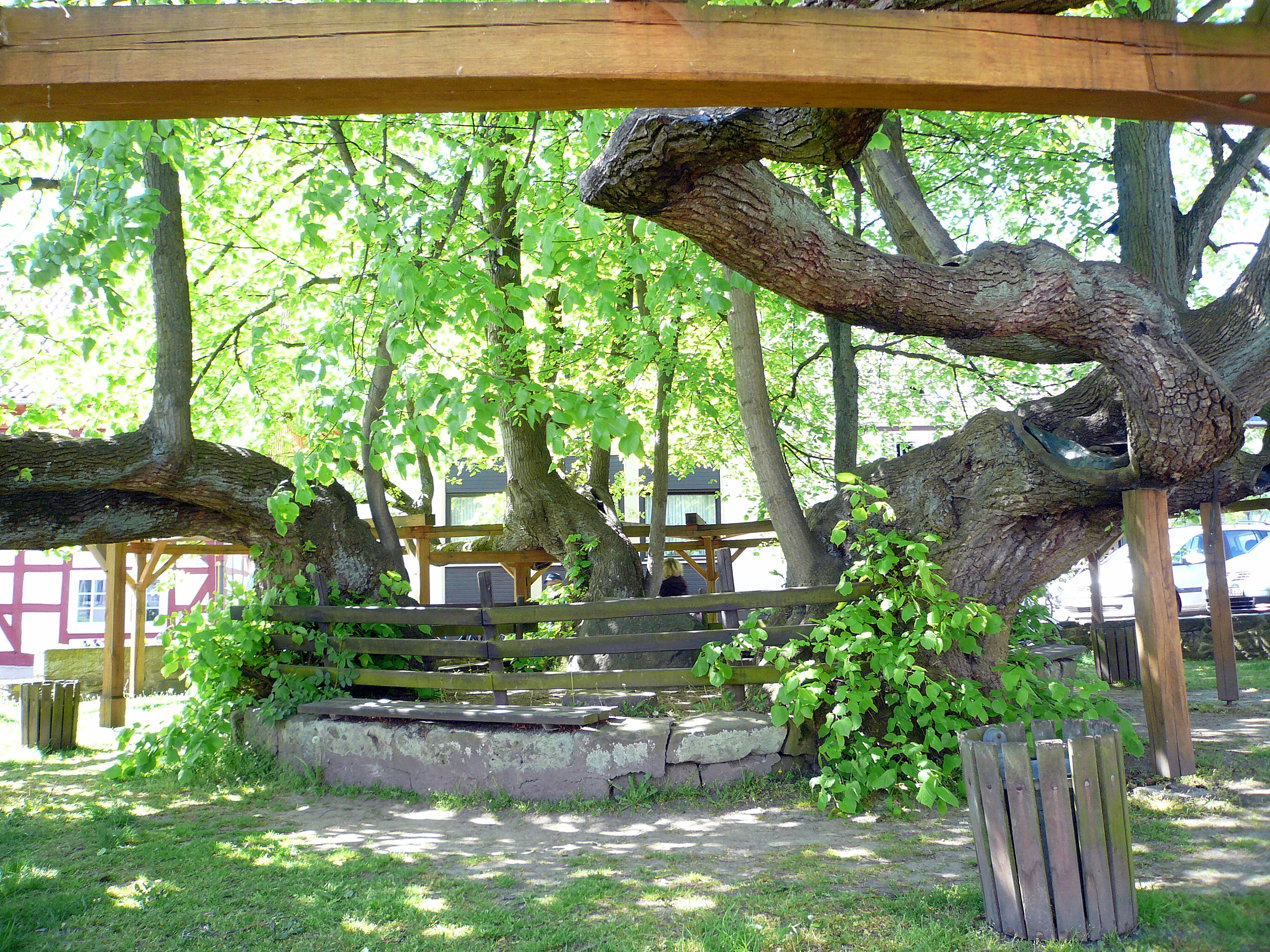
Supported trunk parts

The linden tree is composed of four distinct parts, which may appear as individual trees but originate from a standard rootstock. In the interior area, between these four trunks, there is a larger open space of approximately six square meters. This space is elevated by stones and enclosed by a picket fence.

The crown of the lime tree is characterized by its horizontal main branches. These branches are supported by a framework that extends for about 65 meters and is upheld by more than 80 beams. While most of the branches grow outward horizontally, a few branches grow vertically in the center of the crown. This unique growth pattern, with predominantly horizontal branches, was achieved by encouraging the crown to expand in width rather than height. At a height of approximately ten meters, the crown boasts a diameter of nearly 25 meters. With a circumference of 120 meters, the Schenklengsfeld linden tree possesses the largest preserved canopy among lime trees. Historians recommend careful restoration efforts to maintain its original flat growth form.

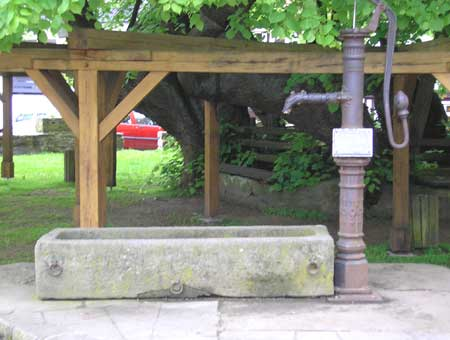
Saint George Fountain

The exact origin of the Schenklengsfeld linden tree, whether it originated from a single tree that split or from four adjacent trees that fused into a common rootstock, remains uncertain. According to legend, the Linden tree was once struck by lightning, causing it to split. In earlier times, when the trunk was still in one piece, it was said that there were beams and planks on the main branches that served as a dance floor. However, the accuracy of these legends is questioned by some experts.

It is documented from other Tanzlinde that the practice of conducting the branches was employed to obtain bast for grafting in apple cultivation. In this process, the young vertical shoots of the conducted lime tree were cut off. To ensure a consistent harvest of branches, the main branches were bent downward and secured in this position. This resulted in the characteristic cross-bearing growth pattern. Whether the Schenklengsfeld linden tree was cultivated similarly is not known.

=== Trunk circumference ===
Measuring the circumference of the trunk is difficult because the trunk consists of four separate parts. To measure its circumference, one must measure around each of the four trunk parts individually, each of which has a circumference of about three meters. The missing space in between these trunks is not included in the measurement. At a height of one meter, the trunk circumference, measured in this manner, is recorded as 17.91 meters. At the point of its smallest diameter, the trunk has a circumference of 17.80 meters. These measurements establish the Schenklengsfeld Linden tree as having the largest circumference of any tree in Germany. An earlier measurement by Hartwig Goerss in 1978 recorded a circumference of 17.40 meters at a height of 0.5 meters.

=== Age ===
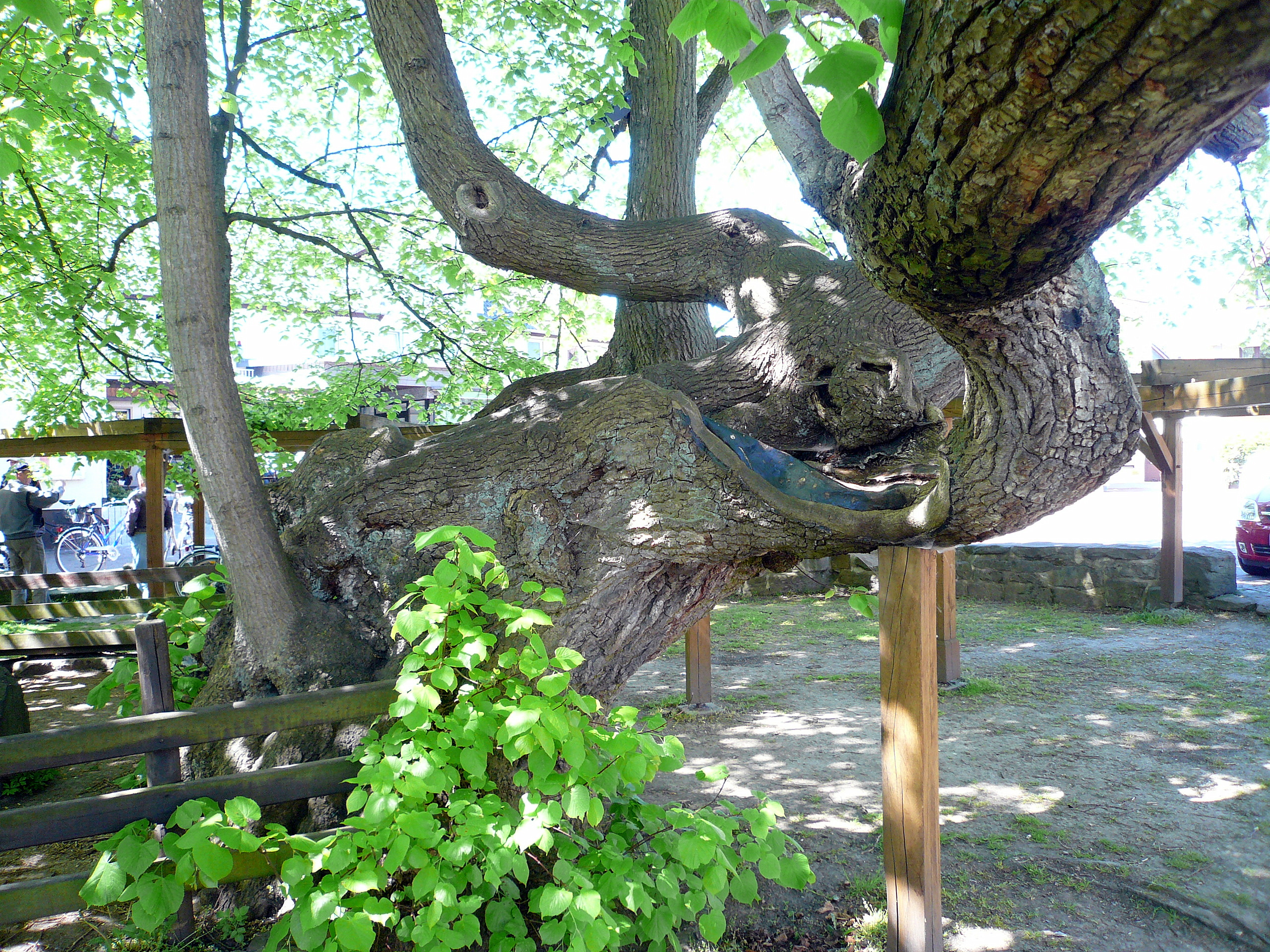
Supported trunk

The age of the Schenklengsfeld linden tree is a subject of debate, and there are varying data regarding its age. A stone located in the center of the four trunk parts bears the inscription "Planted in 760." This date coincides with the construction date of the chapel. If accurate, this inscription would suggest that the Linden tree is approximately 1,250 years old today. However, it is believed that this date was engraved on the stone in the 20th century by a village schoolteacher.

In a program titled Deutschlands älteste Bäume (Germany's oldest trees) on ARD, Stefan Kühn of the Deutsches Baumarchiv (German Tree Archive) presented the linden tree as probably being 1,000 years old or even older. Hans Joachim Fröhlich also estimated an age of over 1,000 years in 1990, while Anette Lenzing suggested an age of 1,200 to 1,300 years in 2005. In more recent literature, such as Deutschlands alte Bäume (Germany's old trees), the age of the linden tree is estimated to be between 600 and 1,000 years. The minimum estimate of 600 years comes from Bernd Ullrich, while the 1,000-year estimate is based on documents from the Deutsches Baumarchiv. In 2012, the tree's age was listed as 1,275 years.

== History ==
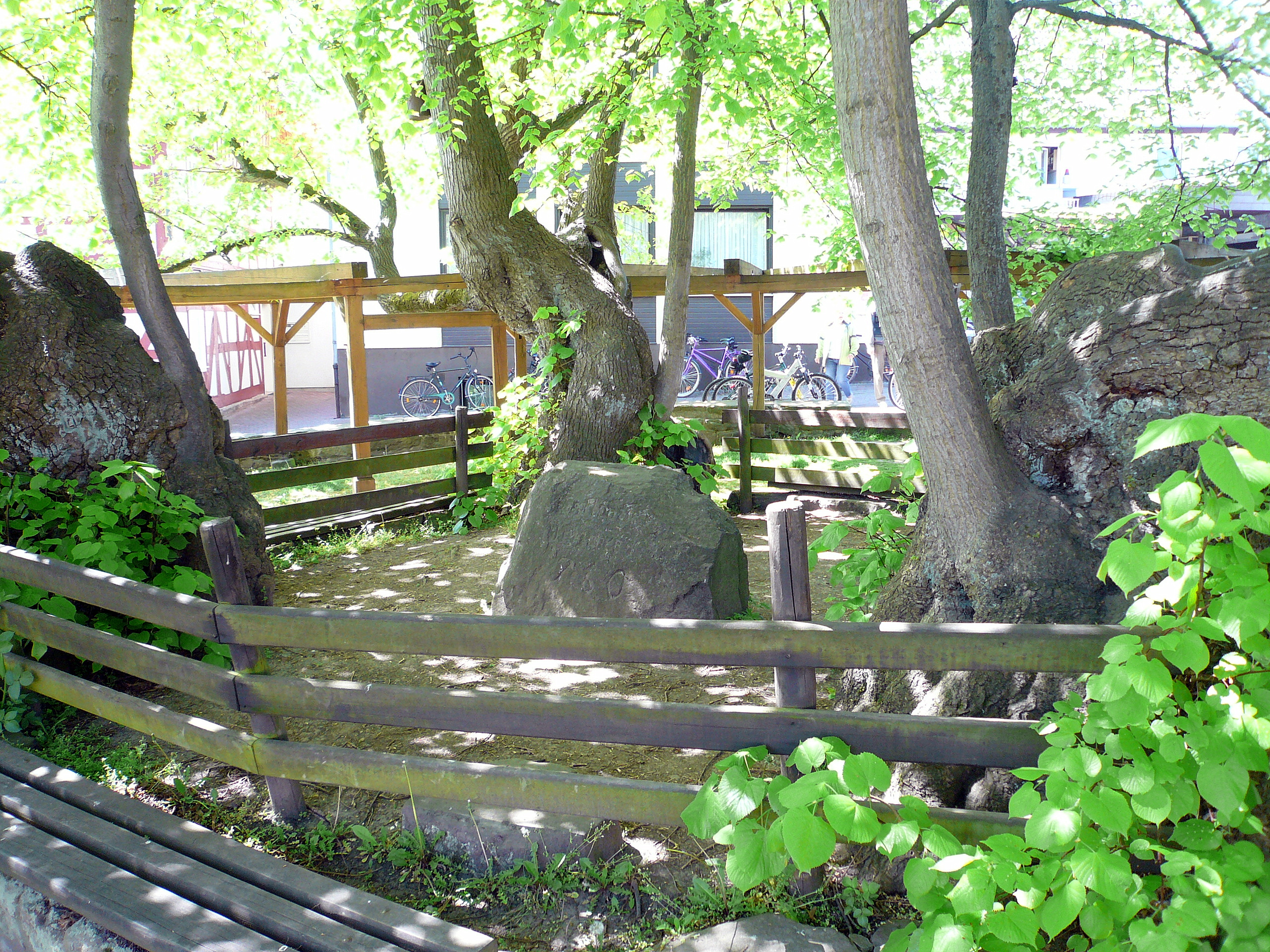
Open space with stone between the four trunk parts

According to P. Rosskopf from 1964 in Das Landecker Amt im Kreise Hersfeld, the linden tree is said to have been planted in 760 during the construction of a chapel dedicated to the knight Saint George. This information is based on a stone located in the center of the four trunk parts. The place was known as Lengisfeld at that time. However, there is no documented evidence of the tree's planting. The lime tree served as a court lime tree permanently from 1557 to 1796 and intermittently into the 19th century. It was also a gathering place for dancing and fairs for an extended period.

Due to its unique nature, the Linden tree has long been designated as a natural monument. It received protection as early as 1926 and 1930 through orders issued by district and local police authorities to protect natural monuments, and in 1936 under the Reich Nature Conservation Act. In 1976, the tree underwent renovation by tree surgeon Michael Maurer for 11,000 DM. Another renovation took place on 16 November 2009, carried out by the company Gebrüder Wäldchen from Ulrichstein on behalf of the UNB (Untere Naturschutz-Behörde des Landkreises Hersfeld-Rotenburg) (Lower Nature Conservation Authority of the Hersfeld-Rotenburg District).

=== Tanzlinde (Dancing lime tree) ===
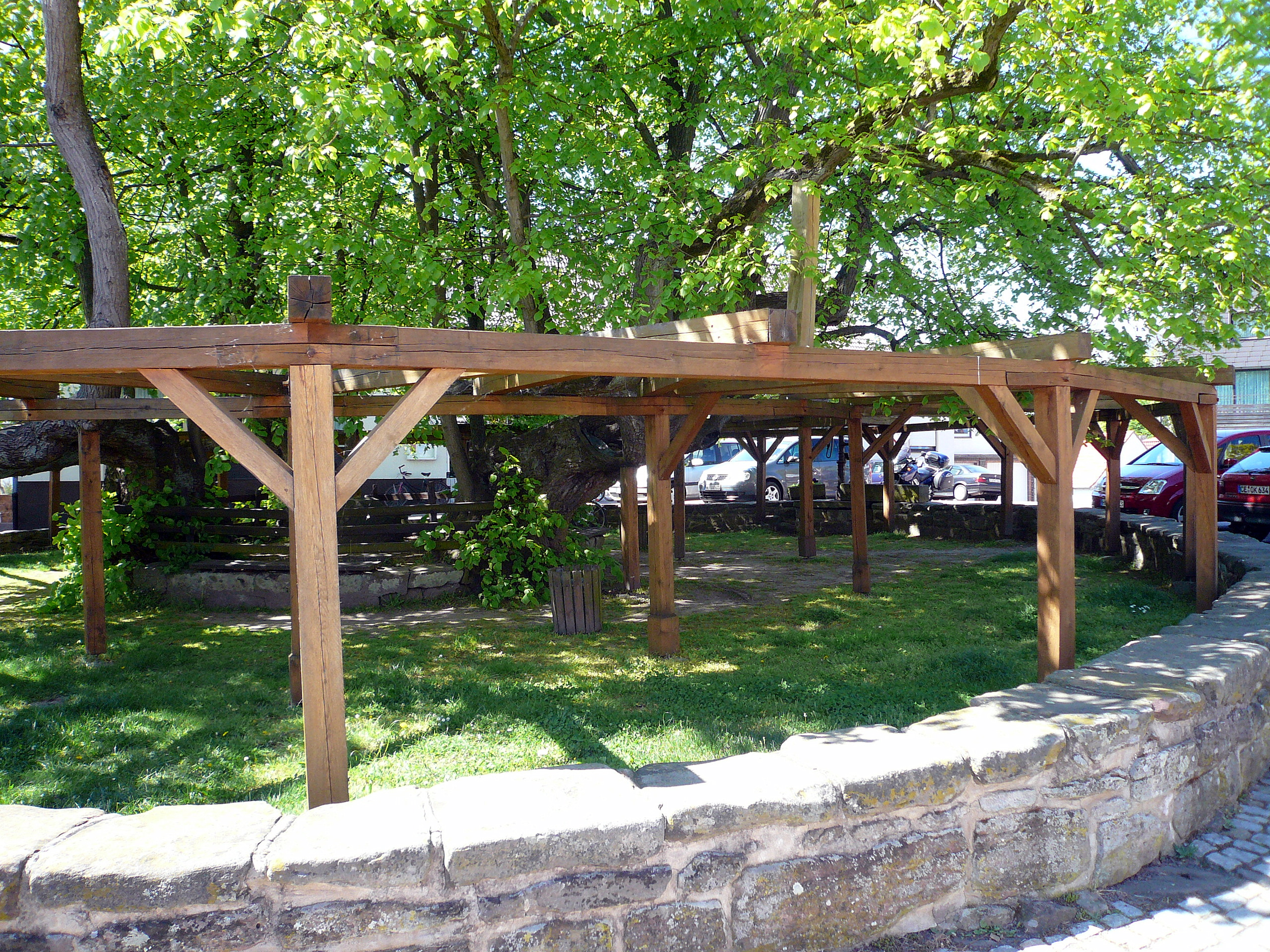
Timber frame with stone wall

The tree surgeon Michael Maurer describes the former appearance and use of the linden tree in his report of 30 September 1968, as follows:

"And it is not only the Schenklengsfeld lime tree, whose lower branch crown one pulled out so far. Originally one pulled this lime tree high in three stages, even 3 stages of the ground. This is connected with the division in the Germanic faith: Under the tree the giants (devils), in the tree the people and above in the third stage (heaven) the Aesir. In addition, it was believed that the bridal dance had to be danced in the house of Freija, the good fairy, to bring good luck. Certainly, this lime tree was once three-tiered. Just like at the famous Effeltrich lime [...] the middle trunk wasted away by the too strong promotion of the lowest stage, it starved, died from above. Certainly, 200 years ago, one danced at the top, later at the bottom."

— Michael Maurer : Report on the lime tree

=== Gerichtslinde (Court lime tree) ===
In Schenklengsfeld, officials exercised the office of judge permanently from 1557 to 1796 and then intermittently until well into the 19th century. The former official house at Landeckerstraße 8, situated near the Linden tree, served as the seat of the Landgravial-Hessian Amtmann, the highest judge of the Landecker Amt. Under the court lime tree, the council meetings introduced by Charlemagne were held as a Thing or reprimand court. During these proceedings, convicted field offenders would be chained under the lime tree to a stake for varying durations, ranging from one or more hours to sometimes one or more days. This historical practice is supported by the discovery of a locking iron used to fasten convicts to the pillory. Hartwig Goerss documented this information in 1981:

"In earlier times, the courts of reprimand [...] took place under the linden tree. [...] were held by the municipal council and had the purpose to condemn the field offenders. These wrongdoers [...] were connected to a pole (Löngestock) placed under the lime tree, to which there was a closing iron, for one or more hours, often for a whole day."

— Hartwig Goerss

=== Present-day significance ===
The dance meeting has survived to the present day and is celebrated every two years in June as the Linden Blossom Festival. During this event, traditional costume groups, singing societies, and historical pageants present scenes from history. As a highlight, an illumination of the Linden tree by fireworks takes place at the end of the festival. The Linden tree is one of the sights of the municipality.
