= Gehilfersberg =

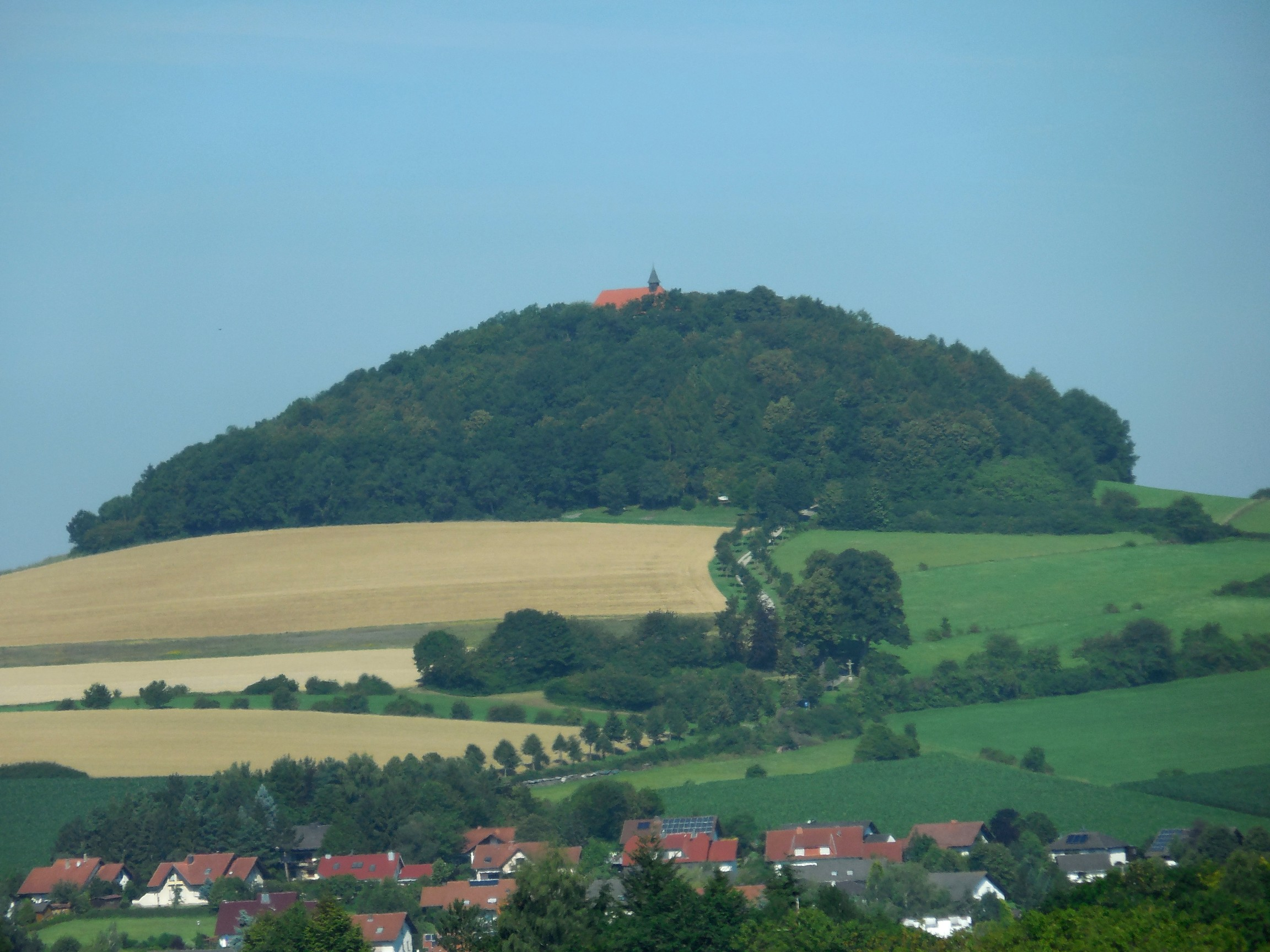
- Gehilfersberg near Rasdorf

Highest point
- Elevation: 456 m (1,496 ft)
- Coordinates: 50°43′31″N 9°53′06″E

Geography
- Location within Hesse
- Location: Fulda district, Hesse, Germany
- Parent range: Rhön

Geology
- Mountain type: extinct volcano

The Gehilfersberg is a hill in the Landkreis Fulda, Hesse, Germany. It is part of the Rhön hills and lies northwest of the village of Rasdorf.

The basalt peak is located close to the range known as "Hessian Skittles" (Hessisches Kegelspiel) but there are diverging views on whether it should be counted as one of the nine hills "officially" part of the "nine pins".

On the peak is a Baroque pilgrimage chapel St. Marien und Vierzehn Nothelfer, dedicated to Virgin Mary and the Fourteen Holy Helpers, construction of which began during the reign of Johann Bernhard Schenk von Schweinsberg (1623-1632), Abbot of Fulda to replace an earlier chapel that had been destroyed. It was consecrated in 1681. Initially, a figure of Christ (the holy Gehülf) was revered, but the focus shifted to the Fourteen Helpers over time. From the 18th century, the Gehilfersberg was one of the most important pilgrimage destinations in eastern Hesse. Seven stations mark the Stations of the Cross leading up from Rasdorf. There is also a fortified cemetery (Wehrfriedhof) at the top.

On 11 May 1996, the Catholic chapel was destroyed by arson. However, it was quickly rebuilt and rededicated by Bishop of Fulda Johannes Dyba on 19 May 1997.

More recently, a part of the wooded slopes has been designated as a burial forest.
