= Tanzlinde (Effeltrich) =

Tree in the Forchheim district in Bavaria

Coordinates: 49°39′34.4″N 11°5′33.9″E

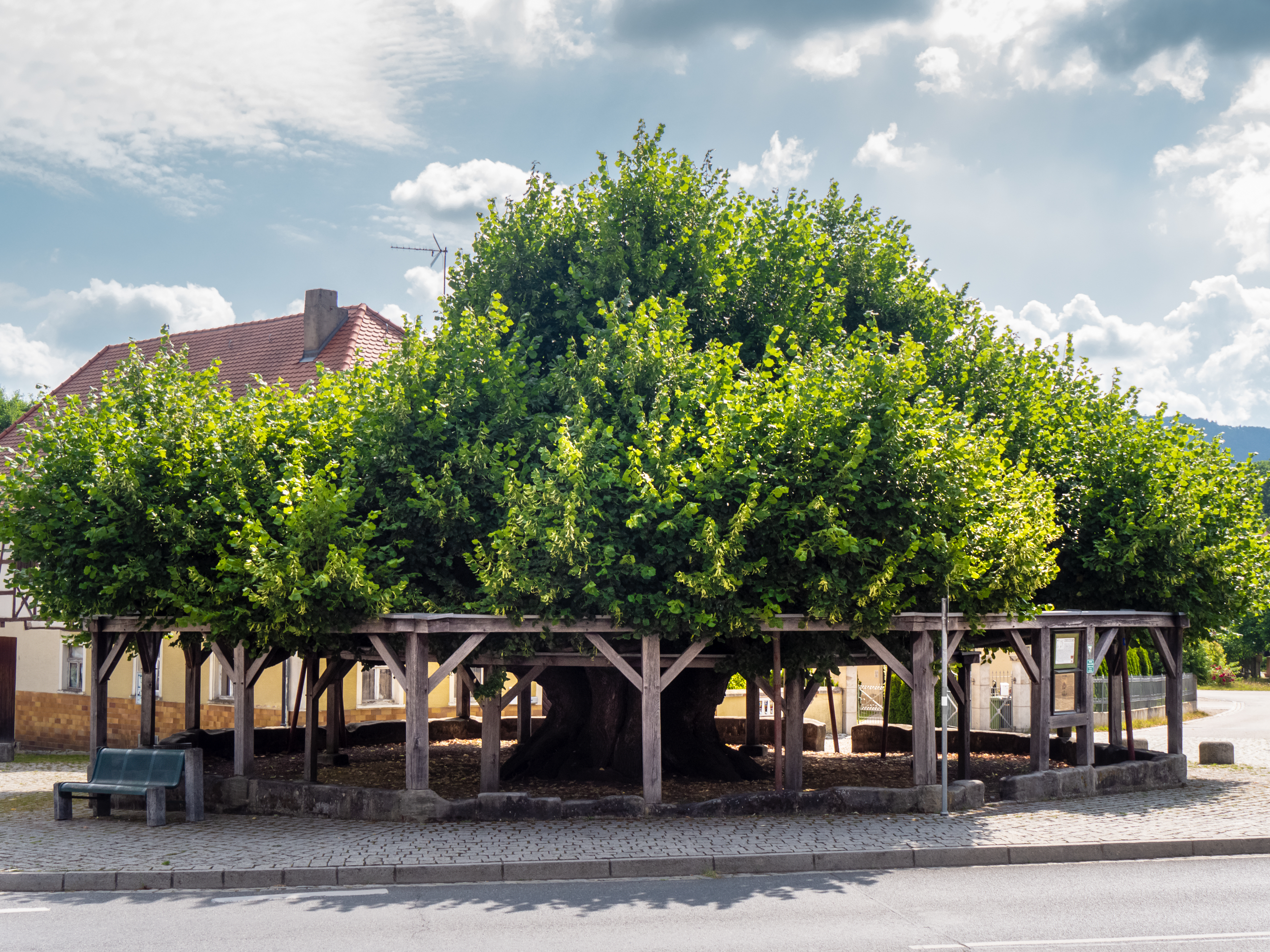
The oval, supported crown viewed from the south

The Tanzlinde, also known as the Tausendjährige Linde or Dorflinde, is a summer lime tree (Tilia platyphyllos) located in Effeltrich, Upper Franconia, on the western edge of Franconian Switzerland. Positioned on the village square across from the fortified church, the lime tree has held a significant role as a central gathering, assembly, and judicial site for centuries. Throughout the 19th and 20th centuries, it also served as a venue for festivals and dances. Notably, the tree's growth features a distinctive flat-oval crown, a result of historical bast extraction for the cultivation of fruit trees. The lime tree in the Franconian region is often seen as the most beautiful among many village lime trees. Many tales, stories, and legends are attributed to the lime tree due to its varied life.

== Description ==
Despite its old age, the lime tree maintains a strong and vibrant appearance, with its branches retaining well-leafy and abundant blossoms even at the top. The crown rests on a double ring-shaped beam framework comprising 24 supports, with the outer ring sitting on a 49-meter-long and 90-centimeter-high stone wall encircling the tree. This final stone wall also serves to protect the root area inside the wall. Without this framework of beams, the trunk of the Linden tree would break apart under the weight of the strong, spreading branches. Additionally, some of the branches are supported by two iron pipes each. Unlike certain other Tanzlinde trees, such as the one in Sachsenbrunn, the Effeltrich lime tree's branches were never outfitted with a dance platform. The festivities and dances took place beneath the beam structure instead. The crown of the tree boasts a diameter slightly exceeding 20 meters at a height of approximately seven meters. The crown is formed by eight strong, horizontally drawn branches with diameters up to 90 centimeters. The open trunk is closed by several iron bars. The trunk is completely hollow and completely filled with mulm. An adventitious root, about ten centimeters in thickness, has grown within the trunk to enhance nutrient supply to specific portions of the crown. Many of the extended and supported older branches also possess a hollow interior, with some upper sections missing, making the branches essentially half-shells composed of bark material.

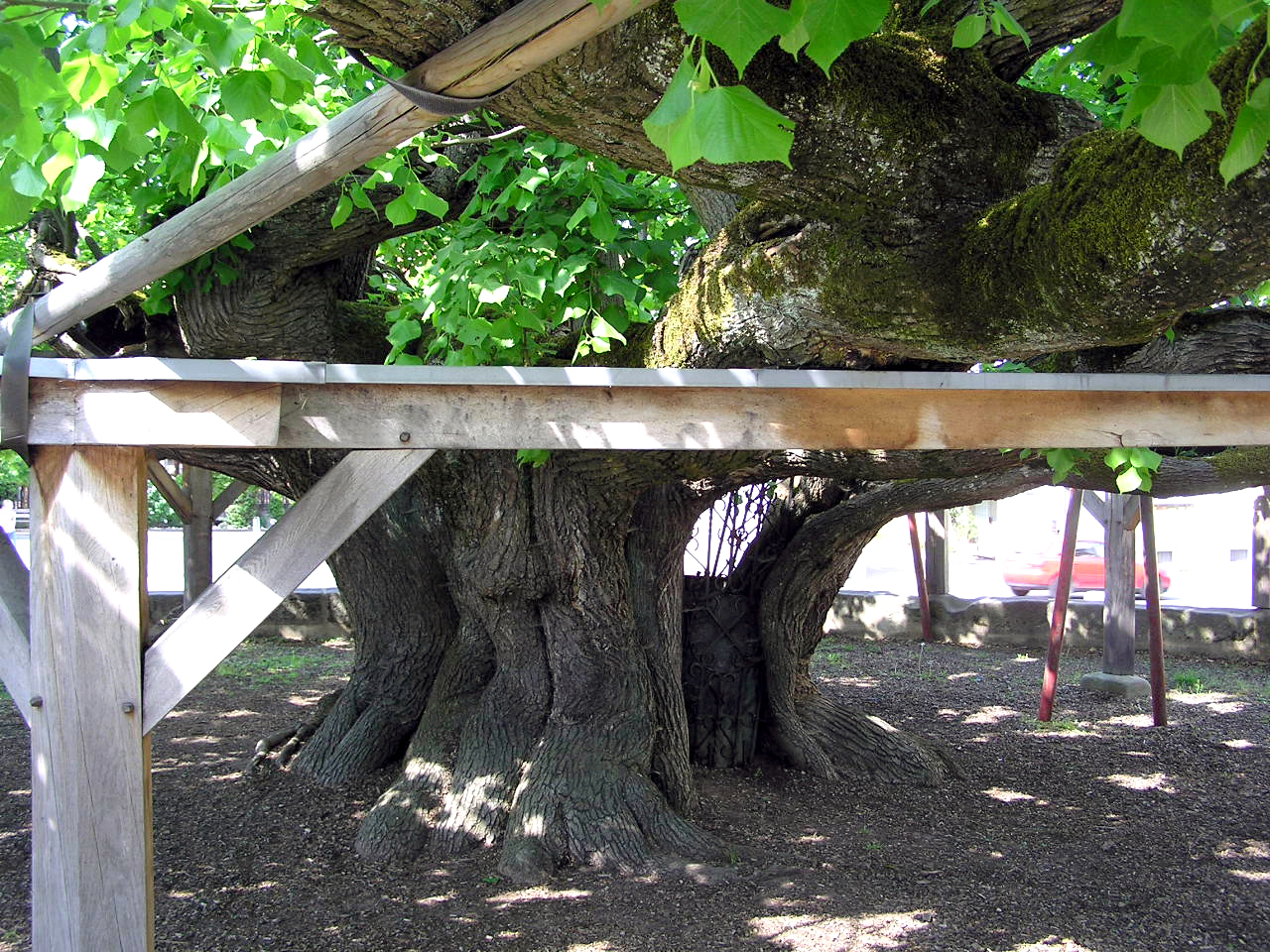
The trunk of the linden tree

The appearance of the crown has undergone some changes over the past century. A photograph captured by tree photographer Friedrich Stützer for his tree book "Die größten, ältesten oder sonst merkwürdigen Bäume Bayerns in Wort und Bild" (The largest, oldest or otherwise strange trees of Bavaria in words and pictures) depicts the crown as broader and flatter compared to its present state. In that era, the crown extended several meters beyond the beam framework and the terminating wall, which now roughly defines the crown's boundaries. Since for many years the vertical shoots have no longer been regularly removed for bast extraction, the crown has also partially expanded upwards.

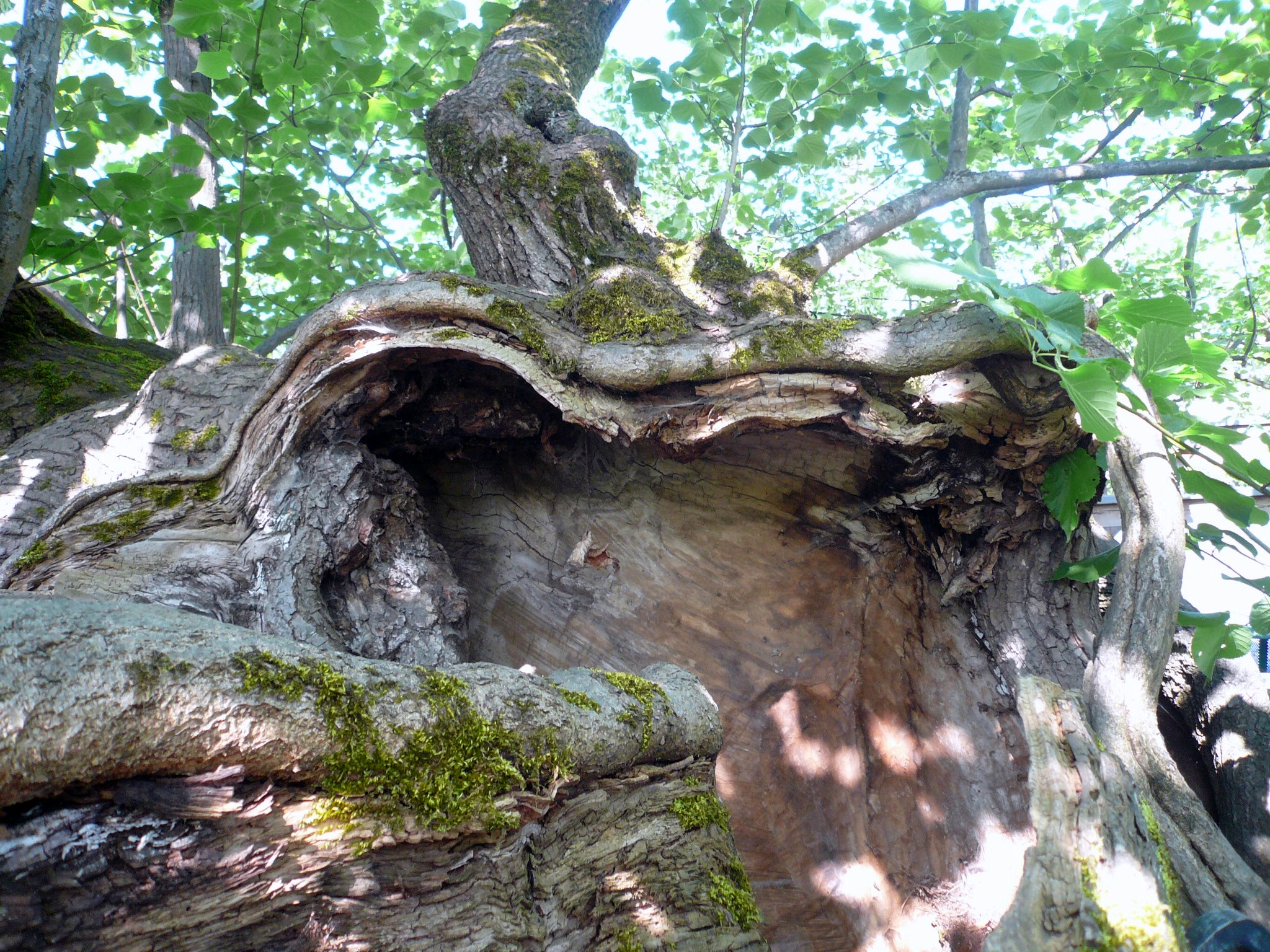
Hollow and open branch

The lime tree's wood volume, excluding the root wood, is estimated to be 36 cubic meters. The tree possesses an extensive network of roots. Strong roots were discovered about 40 meters from the trunk in a dung heap and within a cellar. Additionally, while excavating a well, linden roots were unearthed approximately 50 meters away; this discovery may indicate the tree's maximum root reach.

=== Apostle lime tree ===
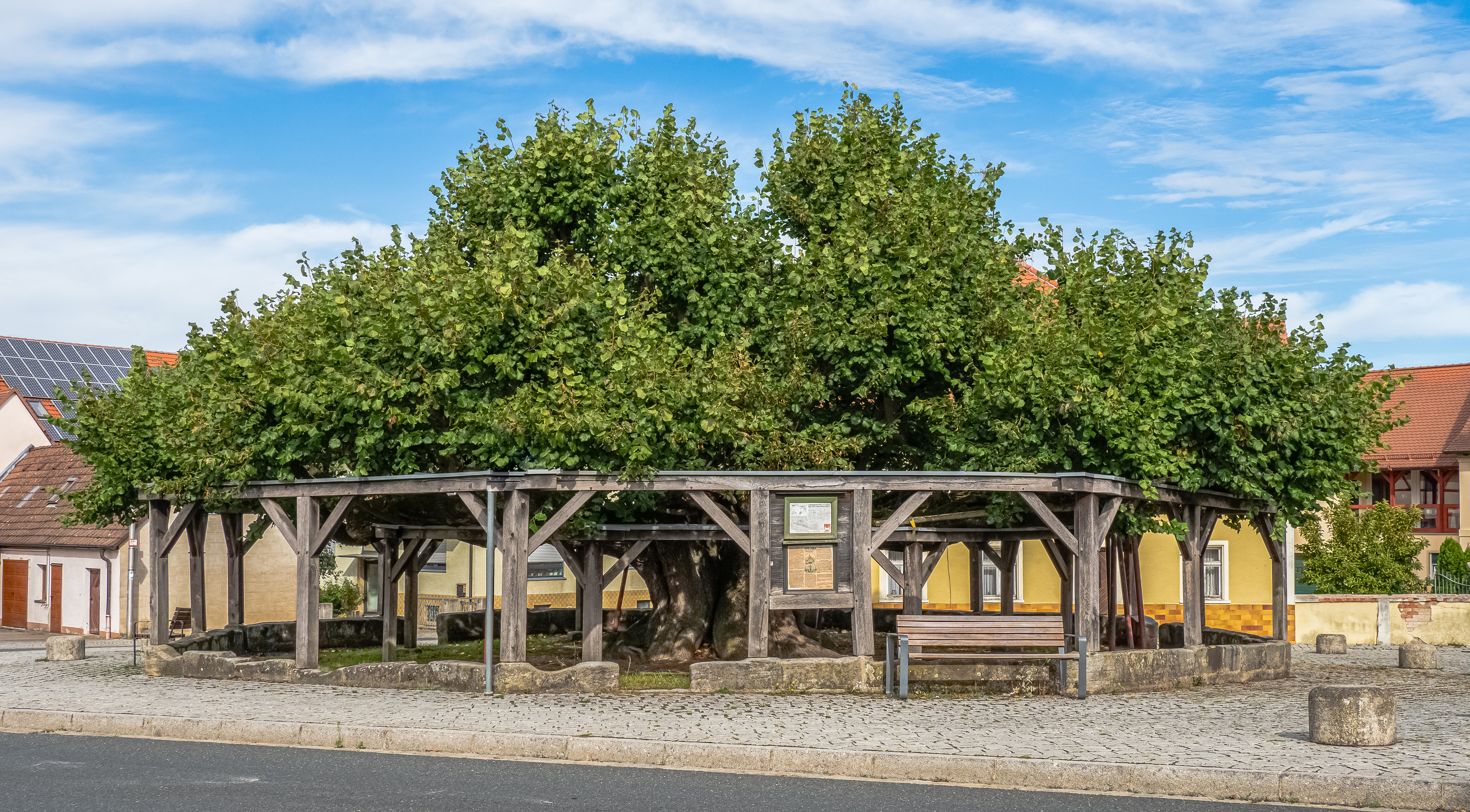
“Thousand-year-old lime tree”

The lime tree has eight branches spreading from its trunk. Some of these branches extend further, resulting in a total of twelve branches reaching the outer stone wreath. The number twelve stands for the twelve apostles, twelve hours, twelve months, and twelve signs of the zodiac. According to mysticism, it is referred to as an apostle lime tree, of which there are very few in Germany. With the number twelve, there is also a connection to heaven and earth, whereby this can be determined by multiplying three times four. In Greek mythology, the number three signifies the trinity of the gods Zeus, Poseidon, and Hades, although many other gods and mythical figures appear in the trinity. Meanwhile, the number four symbolizes the earth with its four cardinal points north, east, south, and west. (Note: However, it is not certain whether the lime tree is actually an apostle lime tree, formed by intentionally pulling the twelve branches, or whether this was accidentally formed by the death and removal of other branches.)

=== Location ===
The lime tree is positioned at the heart of the village square and at the intersection of several roads in the municipality of Effeltrich in the district of Forchheim. To the south, it is 24 kilometers from Nuremberg, and the altitude is about 300 meters above sea level. It is framed by the church castle of St. Georg with high walls and pointed towers and old half-timbered houses and inns. The state road 2243 to Forchheim passes by the Linden tree, which is identical here to the Castle Road.

=== Age ===
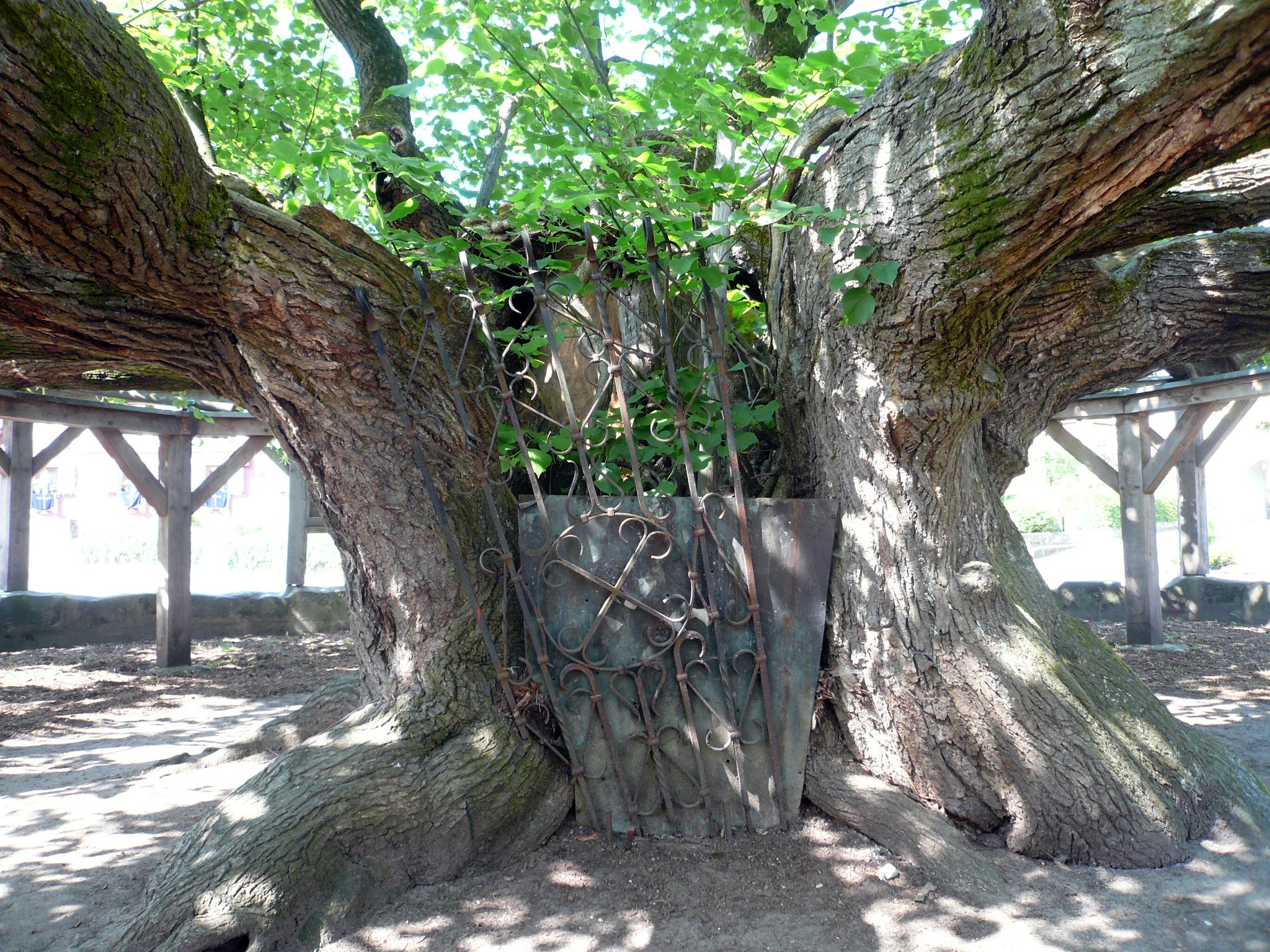
Divided trunk with trellis

Various statements in the literature present differing perspectives on the age of the lime tree. The availability of certain essential components for accurate age determination, such as tree ring counts and radiocarbon dating (14C dating), is limited due to the hollow nature of the trunk and the absence of the oldest wood parts in the inner region. Consequently, the precise age of the Linden tree remains uncertain. Estimates regarding its age span range from 400 to 1000 years. Analysis of the trunk diameter and comparison with similar trees suggests an approximate age of 800 years. The age of the lime tree is often linked to the founding year 1007 of the bishopric of Bamberg, which would imply an age over 1000 years. However, this assertion could be excessive given the presence of deeply shriveled bark on the tree, indicative of high age. Determining age based on trunk circumference is difficult due to the influence of supported main branches, which can lead to a slower growth in thickness. A supported lime tree may be classified as considerably older than a freely grown lime tree with the same trunk diameter and similar environmental conditions.

Even prior to World War I, the tree's age was estimated to be at least, 1000 years, as suggested by Gustav von Bezold, the then-director of the (Germanisches Nationalmuseum) Germanic National Museum in Nuremberg. In 1935, experts estimated its age to be around 800 years. The Deutsche Baumarchiv (German Tree Archive), known for its cautious approach to age determinations, offered an estimate of 400 to 670 years in 2007. Nonetheless, the Deutsche Baumarchiv counts the lime tree as among the oldest lime trees in Germany. Hans Joachim Fröhlich, initiator of the Kuratorium Alte liebenswerte Bäume in Deutschland e.V. (Curatorship Old Lovable Trees in Germany e.V.), cited an age range of 800 to 1000 years for the lime tree in 1990. Anette Lenzing's estimation in 2005 also aligns with an age of 800 to 1000 years. In 2007, Michel Brunner's assessment approximated the age of the lime tree to be around 700 years. The lime tree continues to be regarded as one of the oldest trees in Germany.

=== Trunk circumference ===
In 2000, the trunk had a circumference of at least 7.51 meters at the point of smallest diameter. Currently, the circumference at a height of one meter is slightly under eight meters, while at a height of ten centimeters above the ground, it measures over eleven meters. Measurements from 1981 registered a circumference of 8.8 meters at a height of 30 centimeters above the ground, commonly referred to as Brusthöhe (BHU) (breast height). Additionally, measurements conducted in 1987 indicated a circumference of 7.77 meters at a height of one meter above the ground. Fröhlich's data from 1990 recorded a trunk circumference of 8.3 meters at a height of 1.3 meters.

== History ==
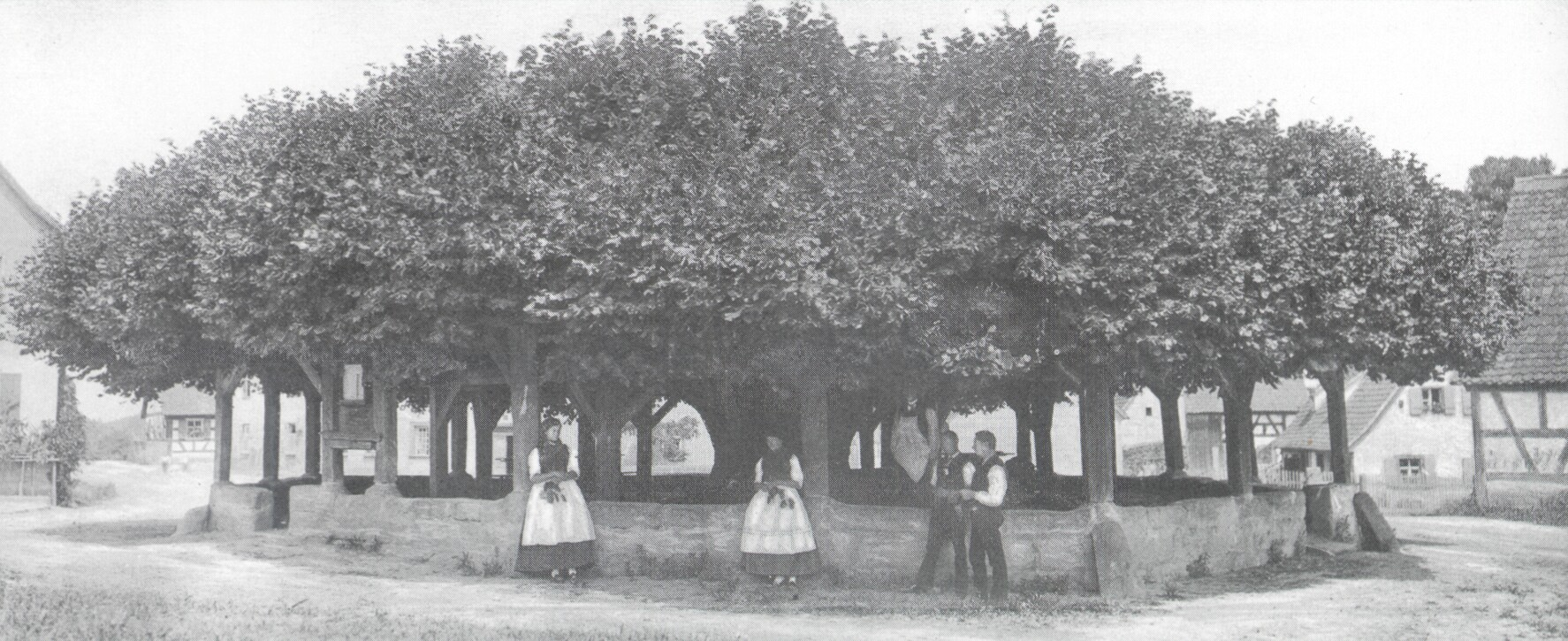
Dancing linden tree around 1900

According to tradition, the lime tree was reportedly used as a Thingbaum (Thing tree) by the Wends prior to their Christianization around the year 1004. (Note: The year of Christianization is not certain. According to another source, Important Linden, page 101, the Christianization happened around the year 1100.) Historical records suggest that court proceedings may have taken place under the lime tree in earlier centuries. This is suggested by the presence of a stone wreath, approximately 90 centimeters in height, encircling the lime tree. Additionally, the custom of men wearing hats and women wearing white headscarves during festivities under the lime tree aligns with this period, harkening back to the time of the Wends. It is also possible that such celebrations occurred beneath a precursor lime tree that may have occupied the same location.

Until the year 1950, the area beneath the lime tree was furnished with tables and benches, offering a place of gathering and providing hospitality through the nearby inn. After the Second World War, the main road that runs adjacent to the lime tree underwent expansion, leading to a gradual rise in motorized vehicle traffic. In 1966, the inattentiveness of two motorists resulted in the unintentional breakage of two substantial branches situated along the road. As a result, the linden tree lost the even, harmonious structure of its crown. The road was slightly moved during a further expansion, giving the lime tree a bit more space. The lime tree is a registered natural monument (ND-04472) and is under protection

=== Fruit tree cultivation ===
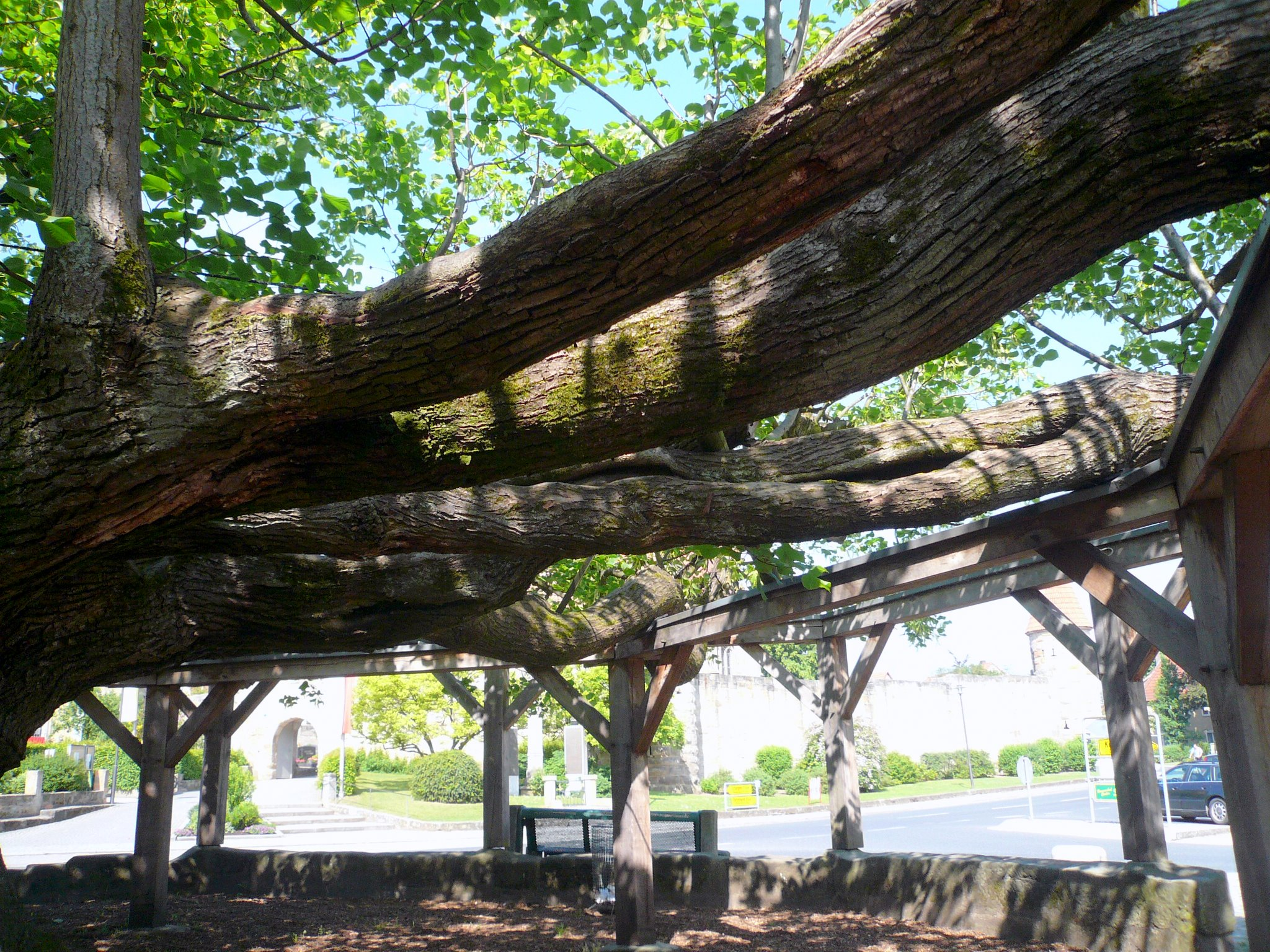
Cross-braced, supported branches

The name Effeltrich means place with many apple trees or apple-rich. Even today, the lime tree bears visible signs of its long history of providing bast for fruit tree cultivation: For the grafting of young fruit trees, the young vertical shoots of the lime tree were cut off for decades until about 1850 and their bast was used for tying and fixing the grafts. In order to be able to harvest the branches in sufficient quantity, the emerging branches were bent downwards and fixed in this position. The fixed branches continued to grow in this position. This resulted in the development of strong, cross-branching branches that grew faster and led to the formation of a wide-span crown. From the horizontally fixed branches came vertical shoots, from which more could be harvested as the crown became wider. Lime bast used to be crucial and had various uses, including fruit tree grafting, making knitwear, clothing, shoes, and even war shields.

=== Festival and dance place ===
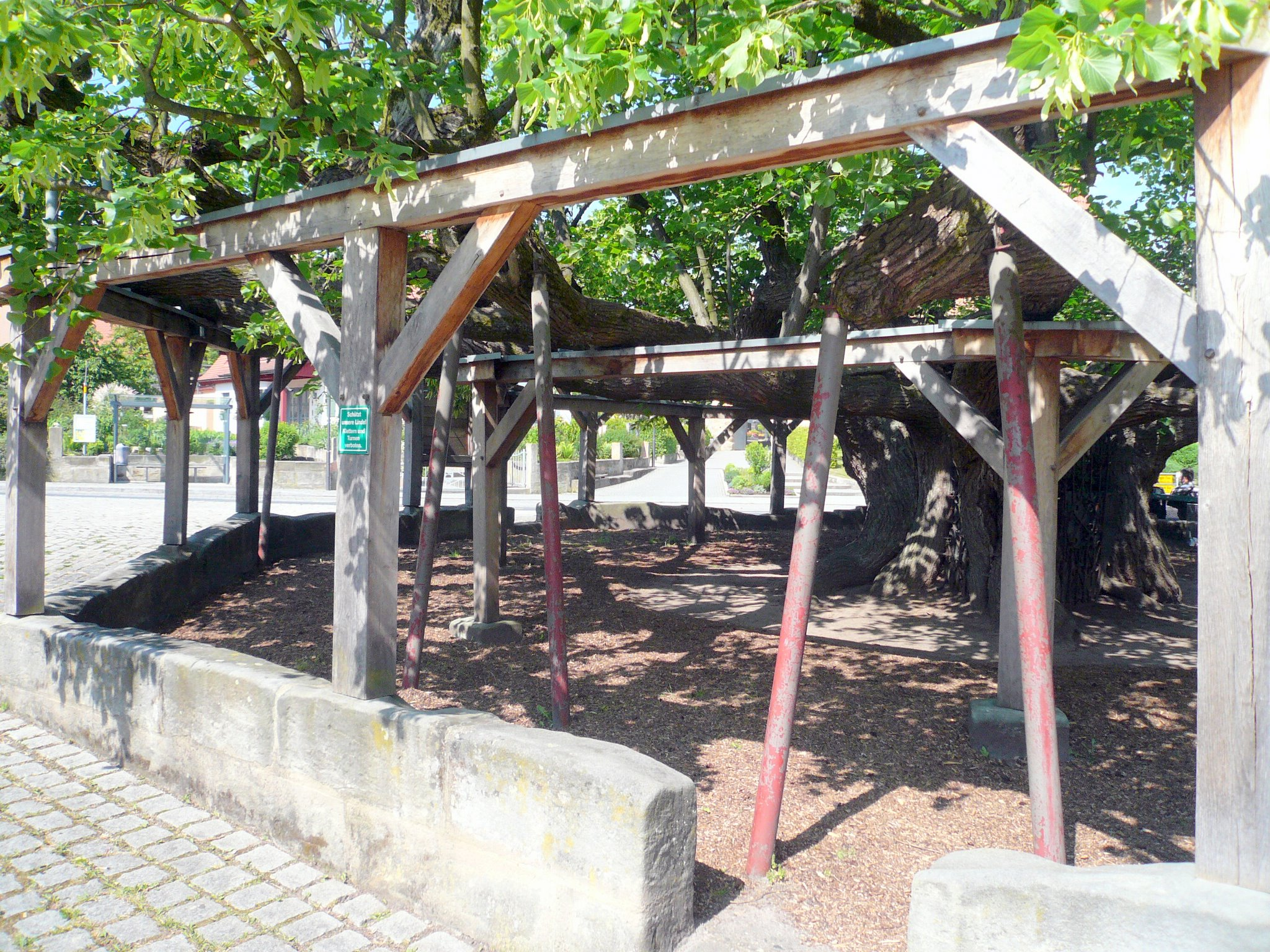
Stone wall and supports made of wood and iron

Throughout its history, the lime tree has served as a focal point for social gatherings. In the 19th century, the tree hosted a variety of festivities and events, including moonshine nights characterized by singing, music, and communal interactions. During the 1850s, "the local dignitaries met once a week during the summer to celebrate the so-called 'Mondscheinnächte' (Moonlight Nights) under the shade of the lime tree with music, singing, and leisurely entertainment.". The tree's appeal extended beyond the local community, attracting individuals from neighboring areas. Among the attendees were academic figures, such as students, professors, and even officers, often hailing from the nearby university town of Erlangen. This tradition of gatherings commenced in the mid-19th century and lasted until 1914. Prince Ludwig, who became King of Bavaria in 1913, visited Effeltrich on 12 June 1912, and a large party was held in his honor under the Linden tree. The children of the village danced in their colorful costumes under the Linden tree. The festivities subsided after the Second World War and the colorful, festive goings-on were gradually forgotten.

=== Redevelopment ===
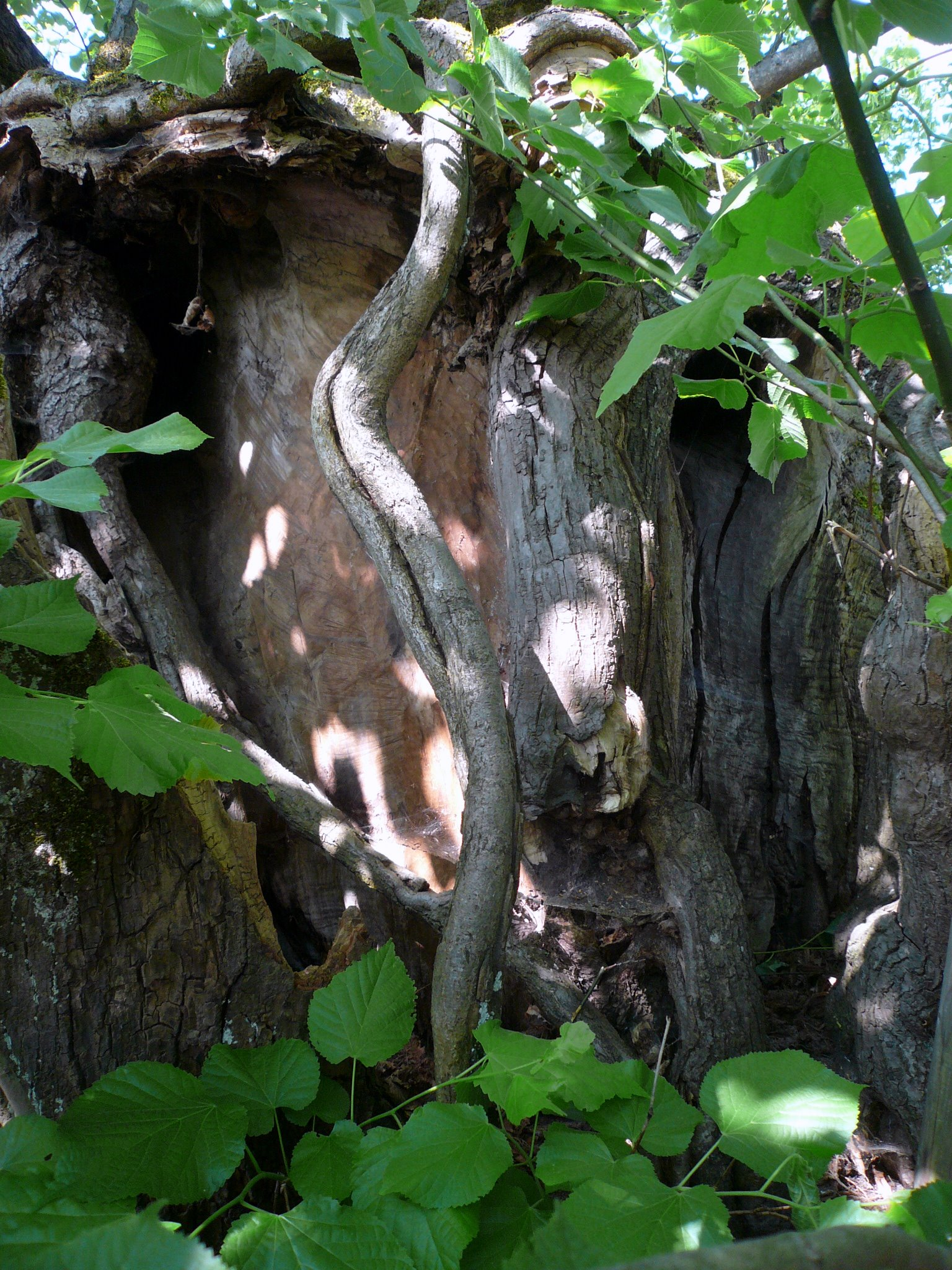
Adventitious root in the hollow trunk

Despite its hollow interior, the tree has maintained its good condition because it has always been cared for. Because of the increasingly stronger and heavier branches, these were supported from 1905 with a double oak framework by master carpenter Kaul from Poxdorf. This support system is composed of individual supports encircling the tree. Over the years, the tree underwent several rounds of restoration to safeguard its structural integrity. The tree underwent several renovations, such as in 1913 when its trunk, which had developed some hollow areas, was lined with bricks for structural support. However, prior permission had to be obtained from the Bamberg Conservation Committee for this sealing of the trunk. In order to seal the filled-in area, a cement coating was applied.

In 1947, the double oak framework from 1905 underwent renewal under the expertise of master builder Hans Batz from Effeltrich. Subsequent restoration efforts took place in 1968, and in 1971 the oak framework was repaired again. In 1977, very extensive renovations were carried out by the "tree doctor" Michael Maurer from Röthenbach an der Pegnitz. In the process, the tree seal, which had been affixed in 1913, was removed from the tree.

Recent improvements with regards to the surroundings of the tree outside the crown area were provided with a patchy pavement to ensure adequate water supply to the roots, which extend far from the trunk.

== See also ==
- Linde in Schenklengsfeld
