= Schenklengsfeld =

- Municipality
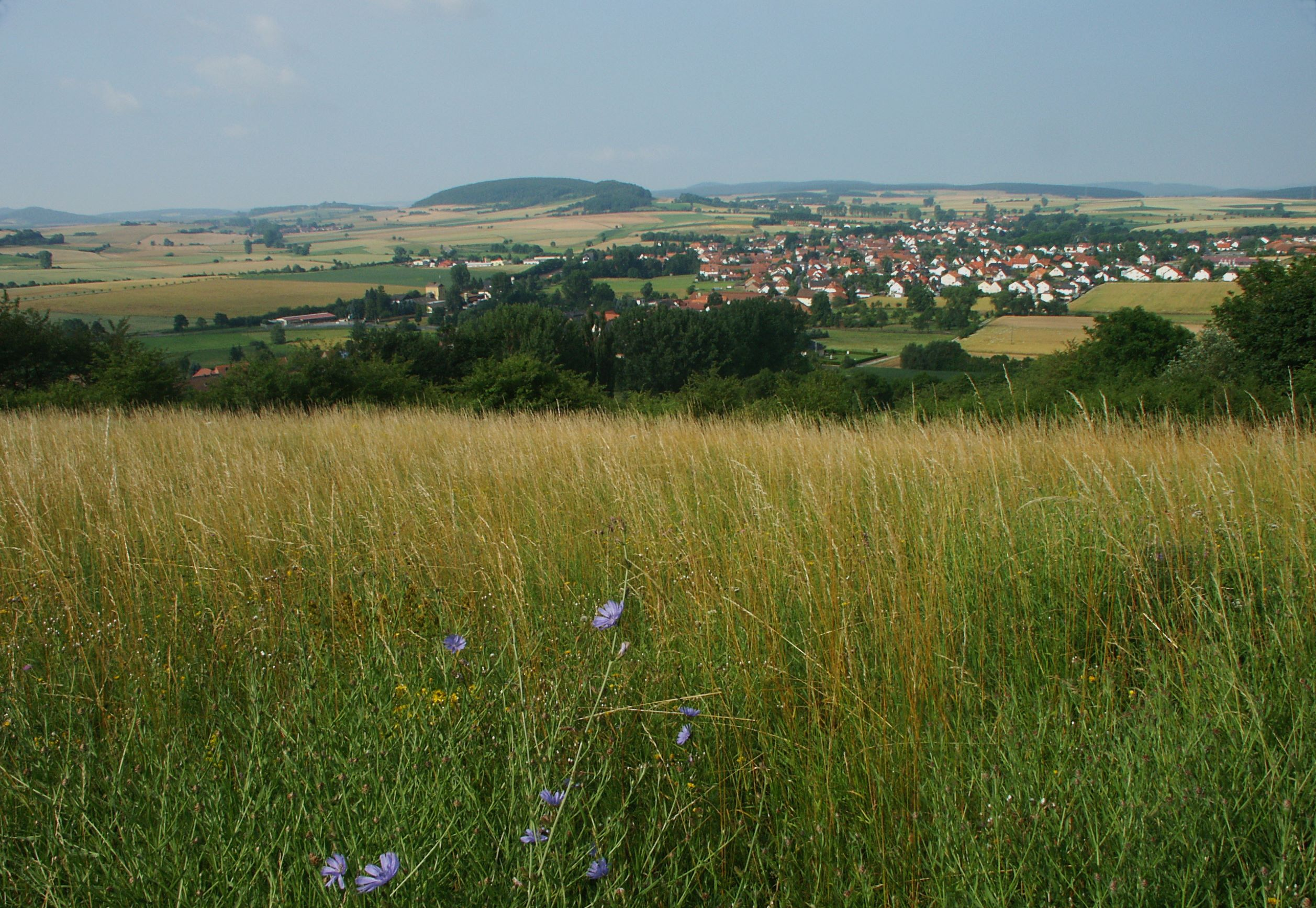

- Coat of arms

- Location of Schenklengsfeld within Hersfeld-Rotenburg district
- Interactive map of Schenklengsfeld
- Location within Germany Location within Hesse
- Coordinates: 50°49′4″N 9°50′37″E
- Country: Germany
- State: Hesse
- Admin. region: Kassel
- District: Hersfeld-Rotenburg
- Subdivisions: 14 districts

Government
  - Mayor (2023–29): Andre Wenzel

Area
  - Total: 63.78 km^{2} (24.63 sq mi)
- Elevation: 317 m (1,040 ft)

Population (2025-12-31)
  - Total: 4,202
  - Density: 65.88/km^{2} (170.6/sq mi)
- Time zone: UTC+01:00 (CET)
  - Summer (DST): UTC+02:00 (CEST)
- Postal codes: 36277
- Dialling codes: 06629
- Vehicle registration: HEF
- Website: www.schenklengsfeld.de

Schenklengsfeld is a municipality in Hersfeld-Rotenburg district in eastern Hessen, Germany lying roughly 30 km northeast of Fulda and 60 km southeast of Kassel.

== Geography ==
=== Location ===
The community of Schenklengsfeld lies in the outliers of the Kuppenrhön (range) between the Seulingswald (range) in the north and the Hessian Skittles (a range of volcanic mountains) in the south. Some 8 km west-northwest lies Bad Hersfeld and about 17 km south-southwest Hünfeld (each as the crow flies). It is found on a fertile plateau. In the west, the land slopes down to the Fulda and in the east to the Werra valley. Near Schenklengsfeld runs part of the watershed between these two rivers. Within community limits rises the small river Solz, which in Bad Hersfeld empties into the Fulda. Furthermore, the Ransbach, which near Philippsthal empties into the Werra, also begins here.

The community's lowest point lies on the Solz floodplain at 225 m above sea level. The highest point within community limits is the 510.9 m-high Landecker Berg.

=== Neighbouring communities ===
Schenklengsfeld borders in the north on the town of Bad Hersfeld and the community of Friedewald, in the east on the community of Hohenroda (all three in Hersfeld-Rotenburg), in the south on the community of Eiterfeld (in Fulda district) and in the west on the community of Hauneck (in Hersfeld-Rotenburg).

=== Constituent communities ===
The community's Ortsteile are Schenklengsfeld, Dinkelrode, Erdmannrode, Hilmes, Konrode, Lampertsfeld, Landershausen, Malkomes, Oberlengsfeld, Schenksolz, Unterweisenborn, Wehrshausen, Wippershain and Wüstfeld.

== History ==
About 800, Schenklengsfeld had its first documentary mention as Lengesfeld in Thuringia in the Hersfeld Abbey’s Breviarium Sancti Lulli (“Saint Lullus’s Summary”) and grew quickly into an Amt centre with a Vogtei, court and Amtmann. Moreover, gallows were mentioned in 1688. From 1648, Schenklengsfeld, along with the whole of the Amt of Landeck, belonged to the Landgraviate of Hesse-Kassel and was Reformed Protestant.

In 1455, near Lengsfeld in the Amt of Landeck, a healing spring was mentioned. Besides this one, two further ones sprang up in 1688. As of 23 April 1688, there was for several years a spa here with a pumphouse, overseen by a hydrotherapist Doctor Bachoff from Gotha.

The community had, beginning in 1912 – when it had 930 inhabitants – a railway link with the Hersfelder Kreisbahn to Bad Hersfeld and into the Werra valley to Heimboldshausen. Today, the former district railway's operating lands can only be seen at the old railway station. A preservation society has plans to open a museum railway here.

=== Amalgamations ===
The small community of Lampertsfeld was amalgamated with Schenklengsfeld early on, on 1 April 1962. The greater community came into being in 1971 and 1972 on the occasion of Hesse's municipal reform. On 1 February 1971, Konrode, Oberlengsfeld, Schenklengsfeld, Unterweisenborn and Wehrshausen were merged. On 31 December 1971 followed the communities of Dinkelrode, Landershausen, Malkomes and Schenksolz. On 1 August 1972 these were joined by the communities of Erdmannrode, Hilmes, Wippershain and Wüstfeld.

=== Population development ===
Year	1972	1975	1978	1981	1986	1989	1991	1993	1995	1997	2000	2001
Inhabitants	4,742	4,717	4,643	4,577	4,592	4,671	4,850	4,936	4,944	4,915	4,921	4,889

== Politics ==
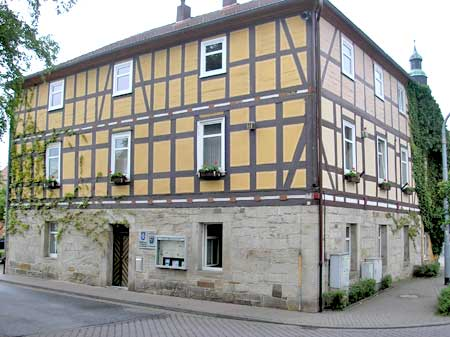
Town Hall

=== Community council ===
The municipal election held on 26 March 2006 yielded the following results:

Parties and voter communities		% 2006	Seats; 2006	% 2001	Seats; 2001
CDU	Christian Democratic Union of Germany	38.2	9	27.1	6
SPD	Social Democratic Party of Germany	50.5	12	62.7	14
FDP	Free Democratic Party	5.0	1	3.5	1
FWG	Freie Wählergemeinschaft Schenklengsfeld	6.4	1	–	–
FWG-Wipp.	Freie Wählergemeinschaft Wippershain	–	–	6.6	2
Total		100.0	23	100.0	23
Voter turnout in %		64.9		65.7	

The community's executive (Gemeindevorstand) is made up of six members, with four seats allotted to the SPD (Hans-Otto Burschel, Uwe Wolf, Dieter Kümmel, Peter Bock), and two to the CDU (Hans Heimeroth, Gunter Rexroth).

=== Mayors ===
Mayor Horst Hannich (SPD) was elected on 31 October 1999 with 86.0% of the vote. After 30 years in office, Hannich did not stand as a candidate in the mayoral election on 27 November 2005, but was named honorary mayor. In the runoff election, Stefan Gensler (CDU), with 51.1% of the vote, beat his opponent Werner Kümmel (SPD), who got 48.9% of the vote. Stefan Gensler took office on 2 May 2006. In 2017 Christoph Möller was elected mayor. Andre Wenzel (BL) won the 2023 mayoral election with 70.15% of the vote.

=== Coat of arms ===
The community's arms might be described thus: Argent a linden twig fourché vert with six leaves, in chief dexter a cross patée gules.

== Culture and sightseeing ==
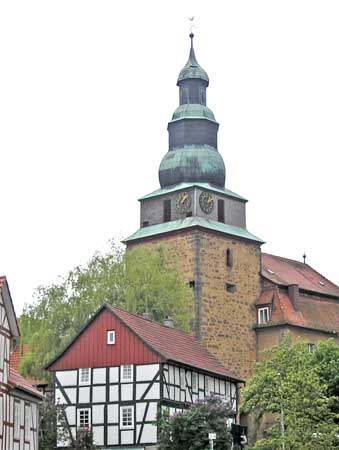
Saint Maurice's Evangelical Church

=== Museums ===
The Judaica Museum has been open since 1999 in Schenklengsfeld. It was set up in the former teacher's house of Schenklengsfeld's Jewish community as a memorial place. The house, built by the Jewish community in 1912, was thoroughly restored between 1996 and 1999 by the specially commissioned Förderkreis Jüdisches Lehrerhaus Schenklengsfeld e.V. (roughly “Society for the Promotion of the Jewish Teacher’s House of Schenklengsfeld”) and contains, besides two dwellings on the upper floors, a seminar room with a specialized library, as well as an exhibition room with exhibits on religion and history of Schenklengsfeld's Jewish minority, which in 1925 numbered 149 souls, thereby making up about 13% of the population. In the community were a synagogue, a Jewish elementary school and a Jewish graveyard, which still exists now and is worth seeing. The last Jews left in the summer of 1940. All together, 22 of the community's Jewish population, for whom a memorial stone was placed at the graveyard in November 1988, were murdered in the Holocaust.

=== Buildings ===
- Landeck Castle, on the Landecker Berg, built in the early 12th century by the abbots of Hersfeld Abbey and destroyed in the German Peasants' War
- Evangelical mother church of the parish of Schenklengsfeld, tower built in the 12th century and nave in 1736–1740. The Baroque cupola was added in 1822.
- Historic Schenklengsfeld graveyard and Jewish graveyard (Schenklengsfeld had until 1933 a major, independent Jewish community)

=== Natural monuments ===
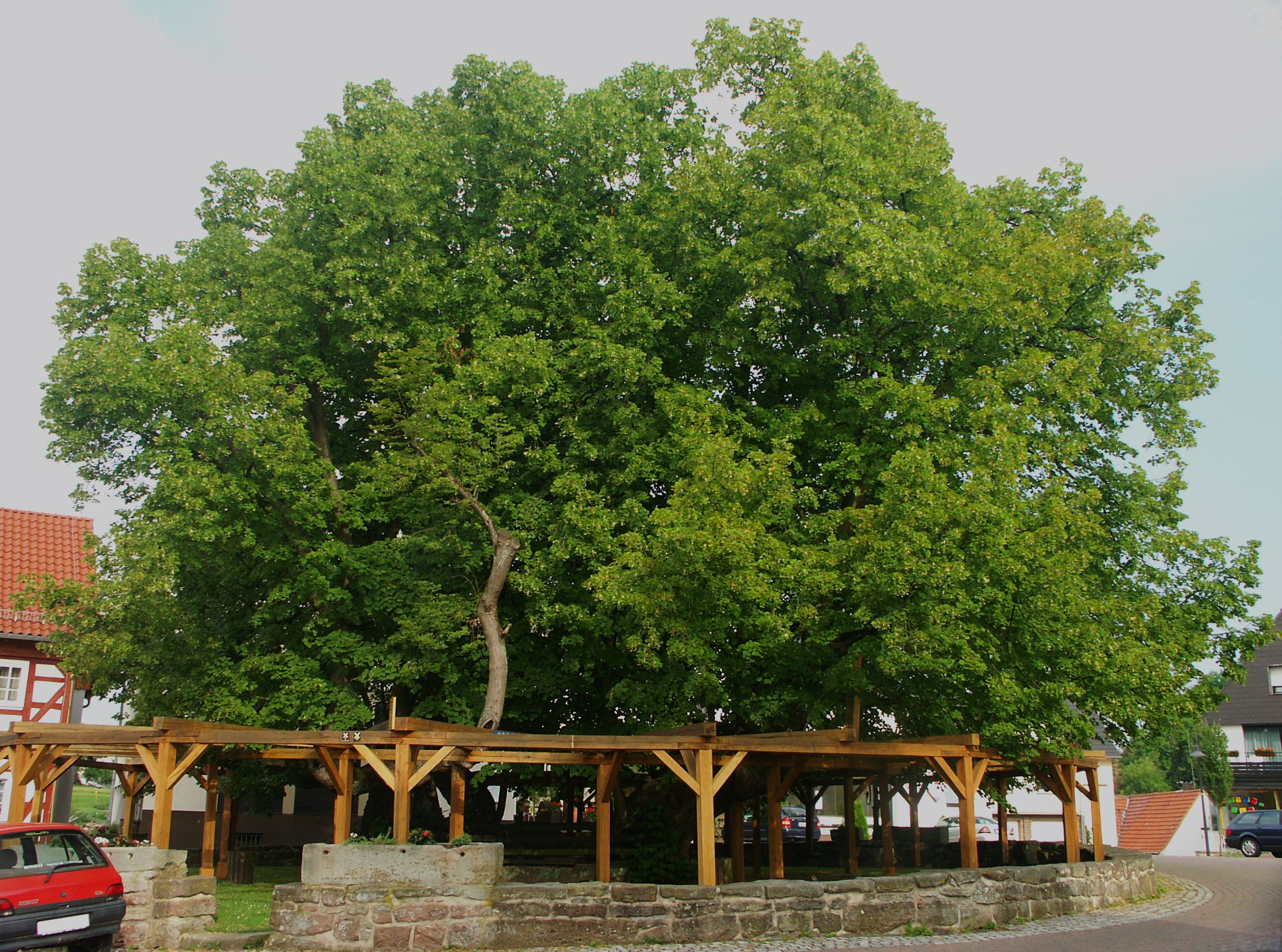
The more-than-1000-year-old Sommerlinde

A linden tree that is over a thousand years old stands on the former marketplace in Schenklengsfeld. According to the ARD programme Deutschlands älteste Bäume (“Germany’s Oldest Trees”), which was first broadcast on 23 April 2007, the tree, believed to be 1,120 years old, is Germany's oldest. There is a German article devoted to it.

=== Regular events ===
- Kuppenrhöner Landmarkt an der Linde (country market, every year on a Sunday in September)
- Lindenblütenfest an der Linde (“Linden Blossom Festival”, every other year on a weekend in June)

== Further images ==
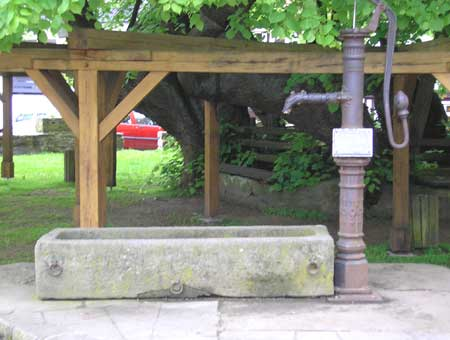
Saint George's Well before the thousand-year-old linden on the former marketplace pumps water from a depth of seven metres.

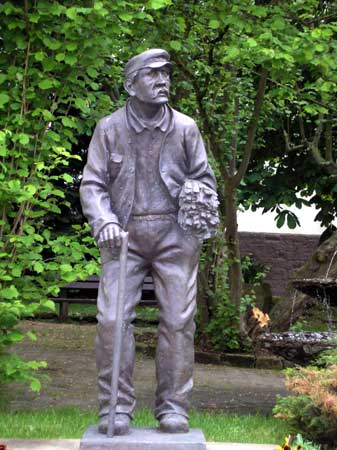
The "Strohhäischer", a humorous figure of the "Laenschelder", has stood since May 2001 across from Schenklengsfeld town hall.

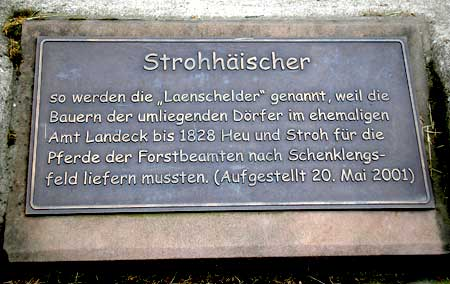
The bronze plaque at the Strohhäischer's monument explains how the nickname for Schenklengsfelders came to be. It reads: “So the ‘Laenschelder’ were named, because until 1828 the farmers of the surrounding villages in the former Amt of Landeck had to deliver hay and straw to Schenklengsfeld for the forestry officials’ horses.”

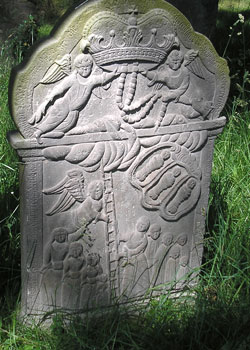
Gravestone from 1761 for a clergyman's wife at the historic graveyard, with Jacob's ladder and depictions of her 12 children.

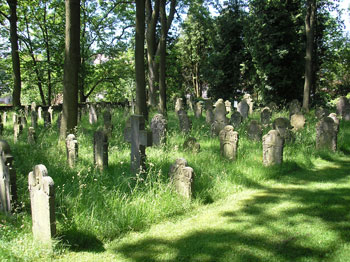
The Historic Graveyard with its roughly 270 gravestones from the 17th to 19th century shows the region's former funerary customs.

== See also ==
- Linde in Schenklengsfeld
