= Soisberg =

German Mountain

Coordinates: 50°47′18″N 9°53′00″E

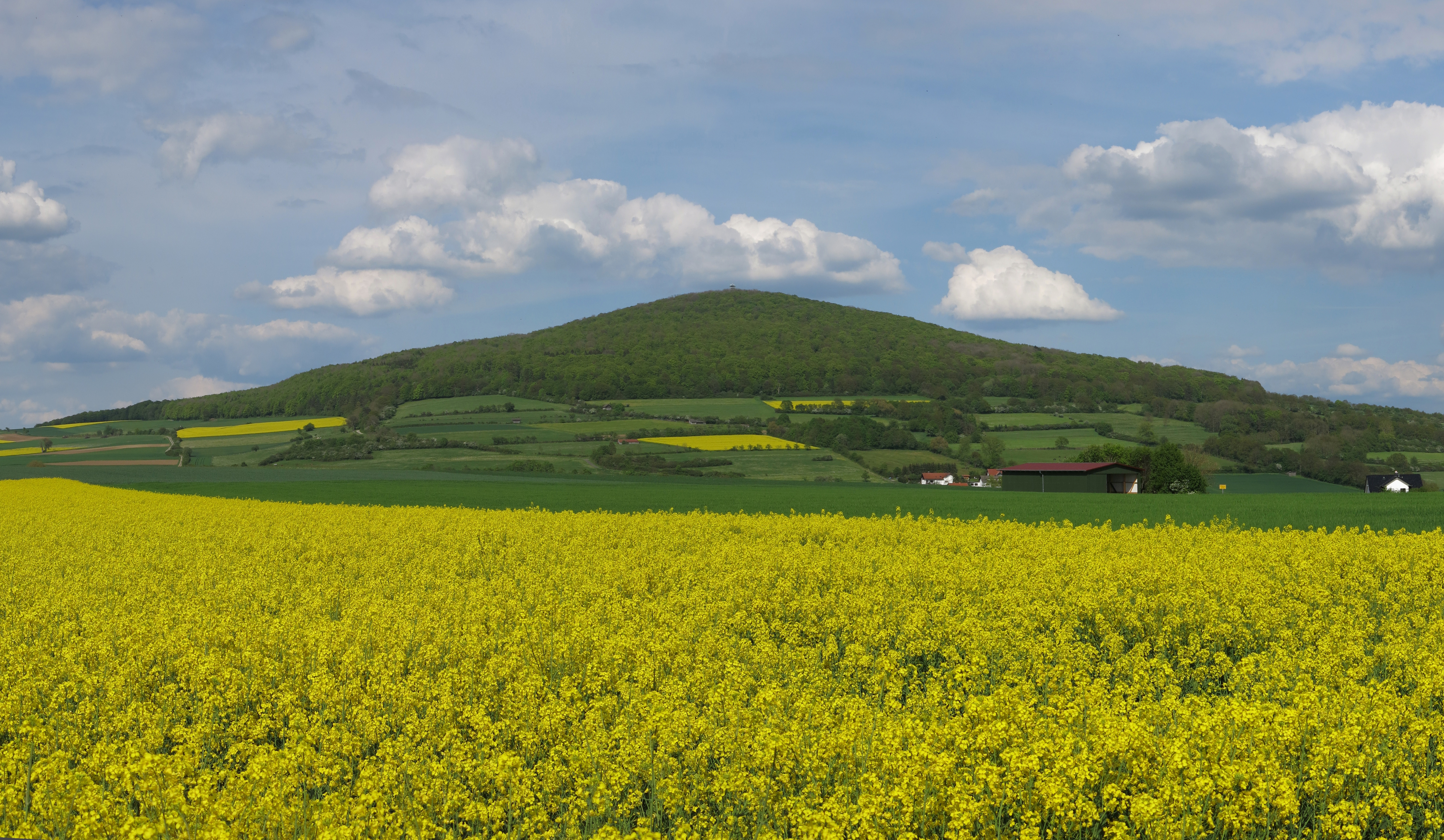
- Soisberg seen from southwest with a field of rapeseed (Brassica napus) in the foreground

Highest point
- Elevation: 629.9 m (2,067 ft)
- Prominence: 265 m (869 ft)
- Isolation: 10.21 km (6.34 mi)

Geography
- Location: Hesse, Germany

Soisberg is a mountain in Germany. It is located in the federal state of Hesse, in the central part of the country, approximately 300 km southwest of Berlin, the national capital. The Soisberg has an elevation of 630 metres above sea level, or 268 metres above the surrounding terrain. The base of the mountain is about 7.0 kilometres wide.
