= Stoppelsberg =

Mountain in Hesse, Germany

Coordinates: 50°45′05″N 9°42′06″E

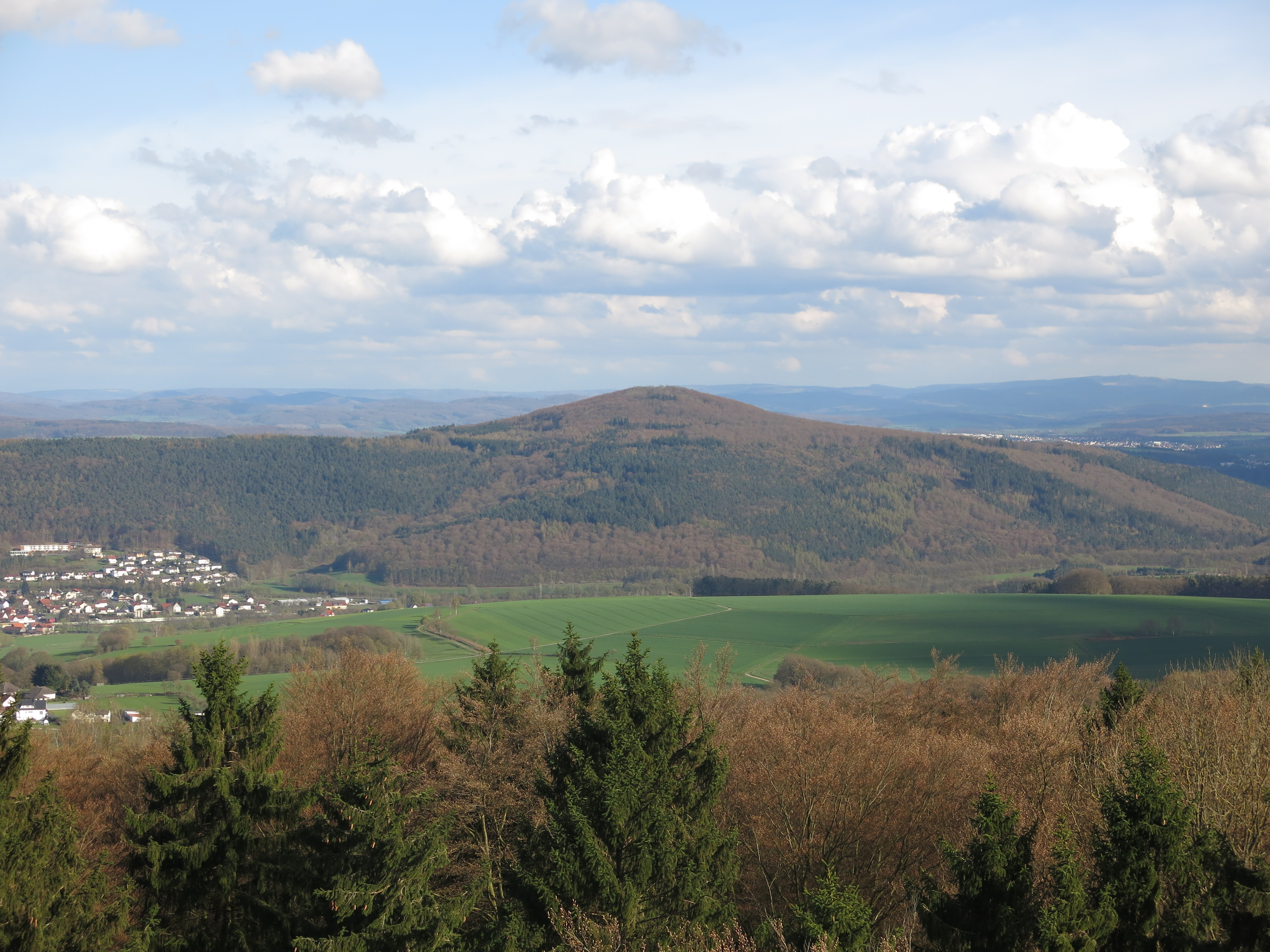
- View from the Heussner tower on the Mengshauser summit to the southeast to the Stoppelsberg.

Highest point
- Elevation: 523.9 m (1,719 ft)

Geography
- Location: Hesse, Germany

Stoppelsberg is a mountain of Hesse, Germany.
