= Morsberg =

Mountain in Hesse, Germany

Coordinates: 49°42′27″N 8°53′27″E

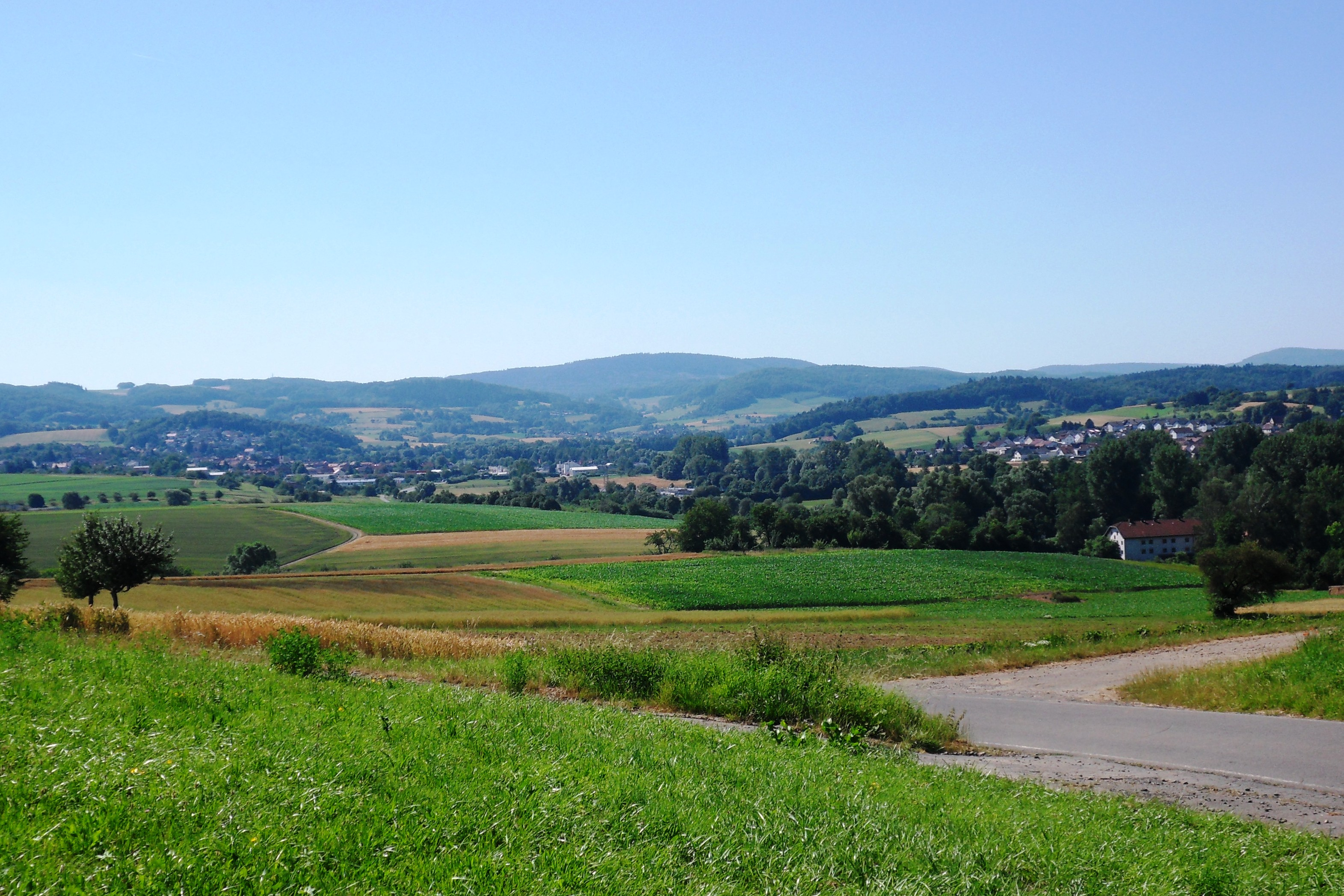
- View of Gersprenztal with Morsberg in the distant background.

Highest point
- Elevation: 466 m (1,529 ft)

Geography
- Location: Hesse, Germany

Morsberg is a hill in the Rhön range in Hesse, Germany.
