= Lichtberg =

Hill in Hesse, Germany

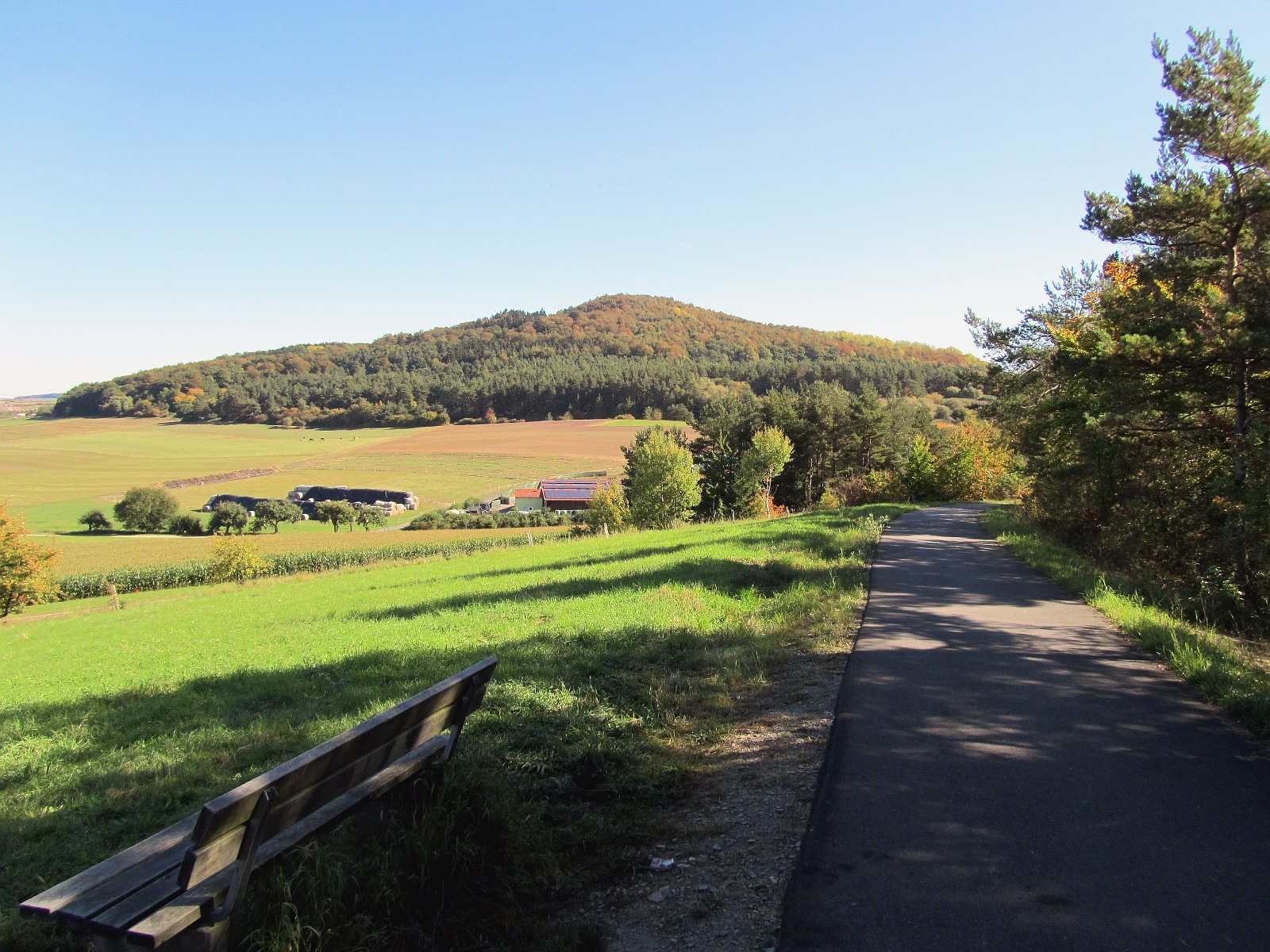

Highest point
- Elevation: 465 m (1,526 ft)
- Coordinates: 50°44′55″N 9°48′46″E

Geography
- Location within Hesse Location within Germany
- Location: Hesse, Germany

Lichtberg is a hill of Hesse, Germany.
