= Waldskopf =

Mountain in Germany

Coordinates: 49°32′N 8°46′E

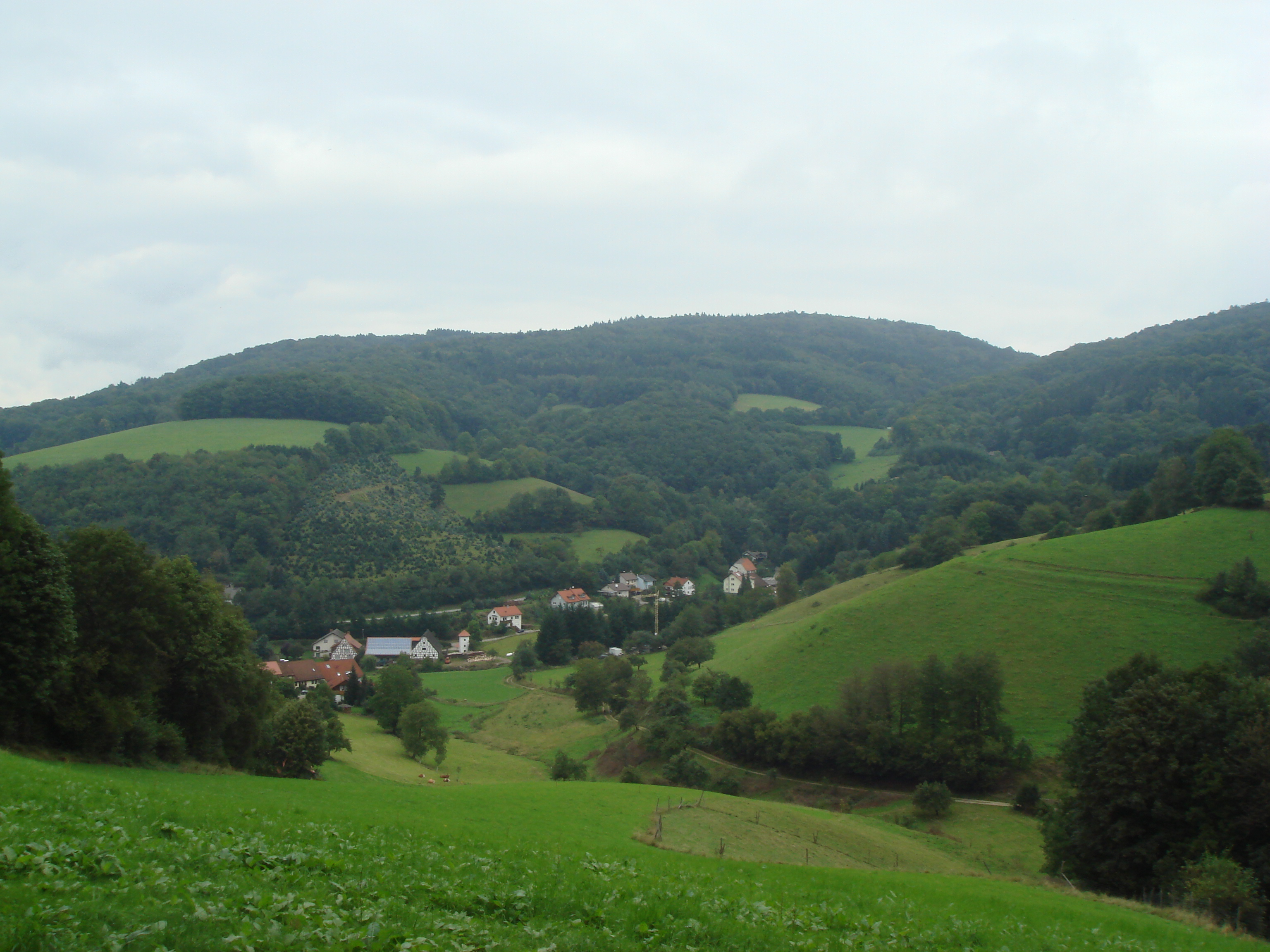
- View from the south over the Grundelbach valley and the homestead group Kundenbach, which belongs to Trösel, to the Waldskopf (538 m).

Highest point
- Elevation: 538 m (1,765 ft)

Geography
- Location: Hesse, Germany

Waldskopf is a Odenwald mountain in Hesse, Germany. It has a height of 538 metres.
