= Götzenstein =

- Location within Hesse Location within Germany

Highest point
- Elevation: 522 m (1,713 ft)
- Coordinates: 49°33′N 8°47′E

Geography
- Location: Hesse, Germany
- Parent range: Odenwald

The Götzenstein is a hill in the Odenwald range in Hesse, Germany.
