= Krähberg =

Hill in Hesse, Germany

Coordinates: 49°35′01″N 9°01′16″E

Highest point
- Elevation: 555 m (1,821 ft)

Geography
- Location: Hesse, Germany

Krähberg is a hill in the Odenwald range in Hesse, Germany.
