= Mühlbach (Schwarzbach) =

River in Germany

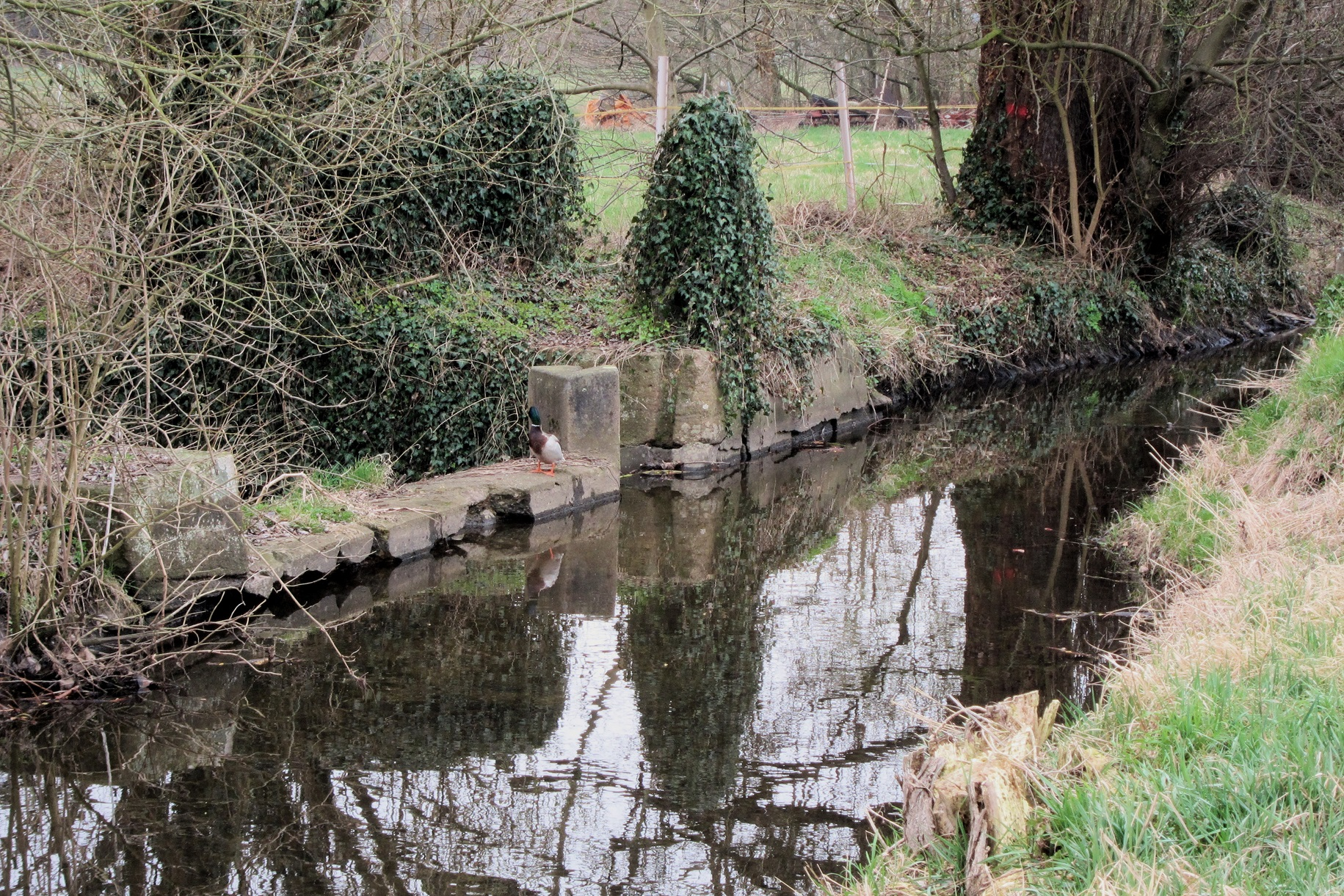

Location
- Country: Germany
- State: Hesse

Physical characteristics
- Mouth
  - location: Schwarzbach
  - coordinates: 49°55′49″N 8°26′28″E
- Length: 28.7 km (17.8 mi)

Basin features
- Progression: Schwarzbach→ Rhine→ North Sea

Mühlbach (in its upper course: Ruthsenbach) is a river of Hesse, Germany. It is a tributary of the Schwarzbach near Groß Gerau.

== See also ==
- List of rivers of Hesse
