= Siegfried Lemke =

German World War II fighter pilot

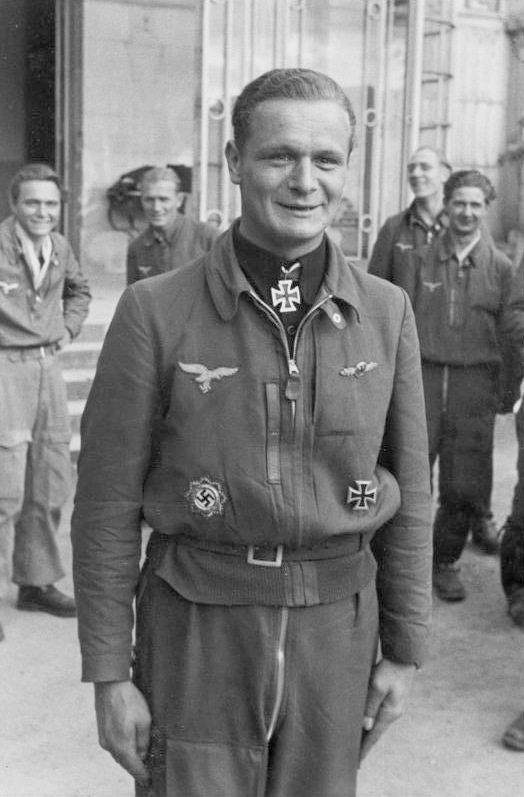
- Siegfried "Wumm" Lemke
- Born: 7 April 1921; Schivelbein
- Died: 18 December 1995 (aged 74); Worfelden, Germany
- Military career
- Allegiance: Nazi Germany
- Branch: Luftwaffe
- Rank: Hauptmann (captain)
- Nickname: "Wumm"
- Unit: JG 2
- Commands: III./JG 2
- Conflicts: World War II: Defense of the Reich; Operation Bodenplatte
- Awards: Knight's Cross of the Iron Cross

Siegfried "Wumm" Lemke (7 April 1921 – 18 December 1995) was a Luftwaffe ace and recipient of the Knight's Cross of the Iron Cross during World War II. The Knight's Cross of the Iron Cross, and its variants were the highest awards in the military and paramilitary forces of Nazi Germany during World War II. During his career he was credited with between 70 and 96 aerial victories.

== Biography ==
Lemke was born on 7 April 1921 in Schivelbein in Farther Pomerania, at the time in the Province of Pomerania within the Weimar Republic, present-day Świdwin, Poland. Following completion of flight and fighter pilot training, (Note: Flight training in the Luftwaffe progressed through the levels A1, A2 and B1, B2, referred to as A/B flight training. A training included theoretical and practical training in aerobatics, navigation, long-distance flights and dead-stick landings. The B courses included high-altitude flights, instrument flights, night landings and training to handle the aircraft in difficult situations.) Lemke was posted to the 1. Staffel (1st squadron) of Jagdgeschwader 2 "Richthofen" (JG 2—2nd Fighter Wing) in October 1942. He claimed his first aerial victory on 12 March 1943 when he downed a Royal Air Force (RAF) Supermarine Spitfire fighter near Fécamp. For this, he was awarded the Iron Cross 2nd Class (Eisernes Kreuz zweiter Klasse).

=== Squadron leader ===
On 1 January 1944, Lemke was officially appointed Staffelkapitän (squadron leader) of 1. Staffel of JG 2. He succeeded Leutnant Hugo Dahmer who had been injured on 11 September 1943. Since then, Lemke had inoffically led the Staffel as Staffelführer.

In late January 1944 following the Allied amphibious landing in Italy known as Operation Shingle, I. Gruppe under the command of Hauptmann Erich Hohagen was moved to Aix-en-Provence Aerodrome in southern France. There the unit fought against the 15th Air Force of the United States Army Air Forces (USAAF). On 9 February, Lemke engaged Spitfires from the 52nd Fighter Wing which were attacking shipping off the coast of France. During this encounter, Lemke claimed four Spitfires shot down. One of the pilots shot down was the American pilot Bob Hoover who was taken prisoner of war. In this engagement, Lemke also shot down Flight Officer James H. Montgomery and Lieutenant John L. Bishop, both pilots killed in action. Lemke's fourth claim did not lead to a loss by the Americans. His squadron were again transferred to Italy to counter the Allied landings at Anzio. In March, 1944 Lemke added sixteen further victories to his tally. The USAAF sent 200 Boeing B-17 Flying Fortress and 80 Consolidated B-24 Liberator bombers to the Rome marshalling yards on 3 March. The bombers were escorted by Republic P-47 Thunderbolt fighters of which two were shot down by Lemke.

In April, Lemke was awarded the German Cross in Gold (Deutsches Kreuz in Gold) after claiming 37 aerial victories. That month, he was also promoted to Leutnant (second lieutenant). By the early summer of 1944, Lemke's squadron was again moved, this time to Creil, an airfield north of Paris. From here Lemke flew combat missions over the developing campaign in Normandy following D-Day. On 14 June 1944, Lemke was awarded the Knight's Cross of the Iron Cross (Ritterkreuz des Eisernen Kreuzes) for his then tally of 44 aerial victories.

=== Group commander ===
In July 1944, Lemke was appointed Gruppenkommandeur (group commander) of the III. Gruppe of JG 2, replacing Hauptmann Josef Wurmheller who had been killed in action on 22 June. In consequence, command of 1. Staffel passed on to Leutnant Rudolf Wirtgen. The Gruppe flew its last combat mission from Creil, France on 19 August before they relocated to Königsberg in der Neumark, present-day Chojna, Poland, for a period of rest and replenishment. Their remaining aircraft were left in France and assigned to other units. At Königsberg in der Neumark, the Gruppe received factory new Fw 190 A-8/R6 aircraft. The Gruppe moved to Mohrin, present-day Moryń, on 5 October where training of the newly assigned pilots continued. Reaching operational readiness, Lemke relocated III. Gruppe to Altenstadt Airfield on 15 October.

Lemke led III. Gruppe during Operation Bodenplatte in their attack on Sint-Truiden airfield on 1 January 1945. Prior to the attack, he reported 40 Fw 190s operational, 34 of them Fw 190 Ds. However, only 28 of the 43 pilots in the unit were fit for operations and the formation fielded only 28 fighters. The attack turned out to be a disaster. III. Gruppe lost 19 Fw 190s and three were damaged, a loss rate of 79%. Nine pilots were killed, two were wounded and four were captured. While JG 2 moved to Bohemia in April 1945, III. Gruppe disappeared from German order of battle. It is said that Lemke led his surviving men north, though no record exists of the Gruppe movements. In the final days of the war, Lemke was nominated for the Knight's Cross of the Iron Cross with Oak Leaves (Ritterkreuz des Eisernen Kreuzes mit Eichenlaub) which were not awarded before the war ended.

== Later life ==
Lemke died on 18 December 1995 at the age of 74 in Worfelden, a municipality of Büttelborn, Germany.

== Summary of career ==
=== Aerial victory claims ===
According to US historian David T. Zabecki, Lemke was credited with 70 aerial victories. Spick lists him with 96 aerial victories claimed in 325 combat missions, and a mission-to-claim ratio of 3.39. This figure includes one claim on the Eastern Front and 95 claims on the Western Front of which 21 are four-engined heavy bombers. Mathews and Foreman, authors of Luftwaffe Aces — Biographies and Victory Claims, researched the German Federal Archives and state that Lemke was credited with more than 54 aerial victory claims, all of which claimed on the Western Front, including at least five four-engined bombers.

Victory claims were logged to a map-reference (PQ = Planquadrat), for example "PQ 14 West 4846". The Luftwaffe grid map (Jägermeldenetz) covered all of Europe, western Russia and North Africa and was composed of rectangles measuring 15 minutes of latitude by 30 minutes of longitude, an area of about 360 square miles (930 km^{2}). These sectors were then subdivided into 36 smaller units to give a location area 3 km × 4 km (1.9 mi × 2.5 mi) in size.

Chronicle of aerial victories
This and the ? (question mark) indicates information discrepancies listed by Prien, Stemmer, Rodeike, Bock, Mathews and Foreman.
Claim	Date	Time	Type	Location	Claim	Date	Time	Type	Location
– 1. Staffel of Jagdgeschwader 2 "Richthofen" – On the Western Front — 1 January – 31 December 1943
1	12 March 1943	13:10	Spitfire	20–25 km (12–16 mi) north of Fécamp	7	24 September 1943	17:08	Spitfire	Gisors; Crillon
2	17 May 1943	12:15	B-17	PQ 14 West 4846; 10 km (6.2 mi) southeast of Île de Groix	8	26 September 1943	12:48	P-51	PQ 05 Ost TC-7, east of Elbeuf
3	29 May 1943	16:23	B-17	15 km (9.3 mi) north of Saint-Malo; 10 km (6.2 mi) southwest of Saint-Nazaire	9	4 October 1943	17:33	Typhoon	9 km (5.6 mi) southeast of Champenard
4	4 July 1943	13:24	B-17	85 km (53 mi) west-southwest of Saint-Nazaire; PQ 14 West 4722	10	5 October 1943	14:21	P-51	PQ 05 Ost RC, north of Bolbec
5	6 September 1943	19:03	Spitfire	35 km (22 mi) northwest of Montdidier	11	19 October 1943	11:22	Typhoon	PQ 15 West UT-1, southwest of Bayeux
6	24 September 1943	12:05	Typhoon	9 km (5.6 mi) northwest of Honfleur					
– 1. Staffel of Jagdgeschwader 2 "Richthofen" – On the Western Front — 1 January – 20 February 1944
12	27 January 1944	11:01	Spitfire	PQ 04 Ost S/DN-1; Hyères, Marseille	16	9 February 1944	14:50	Spitfire	PQ 04 Ost S/CP-2/2 southeast of Cannes
13	27 January 1944	11:13	Spitfire	Hyères	17	9 February 1944	14:54	Spitfire	PQ 04 Ost S/CP-3 southeast of Cannes
14	27 January 1944	11:17	Spitfire	Hyères	18	9 February 1944	15:00	Spitfire	PQ 04 Ost S/CP-9 southeast of Cannes
15	4 February 1944	14:27? (Note: According to Mathews and Foreman claimed at 14:25.)	B-17	PQ 04 Ost S/EM-8; 100 km (62 mi) south of Nice	19	9 February 1944	16:35	Spitfire	PQ 04 Ost S/CQ-5/8 southeast of Cannes
– 1. Staffel of Jagdgeschwader 2 "Richthofen" – In Italy — 20 February – 8 April 1944
20	29 February 1944	17:10	Spitfire	2 km (1.2 mi) northeast of Nettuno	29	14 March 1944	11:37	B-26	5 km (3.1 mi) northwest of Rome
21	29 February 1944	17:22	Spitfire	20 km (12 mi) southwest of the Tiber estuary 5 km (3.1 mi) south-southwest of Cisterna di Latina	30	17 March 1944	06:57	Spitfire	12 km (7.5 mi) west of Cape Anzio
22	3 March 1944	11:51	P-47	Valentano	31	17 March 1944	07:23	Spitfire	5 km (3.1 mi) south of Marsciano
23	3 March 1944	11:53	P-47	5 km (3.1 mi) north of Farnese	32	18 March 1944	09:11	Spitfire	5 km (3.1 mi) northwest of Mignano Monte Lungo
24	7 March 1944	09:47? (Note: According to Mathews and Foreman claimed at 09:45.)	Spitfire	5 km (3.1 mi) northeast of Nettuno	33	18 March 1944	17:36	Spitfire	10 km (6.2 mi) west of Frosinone
25	7 March 1944	09:57	Spitfire	15 km (9.3 mi) west of Nettuno	34	19 March 1944	07:50	Spitfire	5 km (3.1 mi) west of Montalto di Castro
26	7 March 1944	12:22	B-24	55 km (34 mi) southwest of Tarquinia	35	19 March 1944	09:53	Spitfire	20 km (12 mi) west of Tarquinia
27	10 March 1944	10:15	P-51	5 km (3.1 mi) north of Rome	36	19 March 1944	10:02	Spitfire	20 km (12 mi) west of Montalto di Castro
28	11 March 1944	07:20	Spitfire	20 km (12 mi) northeast of Nettuno	37	2 April 1944	13:37	P-39	7 km (4.3 mi) southwest of Montalto di Castro
– 1. Staffel of Jagdgeschwader 2 "Richthofen" – On the Western Front — 8 April – July 1944
38	9 May 1944	09:35? (Note: According to Mathews and Foreman claimed at 09:33.)	P-38	30 km (19 mi) northwest of Nancy	44	12 June 1944	10:47	Typhoon	PQ 05 Ost UA-7 vicinity of Lisieux
39	30 May 1944	11:35	P-51	PQ 04 Ost N/CK-4/5; Doulevant-le-Château	45	14 June 1944	06:45	Typhoon	PQ 05 Ost UC-2/1 vicinity of Évreux
40	7 June 1944	06:12	Spitfire	3 km (1.9 mi) southeast of Tilly	46	15 June 1944	06:42	Spitfire	PQ 05 Ost UC-8 vicinity of Évreux
41	7 June 1944	06:18	P-47	8 km (5.0 mi) northeast of Bayeux	47	15 June 1944	06:44	Spitfire	PQ 05 Ost UC-8/PQ 04 Ost N/AC-2 vicinity of Évreux/Dreux
42	7 June 1944	19:13	P-47	PQ 15 West UT-3, Caen; 15 km (9.3 mi) east of Caen	48	16 June 1944	19:50	P-51	PQ 05 Ost UA-3 vicinity of Lisieux
43	8 June 1944	06:17	P-51	PQ 04 Ost N/AD-7/BD-1 southeast of Dreux					
– Stab III. Gruppe of Jagdgeschwader 2 "Richthofen" – On the Western Front — July – 31 December 1944
49	19 August 1944	09:09? (Note: According to Mathews and Foreman claimed at 09:03.)	Typhoon	PQ 04 Ost N/AC-4/5 vicinity of Dreux	52	17 December 1944	11:37	Tempest	PQ 05 Ost PO; Eifel
50	20 October 1944	09:11	P-38	PQ 05 Ost S/NG-5/8 east of Cologne-Bonn	53	23 December 1944	14:49	P-47	PQ 05 Ost NO southwest of Cologne
51	20 October 1944	15:08	P-47	PQ 05 Ost S/QP-1 east of Cologne-Bonn	54	23 December 1944	14:51	P-47	PQ 05 Ost NO southwest of Cologne

=== Awards ===
- Iron Cross (1939) 2nd and 1st Class
- Honor Goblet of the Luftwaffe on 8 May 1944 as Fahnenjunker-Oberfeldwebel and pilot (Note: According to Obermaier on 31 March 1944.)
- German Cross in Gold on 3 April 1944 as Fahnenjunker-Oberfeldwebel in the 1./Jagdgeschwader 2
- Knight's Cross of the Iron Cross on 14 June 1944 as Leutnant and Staffelführer of the 1./Jagdgeschwader 2 "Richthofen" (Note: According to Scherzer on 11 June 1944 as Staffelführer in the I./Jagdgeschwader 2 "Richthofen".)

== Notes ==
Military offices
Preceded by Hauptmann Josef Wurmheller	Commander of III. Gruppe of Jagdgeschwader 2; 23 June 1944 – 8 May 1945	Succeeded by None
