= Gundbach =

River in Germany

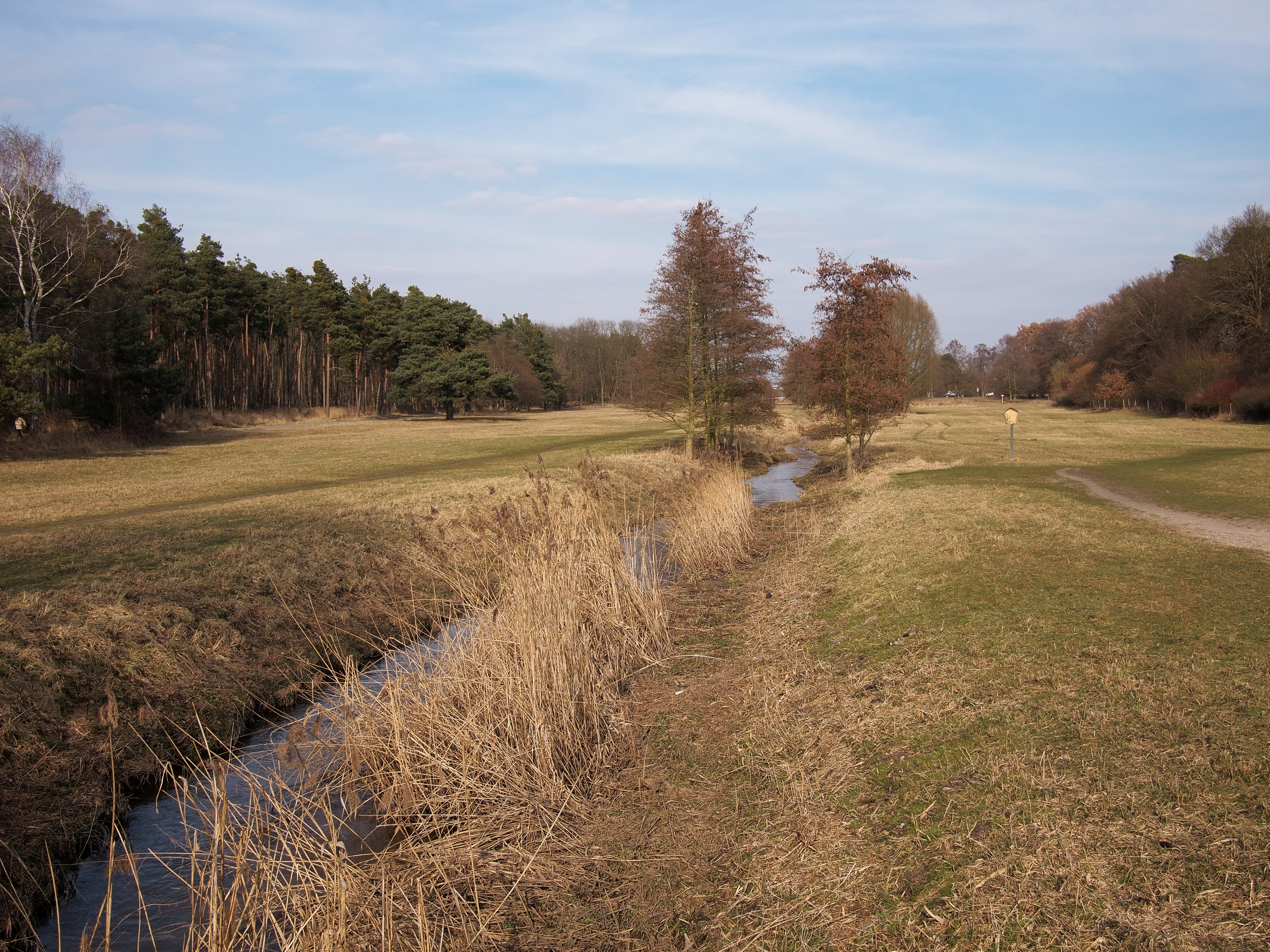

Location
- Country: Germany
- State: Hesse

Physical characteristics
- Mouth
  - location: Schwarzbach
  - coordinates: 49.9771°N 8.5062°E
- Length: 22.9 km (14.2 mi)

Basin features
- Progression: Schwarzbach→ Rhine→ North Sea

Gundbach is a river of Hesse, Germany. At its confluence with the Geräthsbach west of Mörfelden-Walldorf, the Schwarzbach is formed.

== See also ==
- List of rivers of Hesse
