= Meiereibach =

Meiereibach may refer to:

- Meiereibach (Darmbach), a river of Hesse, Germany
- Meiereibach (Mühlenau), a river of Schleswig-Holstein, Germany
