= Meiereibach (Darmbach) =

River in Hesse, Germany

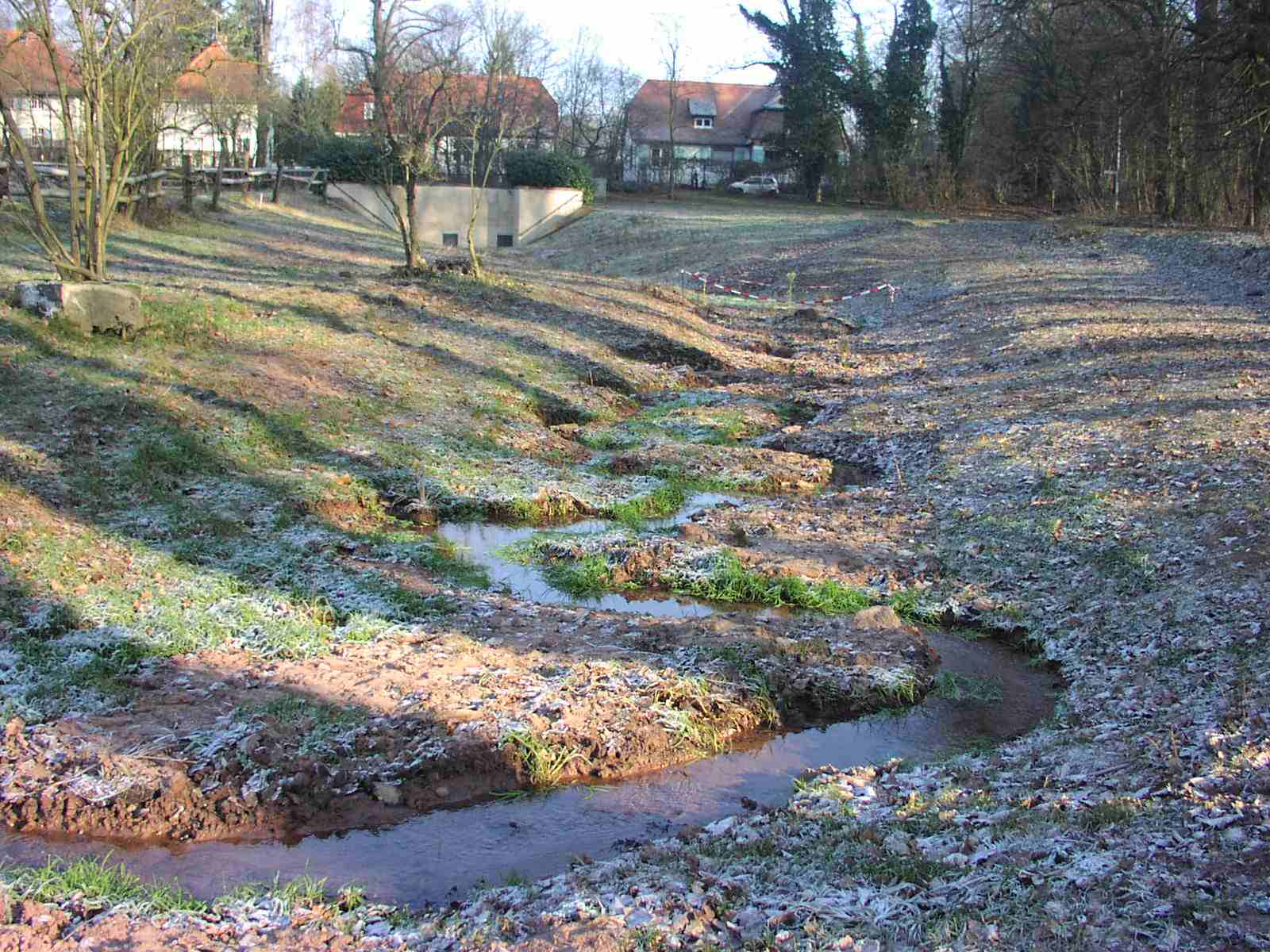

Location
- Country: Germany
- States: Hesse

Physical characteristics
- Mouth
  - location: Darmbach
  - coordinates: 49.8703°N 8.6778°E

Basin features
- Progression: Darmbach→ Schwarzbach→ Rhine→ North Sea

Meiereibach is a small river of Hesse, Germany. It flows into the Darmbach in Darmstadt.

== See also ==
- List of rivers of Hesse
