= Nöttingen =

- Ortsteil of Remchingen
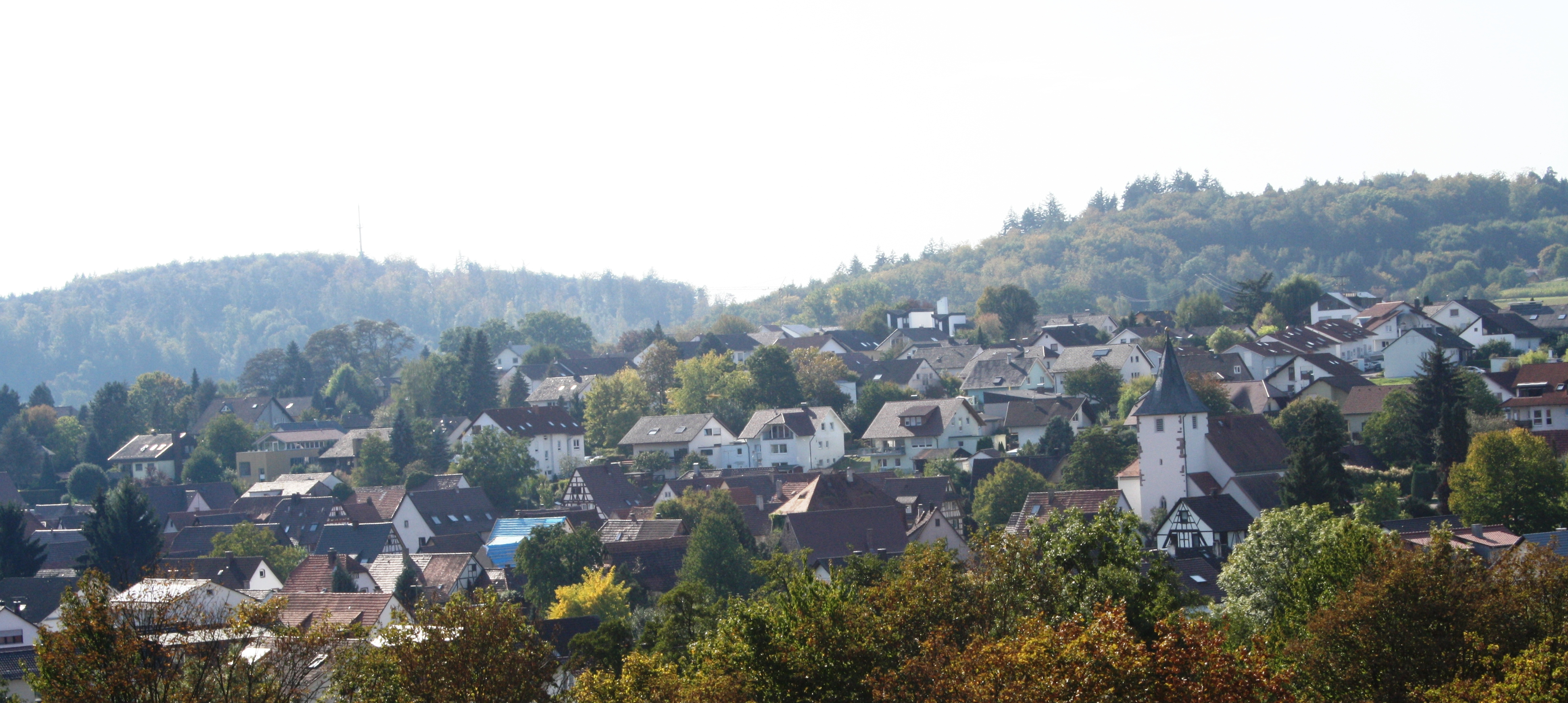

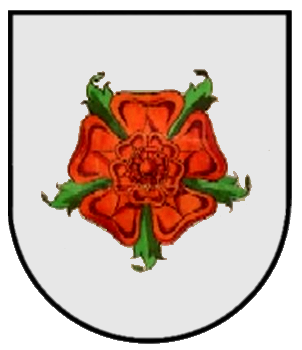
- Coat of arms
- Interactive map of Nöttingen
- Location within Germany Location within Baden-Württemberg
- Coordinates: 48°55′48.4″N 8°34′9.14″E
- Country: Germany
- State: Baden-Württemberg
- District: Enzkreis
- Municipality: Remchingen

Area
  - Total: 9.67 km^{2} (3.73 sq mi)
- Elevation: 167 m (548 ft)

Population (2022)
  - Total: 2,501
  - Density: 259/km^{2} (670/sq mi)
- Time zone: UTC+01:00 (CET)
  - Summer (DST): UTC+02:00 (CEST)
- Postal codes: 75196
- Dialling codes: 07232
- Vehicle registration: PF
- Website: remchingen.de/nöttingen

Nöttingen is a district of the southwestern German municipality of Remchingen in the Enzkreis district and is located exactly between Pforzheim and Karlsruhe, which is why the place was an important transit point in history. The church of St. Martin bears witness to this. Until the municipal reform, which came into force on January 1, 1975, Nöttingen was an independent municipality together with the smallest district Darmsbach and the houses Dietenhäuser Mühle. Today 2500 people live in the village.

== Culture and sights ==
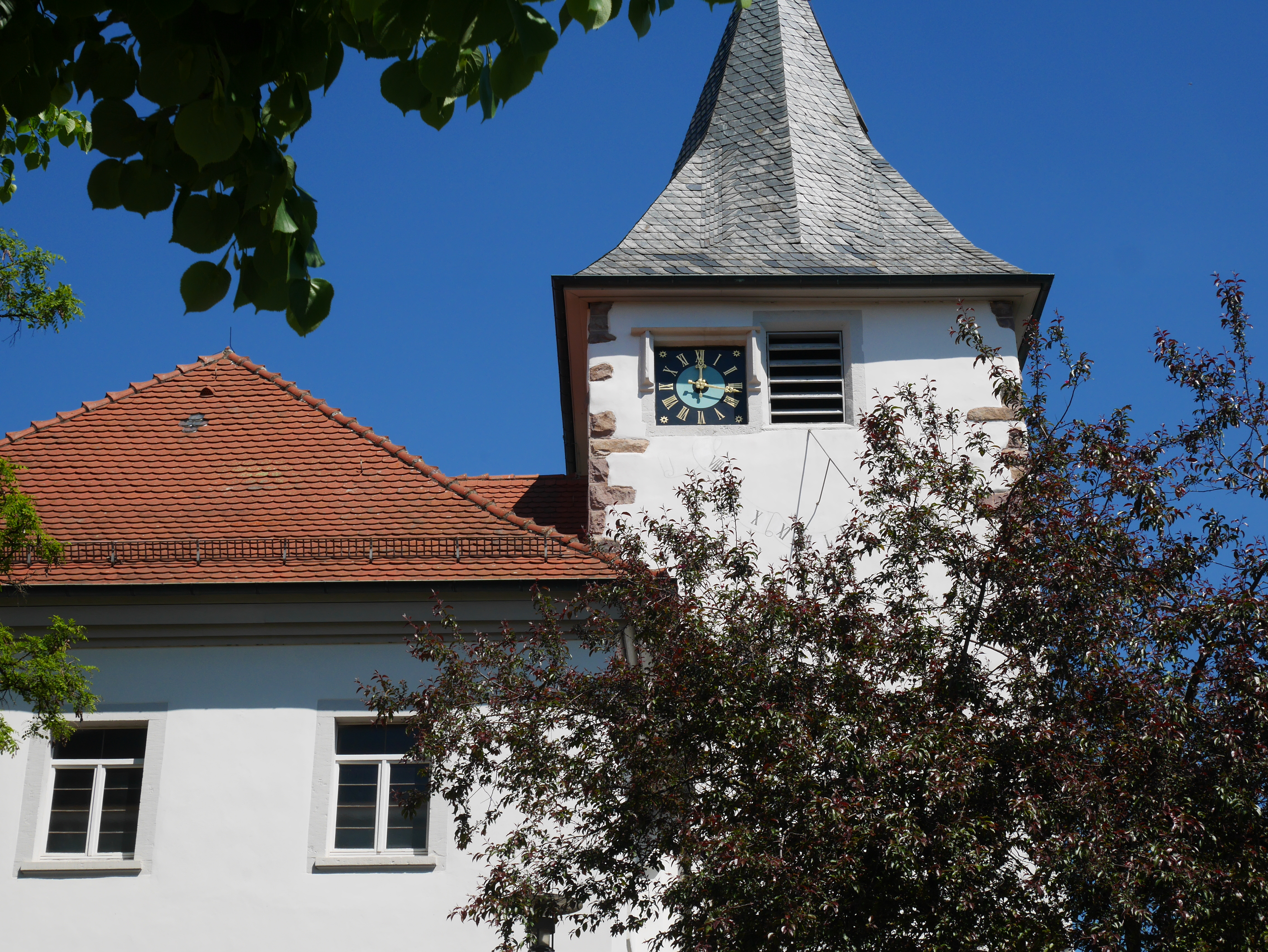
St. Martin Church

=== Martinskirche ===
The first documented mention of Martinskirche (St. Martin's Church) in Nöttingen was in 1170. The church tower is built on the remains of a Roman watchtower, an indication that the village of Nöttingen was already populated in Roman times. The patrocinium of St. Martin points to the preferred Frankish saint in the period from the 7th-9th centuries (cf. St. Martin in the old town of Pforzheim). St. Martin's churches, as here, were usually built on the site of Gallo-Roman sanctuaries or on the foundations of secular buildings. In 1609 the church was remodeled and enlarged, and in 1785 it was expanded again. During a restoration of the church in 1936, especially the choir room was renovated and redesigned. The corner ashlars, which have been uncovered today, and the colorful contrast of the window jambs were restored in 2006 according to the historical model, as was the sundial. Nöttingen's church is considered the oldest church in the area.

== Sport ==
The local soccer club FC Nöttingen played in the 2004/05 season in the then third-tier Regionalliga Süd, after several years in the Oberliga Baden-Württemberg, Nöttingen returned to the Regionalliga, now the fourth division in the German league system, for the 2014/15 season, but was immediately relegated again. In 2016/17, they competed again in the Regionalliga, followed by relegation once again. The venue is the Kleiner Arena.

The trampoline department of Turnverein Nöttingen competes in the Trampoline Bundesliga, while the gymnastics department forms a gymnastics team with TB Wilferdingen in the Oberliga Baden-Württemberg.

== Education ==
There is the Bertha-Benz primary school in Nöttingen.

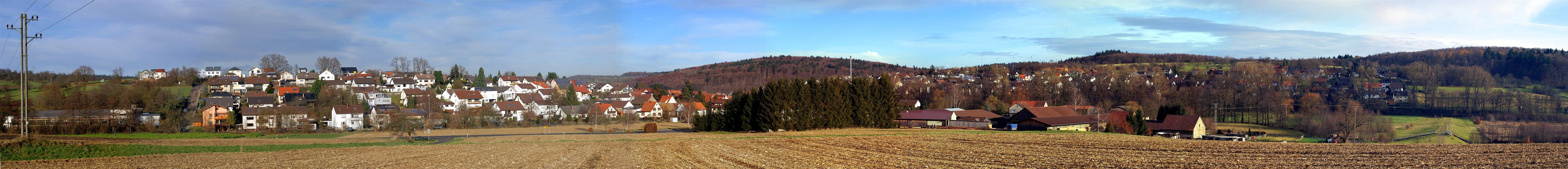
Panorama
