= Bertha-Benz-Schule =

Bertha-Benz School
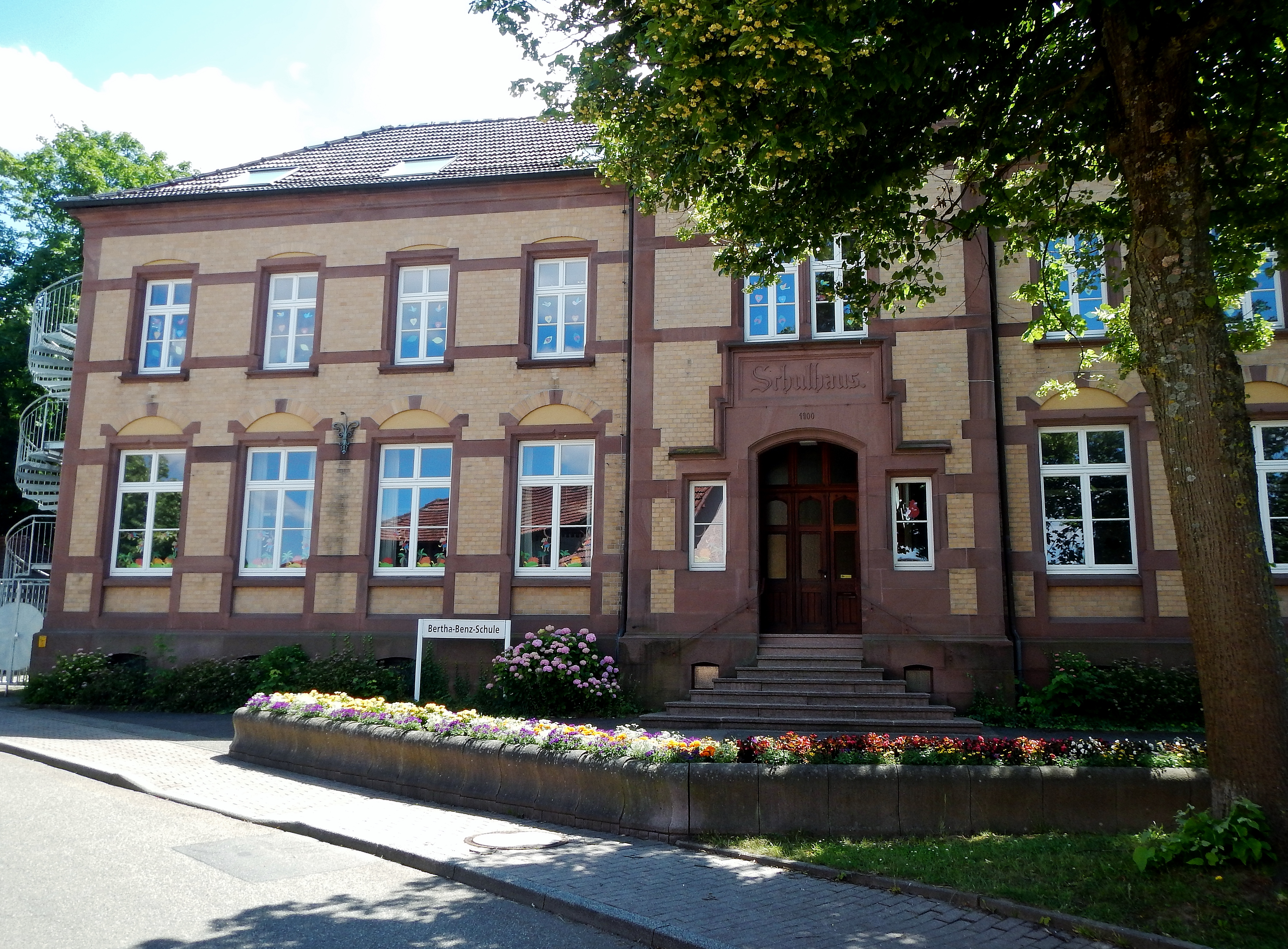
- The school in 2015

Location
- Ellmendinger Straße 25; Nöttingen, Remchingen; Baden-Württemberg, 75196; Germany
- Coordinates: 48°55′43.3″N 8°34′19.4″E

Information
- Type: Primary school
- Founded: 1900
- Principal: Astrid Hildenbrand
- Teaching staff: 11
- Enrollment: 126
- Color
- Website: www.bertha-benz-schule.de

The Bertha-Benz School (German: Bertha-Benz-Schule) is a primary school in Remchingen-Nöttingen, Baden-Württemberg, Germany. The two-storey solid construction was built in 1900. The school building is a cultural heritage monument and is protected as an example of school architecture around 1900.

== Architecture and history ==
The building is a two-storey masonry structure with a central risalit topped by a gable. The façade combines red sandstone elements with yellow brickwork. Particularly striking are the ornamental wall anchors, which give the building a neo-Gothic character. The year "1900" on the risalit indicates the year of construction.

In front of the main entrance there is a historic pump well with a sandstone trough, a cast iron fountain column, and a hand pump. This well once supplied the school with drinking water from a deep well.

=== Extension ===
In the 2000s, the school was extended with a new building containing four more classrooms. The new section is connected by a walkway. Behind it there is a schoolyard with a storage shed, a play sculpture, and climbing equipment. In 2013, a fire escape staircase was added.

== School operation ==
The Bertha-Benz School is a public primary school with currently about 126 pupils. It also offers day care, homework supervision, holiday programs, and school meals. In addition, it provides school social work.

=== Support association ===
The support association "Sprössling e. V.", founded in 1997, assists the school with various projects.

== Name ==
The school is named after Bertha Benz (1849–1944), the wife of Carl Benz and a pioneer of the automobile. In 1888, Bertha Benz made the first long-distance journey in an automobile, passing through Remchingen on what is now called the Bertha Benz Memorial Route.
