= Hugo Dahmer =

German flying ace (1918–2006)

- Born: 7 May 1918; Koblenz
- Died: 1 August 2006 (aged 88); Troisdorf
- Military career
- Allegiance: Nazi Germany (to 1945); West Germany
- Branch: Luftwaffe; German Air Force
- Service years: 1938–1944; 1956–1974
- Rank: Oberleutnant (Wehrmacht); Oberstleutnant (Bundeswehr)
- Units: JG 26, JG 77, JG 5, JG 2
- Commands: 1./JG 2
- Conflicts: World War II: Eastern Front; Defense of the Reich
- Awards: Knight's Cross of the Iron Cross

Hugo Dahmer (7 May 1918 – 1 August 2006) was a German Luftwaffe military aviator during World War II, a fighter ace credited with 45, potentially 57, enemy aircraft shot down in 307 combat missions. This figure includes 26 aerial victories on the Eastern Front, and at least 19 victories over the Western Allies, including four four-engined bombers.

Born in Koblenz, Dahmer served with Jagdgeschwader 26 "Schlageter" (JG 26th—26th Fighter Wing) during the Battle of France and Battle of Britain. He claimed his first aerial victory on 16 May 1940. In early 1941, he was transferred to I. Gruppe (1st group) of Jagdgeschwader 77 (JG 77—77th Fighter Wing) which was based in Norway. When Germany launched Operation Barbarossa, the German invasion of the Soviet Union, he claimed further aerial victories over the Soviet Air Forces and was awarded the Knight's Cross of the Iron Cross in July 1941. In late 1942, Dahmer was transferred to Jagdgeschwader 2 "Richthofen" (JG 2—2nd Fighter Wing) which was fighting on the Western Front. On 17 August 1943, Dahmer was appointed Staffelkapitän (squadron leader) of 1. Staffel of JG 2. He was severely injured in aerial combat on 11 September 1943. He never returned to combat operations, serving the rest of the war as an instructor. Following World War II, he served in the newly established West Germany's Air Force in the Bundeswehr. Dahmer died on 1 August 2006 in Troisdorf.

== Career ==
Dahmer was born on 7 May 1918 in Koblenz, at the time in the Rhine Province within the German Empire. Following flight training, (Note: Flight training in the Luftwaffe progressed through the levels A1, A2 and B1, B2, referred to as A/B flight training. A training included theoretical and practical training in aerobatics, navigation, long-distance flights and dead-stick landings. The B courses included high-altitude flights, instrument flights, night landings and training to handle the aircraft in difficult situations.) he was posted to II. Gruppe (2nd group) of Jagdgeschwader 234 "Schlageter" (JG 234—234th Fighter Wing). On 16 August 1938, Dahmer crashed Messerschmitt Bf 109 D-1 (Werknummer 447—factory number), the aircraft assigned to the Gruppenkommandeur (group commander) Oberstleutnant Eduard Ritter von Schleich, on a maintenance flight near Düsseldorf. On 1 November, this Gruppe became II. Gruppe of Jagdgeschwader 132 "Schlageter" (JG 132—132nd Fighter Wing). On 1 May 1939, II. Gruppe of JG 132 was again renamed, receiving its final designation of II. Gruppe of Jagdgeschwader 26 "Schlageter" (JG 26th—26th Fighter Wing).

== World War II ==
World War II in Europe began on Friday 1 September 1939 when German forces invaded Poland. At the time, Dahmer was assigned to 4. Staffel (4th squadron) of JG 26, a Staffel of II. Gruppe. On 16 May 1940 during the Battle of France, Dahmer claimed his first aerial victory. II. Gruppe engaged in aerial combat east Lille, claiming three aerial victories for the loss of one of their own. During this engagement, Dahmer claimed a Morane-Saulnier M.S.406 fighter shot down near Tournai. Since the Armée de l'air reported no losses in this area of operations, the opponents may have been Royal Air Force (RAF) Hawker Hurricane fighters from No. 615 Squadron who lost three Hurricanes and claimed one Bf 109 fighter shot down. On 28 May during the Battle of Dunkirk, Dahmer claimed a Supermarine Spitfire fighter shot down over the Thames Estuary. The following day in aerial combat with RAF Spitfire fighters from No. 64, No. 229 and No. 610 Squadron, Dahmer claimed one of the Spitfires shot down near Dover. On 7 June, Dahmer became a flying ace after he claimed two RAF Hurricane fighters from No. 43 Squadron shot down near Dieppe. These were also his last claims during the Battle of France.

In August 1940 during the Battle of Britain, Dahmer was transferred to 6. Staffel of JG 26. On 31 August, Dahmer claimed two aerial victories on two separate missions. JG 26 flew three combat air patrols to the northern banks of the Thames Estuary. Near Brentwood, Ebeling claimed a No. 56 Squadron Hurricane fighter shot down at 09:45. Later that day, he claimed a Spitfire fighter shot down near Gravesend. On 24 September, on a mission to London, Dahmer was credited with shooting down a Hurricane fighter near Southend. Six days later on 30 September, he claimed another Hurricane fighter destroyed. His opponent belonged to the No. 229 Squadron and was shot down near Tonbridge. On 1 February 1941, Dahmer was transferred to 1. Staffel of Jagdgeschwader 77 (JG 77—77th Fighter Wing) which was based in Norway. Dahmer was never given a reason for this transfer. He assumed that he may have offended one of the officers.

=== War on the Arctic Front ===
On 1 February 1941, a new I. Gruppe of JG 77 was created under the command of Hauptmann Walter Grommes. This unit was based at Stavanger-Sola and was tasked with providing fighter escort for German shipping on the southern and western Norwegian coast. Command of 1. Staffel of JG 77 was given to Oberleutnant Horst Carganico. On 4 June, 1. Staffel was detached from the Gruppe and relocated to Kirkenes Airfield in preparation of Operation Barbarossa, the German invasion of the Soviet Union. In northern Norway, 1. Staffel became part of IV. Gruppe of JG 77 which in September was referred to as Jagdgruppe z.b.V. Petsamo (zur besonderen Verwendung—for special deployment) and headed by Major Hennig Strümpell.

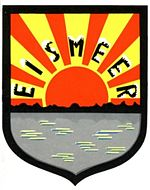
JG 5 Emblem

German forces launched Operation Barbarossa on 22 June 1941. On 25 June, the Staffel moved to Petsamo-Luostari as part of Operation Silver Fox. During the following weeks, Dahmer claimed further aerial victories, not all of which can be exactly dated. On 30 July, Dahmer was presented the Knight's Cross of the Iron Cross (Ritterkreuz des Eisernen Kreuzes), the first pilot to receive this distinction on the Eismeerfront (Ice Sea Front)—the area of operations nearest the Arctic Ocean. The presentation was made by Carganico, his commanding officer. (Note: According to Weal, Dahmer was awarded the Knight's Cross on 1 August 1941 for 22 confirmed aerial victories to date.) On 12 October, Dahmer led a formation which intercepted a flight of Tupolev SB-2 bombers from 137 BAP (Bombardirovochnyy Aviatsionyy Polk—bomber aviation regiment) over Lake Tolvand. During this encounter, Dahmer shot down three of the SB-2 bombers.

In January 1942, Jagdgeschwader 5 (JG 5—5th Fighter Wing) was newly created and placed under the command of Oberst Carl-Alfred Schumacher. On 3 January, I. Gruppe of JG 77 was renamed and became the I. Gruppe of JG 5. In consequence, 1. Staffel became the newly created 1. Staffel of JG 5. On 21 March, 1. Staffel was subordinated to II. Gruppe of JG 5, commanded by Strümpell, and became the 6. Staffel of JG 5.

=== On the Western Front ===
On 1 December 1942, Dahmer briefly returned to JG 26 before he was transferred to Jagdgeschwader 2 "Richthofen" (JG 2—2nd Fighter Wing). Dahmer was assigned to 7. Staffel of JG 2 under command of Oberleutnant Erich Hohagen. The Staffel was subordinated to III. Gruppe of JG 2 headed by Hauptmann Egon Mayer and was based at Vannes, France. On 23 January 1943, the United States Army Air Forces (USAAF) VIII Bomber Command attacked the U-boat base at Lorient. Defending against this attack, Dahmer claimed his first aerial victory with JG 2 when he shot down a Boeing B-17 Flying Fortress heavy bomber. On 6 March, the USAAF again attacked Lorient U-boat base and the port of Brest. That day, Dahmer claimed two B-17 bombers shot down.

On 17 August 1943, Dahmer was appointed Staffelkapitän (squadron leader) of 1. Staffel of JG 2. He replaced Oberleutnant Ferdinand Müller who had been killed in action the day before. The Staffel was subordinated to I. Gruppe of JG 2 under command of Hauptmann Hohagen. On 11 September, Dahmer was shot down in aerial combat with Spitfire and Republic P-47 Thunderbolt fighters. Although he managed to bail out of his Focke-Wulf Fw 190 A-5 (Werknummer 1171) 5 kilometers (3.1 miles) north of Rouen, Dahmer was severely injured. On 1 January 1944, command of 1. Staffel of JG 2 was officially transferred to Oberleutnant Siegfried Lemke. Due to his injuries, Dahmer never returned to combat operations, serving as an instructor. During the final weeks of the war, he worked on the R4M unguided air-to-air rocket.

== Later life ==
Following World War II, Dahmer joined the military service in the German Air Force, at the time referred to as the Bundesluftwaffe of the Bundeswehr, joining in 1956. Attaining the rank of Oberstleutnant (lieutenant colonel), he was a specialist for under-wing rockets. Dahmer died on 1 August 2006 at the age of 88 in Troisdorf, Germany.

== Summary of career ==
=== Aerial victory claims ===
According to US historian David T. Zabecki, Dahmer was credited with 57 aerial victories. Obermaier lists him with 45 aerial victories, plus further twelve unconfirmed claims, achieved in 307 combat missions. Mathews and Foreman, authors of Luftwaffe Aces — Biographies and Victory Claims, researched the German Federal Archives and state that he was credited with more than 40 aerial victory claims, plus two further unconfirmed claims. This figure includes 26 aerial victories on the Eastern Front and another 14 over the Western Allies, including three four-engined bombers.

Victory claims were logged to a map-reference (PQ = Planquadrat), for example "PQ 14 West 4967". The Luftwaffe grid map (Jägermeldenetz) covered all of Europe, western Russia and North Africa and was composed of rectangles measuring 15 minutes of latitude by 30 minutes of longitude, an area of about 360 square miles (930 km^{2}). These sectors were then subdivided into 36 smaller units to give a location area 3 km × 4 km (1.9 mi × 2.5 mi) in size.

Chronicle of aerial victories
Unconfirmed aerial victory claims for which Dahmer did not receive credit.; ? Information discrepancies listed by Caldwell, Prien, Stemmer, Rodeike, Bock, Mathews and Foreman.
Claim	Date	Time	Type	Location	Claim	Date	Time	Type	Location
– 4. Staffel of Jagdgeschwader 26 "Schlageter" – Battle of France — 10 May – 25 June 1940
1	16 May 1940	16:50? (Note: According to Caldwell claimed at 16:31.)	M.S.406	8 km (5.0 mi) northeast of Tournai	4	7 June 1940	19:35	Hurricane	south of Dieppe
2	28 May 1940	12:50	Spitfire	Thames Estuary	5	7 June 1940	19:40	Hurricane	south of Dieppe
3	29 May 1940	19:00	Spitfire	Dover					
– 6. Staffel of Jagdgeschwader 26 "Schlageter" – Action at the Channel and over England — 26 June 1940 – 31 January 1941
6	31 August 1940	09:45	Hurricane	Brentwood south of Gravesend	—	28 September 1940	—	Spitfire	Canterbury
7	31 August 1940	19:45	Spitfire	Gravesend	9	30 September 1940	10:25	Hurricane	Tonbridge
8	24 September 1940	10:55	Hurricane	Southend	—	15 October 1940	—	Spitfire	east of London
– 1. Staffel of Jagdgeschwader 77 – Eastern and northern Norway — 22 June – 5 December 1941
According to Prien, Stemmer, Rodeike and Bock, Dahmer claimed his 10th to 36th aerial victories in the timeframe 22 June to 5 December 1941, one of which can't be dated.
10	26 June 1941	—	unknown		24	22 August 1941	—	unknown	
11	28 June 1941	—	unknown		25	23 August 1941	—	unknown	
12	28 June 1941	—	unknown		26	26 August 1941	—	I-153	Titovka
13	29 June 1941	—	unknown		27	26 August 1941	—	I-153	Titovka
14	29 June 1941	—	unknown		28	26 August 1941	—	I-153	Titovka
15	29 June 1941	—	unknown		29	31 August 1941	—	fighter aircraft	Warlamowo
16	2 July 1941	—	unknown		30	12 September 1941	—	I-16	
17	7 July 1941	—	fighter aircraft	vicinity of Shonguy	31	17 September 1941	—	I-153	Zapadnaya Litsa
18	8 July 1941	—	fighter aircraft	over the Zapadnaya Litsa bight	32	19 September 1941	—	I-153	Alakurtti
19	9 July 1941	—	SB-2	Murmansk	33	28 September 1941	—	fighter aircraft	
20	11 July 1941	—	unknown		34	12 October 1941	—	SB-2	Alakurtti
21	24 July 1941	—	I-16		35	12 October 1941	—	SB-2	Alakurtti
	30 July 1941	—	unknown		36	12 October 1941	—	SB-2	Alakurtti
– 1. Staffel of Jagdgeschwader 5 – Eastern Front and northern Norway, and Finland — 6 December 1941 – February 1942
37	21 February 1942	11:15	Hurricane		38	22 February 1942	12:10	LaGG-3	Titovka
– 7. Staffel of Jagdgeschwader 2 "Richthofen" – On the Western Front — 1 January – 16 August 1943
39? (Note: This claim is not listed by Mathews and Foreman.)	23 January 1943	14:08	B-17	PQ 14 West 4967	42	8 March 1943	14:15	B-17	PQ 15 West 3055
40	6 March 1943	14:40	B-17	northwest of Lorient	43?	16 August 1943	10:30	P-47	PQ 05 Ost 2075
41?	6 March 1943	15:05	B-17	PQ 14 West 6825					
– 1. Staffel of Jagdgeschwader 2 "Richthofen" – On the Western Front — 17 August – 11 September 1943
44	22 August 1943	19:55	Spitfire	PQ 05 Ost SA-6/6, southwest of Bolbec	45	6 September 1943	12:20	B-17	Villeneuve

=== Awards ===
- Iron Cross (1939) 2nd and 1st Class
- Knight's Cross of the Iron Cross on 1 August 1941 as Oberfeldwebel and pilot in the 6./Jagdgeschwader 5 (Note: According to Scherzer on 30 July 1941 as pilot in the I./Jagdgeschwader 77.)
