= Worfelden =

- Ortsteil of Büttelborn
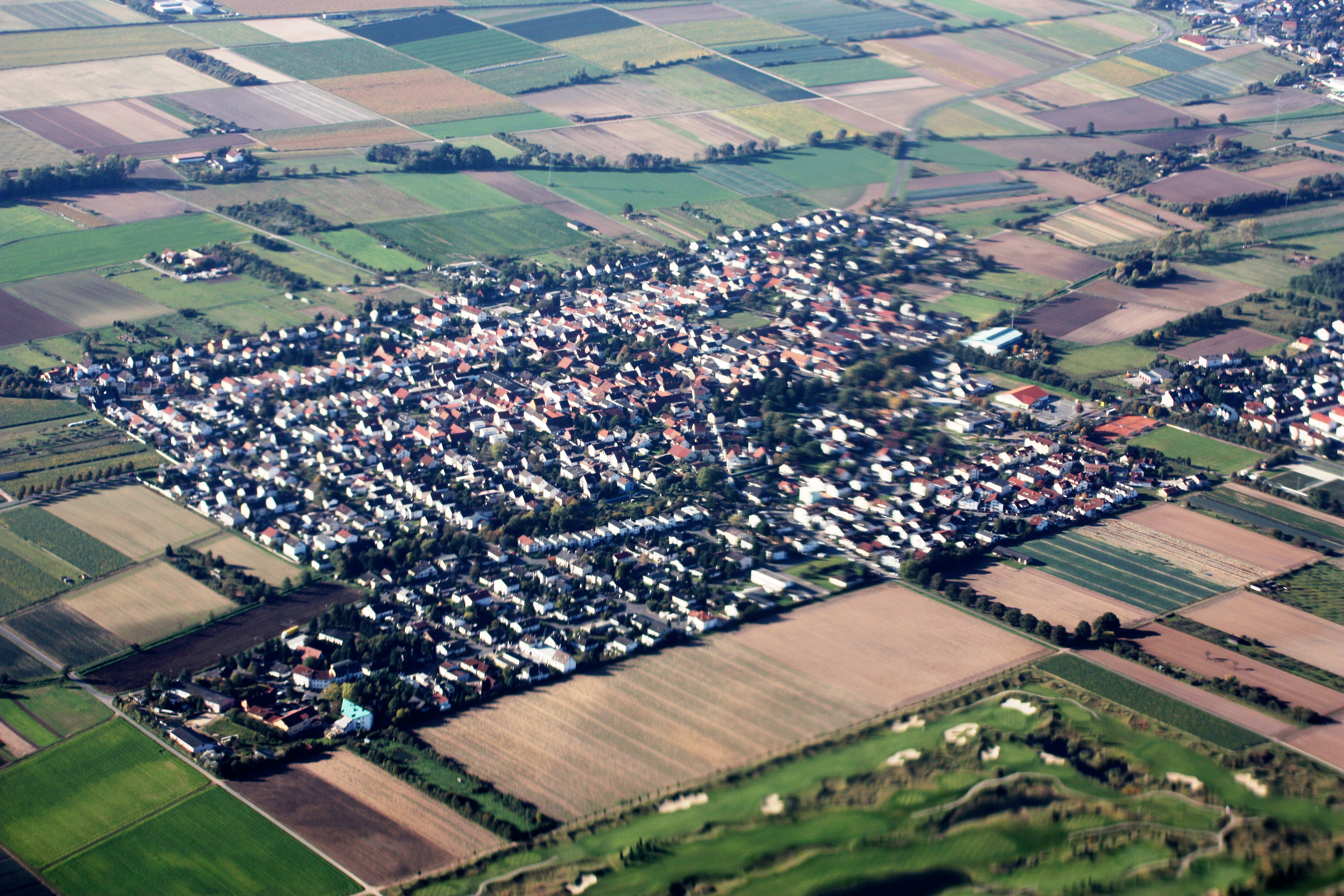
- Aerial photograph of Worfelden (2010)

- Coat of arms
- Interactive map of Worfelden
- Location within Germany Location within Hesse
- Coordinates: 49°55′44″N 08°32′55″E
- Country: Germany
- State: Hesse
- District: Groß-Gerau
- Municipality: Büttelborn

Area
  - Total: 9.6 km^{2} (3.7 sq mi)
- Elevation: 96 m (315 ft)

Population (2011-12-31)
  - Total: 4,536
  - Density: 470/km^{2} (1,200/sq mi)
- Time zone: UTC+01:00 (CET)
  - Summer (DST): UTC+02:00 (CEST)
- Postal codes: 64572
- Dialling codes: 06152

Worfelden is a village in the municipality of Büttelborn, which is located in the triangle formed by the cities of Frankfurt, Mainz and Darmstadt, within the Rhine-Main region.

== Geography ==
=== Location ===
The parish of Worfeld lies entirely within the so-called Hegbach-Apfelbach Bottom (Hegbach-Apfelbach-Grund) in the western Lower Main Plain. In this respect it differs from Lage Büttelborn, whose southwestern corner lies within the Hessian Ried.

In the north Worfelden borders on Mörfelden, in the east on Schneppenhausen (Darmstadt-Dieburg), in the southeast on Braunshardt (Darmstadt-Dieburg), in the southwest on Büttelborn and in the west on Klein-Gerau.

== Literature ==
- Emil Hieke: Die Geschichte Worfeldens. Published by the municipal council (Gemeindeverwaltung), 1959
- Otto Klausing: Die naturräumlichen Einheiten auf Blatt 151 Darmstadt. Bad Godesberg, 1967
- Festschrift 750 Jahre Worfelden, 1975
- There is literature about Worfelden in the Hessian Bibliography
