= Darmbach =

River in Germany

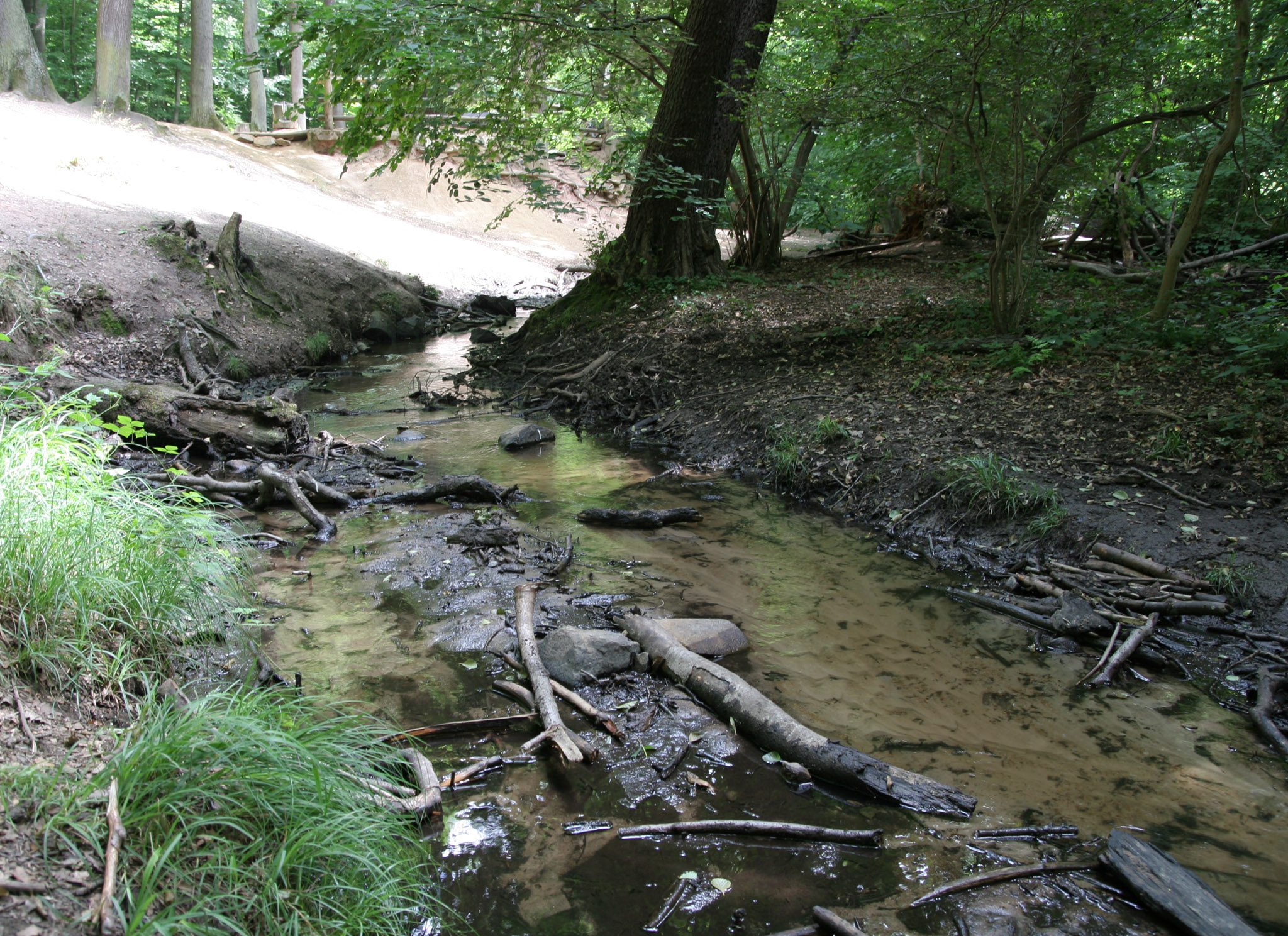

Location
- Country: Germany
- State: Hesse

Physical characteristics
- Mouth
  - location: Schwarzbach
  - coordinates: 49.9226°N 8.3961°E
- Length: 29.1 km (18.1 mi)

Basin features
- Progression: Schwarzbach→ Rhine→ North Sea

The Darmbach (in its middle course: Landwehr, in its lower course: Landgraben) is a river of Hesse, Germany. It flows through Darmstadt, and into the Schwarzbach in Trebur.

== See also ==
- List of rivers of Hesse
