= Büttelborn =

- Municipality
- Coat of arms

- Location of Büttelborn within Groß-Gerau district
- Interactive map of Büttelborn
- Location within Germany Location within Hesse
- Coordinates: 49°54′N 08°31′E
- Country: Germany
- State: Hesse
- Admin. region: Darmstadt
- District: Groß-Gerau

Government
  - Mayor (2018–24): Marcus Merkel (SPD)

Area
  - Total: 30.01 km^{2} (11.59 sq mi)
- Elevation: 91 m (299 ft)

Population (2025-12-31)
  - Total: 14,712
  - Density: 490.2/km^{2} (1,270/sq mi)
- Time zone: UTC+01:00 (CET)
  - Summer (DST): UTC+02:00 (CEST)
- Postal codes: 64572
- Dialling codes: 06152
- Vehicle registration: GG
- Website: www.buettelborn.de

Büttelborn is a municipality in Groß-Gerau district in Hesse, Germany.

== Geography ==
=== Location ===
Büttelborn lies on the edge of the northern Hessisches Ried, the northeastern section of the Rhine rift, and even today is still partly rural. Its proximity to the Frankfurt Rhein-Main Region makes Büttelborn an attractive suburban community, lying 12 km from Darmstadt, 25 km from Mainz and 30 km from Frankfurt am Main.

=== Neighbouring communities ===
Büttelborn borders in the north on the town of Mörfelden-Walldorf, in the east on the town of Weiterstadt, in the south on the town of Griesheim (both in Darmstadt-Dieburg), and in the west and northwest on the town of Groß-Gerau.

=== Constituent communities ===
Since municipal reforms in 1977, the community has had three centres named Büttelborn (5,266 inhabitants), Klein-Gerau (3,803 inhabitants) and Worfelden (4,345 inhabitants).

== History ==
=== Büttelborn ===
Büttelborn's first documentary mention came in 1222 under the name Butelbrunne. In 1257, Büttelborn passed to the Counts of Katzenelnbogen. Once the Katzenelnbogen male line had died out, Büttelborn passed to Hesse in 1479, of which it is still part today. In the Middle Ages, there was in Büttelborn one of the 30 woods of the Dreieich Royal Hunting Grounds.

=== Klein-Gerau ===
Klein-Gerau's first documentary mention came in 1246. It was part of the Mark Gerau ("Gerau March") and was a fief of the Lords of Dornberg. The inhabitants were, however, largely independent of their overlords. Foremost among their activities were grain farming and cattle raising and the woods north of the Mühlbach served as grazing lands. The two mills, of which the Eichmühle ("Oak Mill") still stands today, were already being mentioned in documents in 1303.

The time when the Middle Ages were coming to an end and the modern age was dawning was not altogether peaceful, with the village being drawn into the dispute between Katzenelnbogen and Mainz in 1342, leading to its being pillaged.

According to the register of the damages, Klein-Gerau suffered heavy destruction. In 1395, a similar thing once again happened at the Hanauers' hands. At this time, the greater part of the population was under serfdom, as documentation shows. The village lay between two yards, the older one near where the town hall now is, and the newer one at what is now the intersection of Bahnhofstrasse and Hauptstrasse, where there was also a small graveyard and St. Wendelin's Chapel. This chapel was destroyed in the Schmalkaldic War, as was the whole village, by General von Bueren's people.

The village's character had not changed up until the Thirty Years' War. Klein-Gerau had 150 inhabitants when in 1622 Field Marshal Peter Ernst II von Mansfeld marauded for a while over the Gerauer Land. Then came the Swedes under Gustav II Adolf and with them the Plague. It took more than 50 years for the village to recover from the war's ravages.

As of 1700, the population growth led to clearing north of the Mühlbach that was only brought to an end for good on the 20th century. In 1729 the Town Hall was built and in 1753 a new schoolhouse, which is nowadays the Evangelical church.

The population was now rising steadily and briskly. In 1779, Klein-Gerau had 323 inhabitants. By 1825, that had risen to 459, and by 1900 to 723, reaching "exactly 1,075" by the time the Second World War broke out in 1939.

The building of the railway between Darmstadt and Mainz about 1858 improved the strained situation in the village considerably, affording access to jobs in surrounding towns, and raising many groups' incomes by improving distribution of harvested crops to the markets in neighbouring towns. Moderately prosperous – for a full century from 1850 to 1950 – were the orchards established by the teacher Berz who lived in the village. Even asparagus farming in the local area began in Klein-Gerau. All this meant that the village and its people were spared the worst troubles at the time of the Industrial Revolution.

On the night of 17 and 18 April 1932, a fire broke out at the Town Hall, destroying the whole attic, parts of the upper floor and the clock works in the bell tower, together with the bell. Nevertheless, the Town Hall was built anew that same year and placed under protection as a monument.

In the second half of the 20th century, the heretofore secondary industry of agriculture was coming ever more towards the fore, with this restructuring bringing Klein-Gerau to prominence as a rural residential community.

In 1977, previously independent community of Klein-Gerau was amalgamated as one of three constituent communities of Büttelborn. In the summer of 1996, Klein-Gerau celebrated its 750th anniversary of first documentary mention with, among other things, a great street festival around the renovated historic Town Hall.

For years, Klein-Gerau has been known countrywide as the "Bauchnabel Südhessens" – "South Hesse's Navel".

The name Klein-Gerau means "Small Gerau", and the village shares its name with the independent town of Groß-Gerau – "Great Gerau".

=== Worfelden ===
Worfelden's first documentary mention came in 1225, under the name Woruelde, when a Heinrich von Worfelden was named as a witness to the division of a plot of land. The document also renders the name Worfelden and Woruelden. Other spellings that have cropped up over the course of the years are Urfelt, Würfelt, Worveldin and Wohrfelden.

In 1319, the village was referred to as villa urfelt.

The likeliest explanation of the name's meaning comes from the Hessian Ortsnamensbuch ("Placename Book"), namely from ur (for "moist" or "moist field") and wara (for "care" or "protection").

Worfelden nobles are also to be found in the history books, such as Heinrich von Worfelden, a guarantor for Count Eberhard von Katzenelnbogen in 1297 or Clas Ernst von Worfelden, Sänger zu Oppenheim, Angrenzer in Erfelden ("Singer at Oppenheim, Neighbouring Landowner in Erfelden").

In the Middle Ages, there was in Worfelden one of the 30 woods of the Dreieich Royal Hunting Grounds.

The people of Worfelden at first paid their taxes to the Landgraves of Dornberg, later the Counts of Katzenelnbogen (until 1479), and thereafter to the Landgrave of Darmstadt. In 1791, the village had 2002 Morgens of mostly sandy fields and 157 Morgens of meadows, and neither forest nor grazing land. The woods had been sold about 1670 to Klein-Gerau, then a separate village.

In 1912, Worfelden was connected to the electrical grid. At the 1929 church festival, water was first drawn from the supply network. The village's former agricultural character was lost after the Second World War, as it was throughout the area. Many people from Worfelden found their livelihoods at Opel in Rüsselsheim. In mid 1975, Worfelden's 750th anniversary of first documentary mention was celebrated, before the village had to give up its independence only one and a half years later.

== Schools ==
- Pestalozzischule in Büttelborn
- Erich-Kästner-Schule in Klein-Gerau
- Grundschule Worfelden in Worfelden (primary school)

== Transport ==
Büttelborn is connected to Autobahn A67 and Federal Highway (Bundesstraße) B42. There is also a railway connection on the Aschaffenburg – Mainz line with a station in Klein-Gerau.

== Events ==
- Kerb (Kermesse)
- Fastnacht (carnival)
- Weihnachtsmarkt (Christmas Market)
