= Groß-Gerau =

- Town
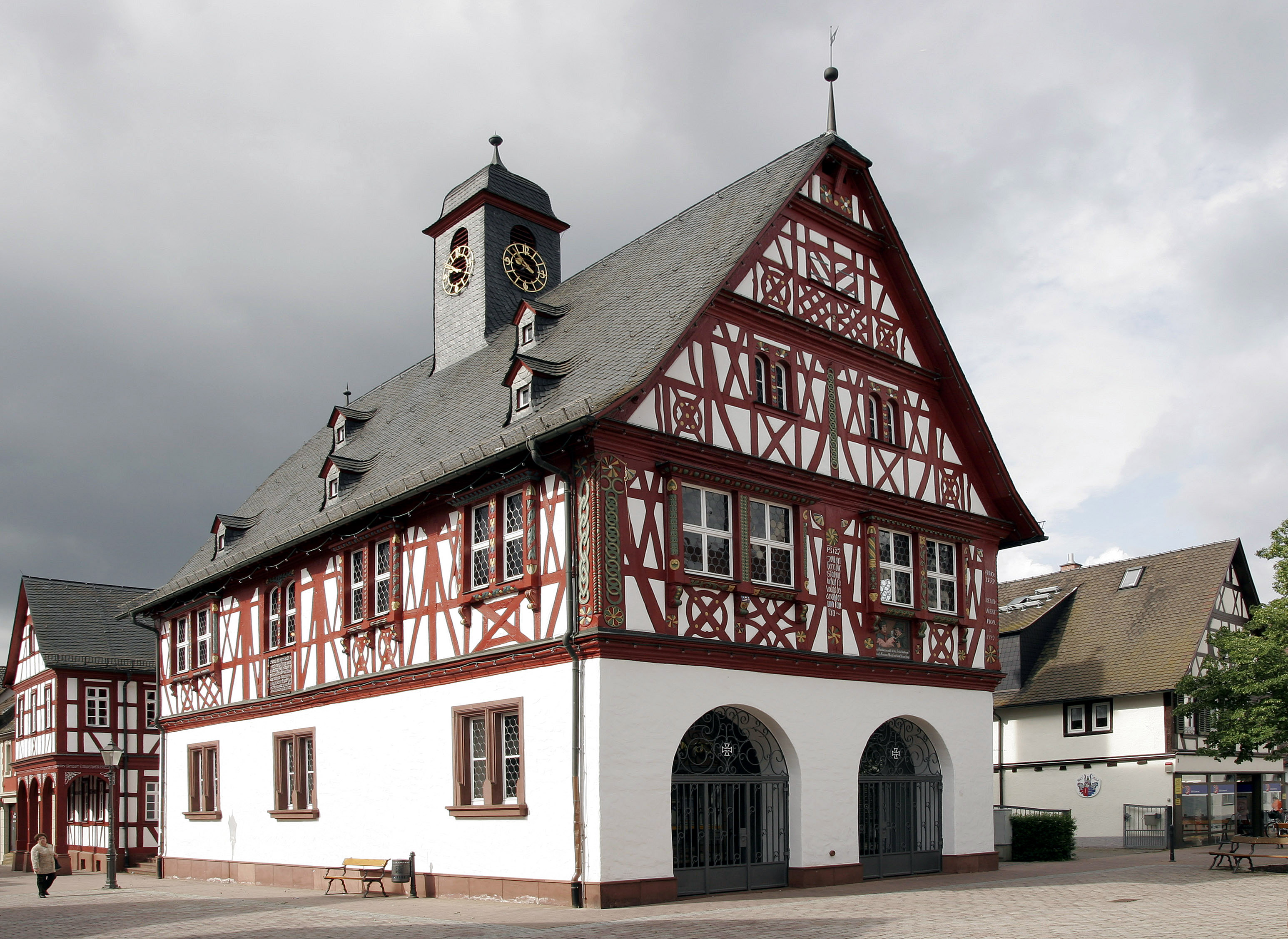
- Old Town Hall

- Coat of arms

- Location of Groß-Gerau within Groß-Gerau district
- Interactive map of Groß-Gerau
- Location within Germany Location within Hesse
- Coordinates: 49°55′09″N 08°29′06″E
- Country: Germany
- State: Hesse
- Admin. region: Darmstadt
- District: Groß-Gerau

Government
  - Mayor (2024–30): Jörg Rüddenklau (SPD)

Area
  - Total: 54.47 km^{2} (21.03 sq mi)
- Elevation: 88 m (289 ft)

Population (2025-12-31)
  - Total: 25,401
  - Density: 466.3/km^{2} (1,208/sq mi)
- Time zone: UTC+01:00 (CET)
  - Summer (DST): UTC+02:00 (CEST)
- Postal codes: 64501–64521
- Dialling codes: 06152
- Vehicle registration: GG
- Website: www.gross-gerau.de

Groß-Gerau (German: [ɡʁoːsˈɡeːʁaʊ]) is the district seat of the Groß-Gerau district, lying in the southern Frankfurt Rhein-Main Region in Hesse, Germany, and serving as a hub for the surrounding area. In 1994, the town hosted the 34th Hessentag state festival.

== Geography ==
=== Location ===
Groß-Gerau lies in the north of the Hessisches Ried, the northeastern section of the Rhine rift.

=== Neighbouring communities ===
Groß-Gerau borders in the north on the community of Nauheim, in the northeast on the town of Mörfelden-Walldorf, in the east on the community of Büttelborn, in the southeast on the town of Griesheim (Darmstadt-Dieburg), in the south on the community of Riedstadt and in the west on the community of Trebur.

=== Constituent communities ===
Groß-Gerau consists of the centres of Berkach, Dornberg, Dornheim, Auf Esch, Groß-Gerau and Wallerstädten.

== History ==
Already by Roman times, the area forming today's town of Groß-Gerau had great importance. A fort in the area of the constituent community of Auf Esch ensured a bridgehead for the Roman provincial capital of Moguntiacum (Mainz), even before the Limes was established and southern Hesse became Roman. Federal Highway (Bundesstraße) B44 from the southern tip of the old pheasantry (at Auf Esch) to Dornheim corresponds exactly with the old Roman road from Mainz through Groß-Gerau to Ladenburg. It led to the fort's south gate. With the founding of the Civitas Auderiensium (Dieburg), the fort was forsaken. The camp (vicus) remained and became a market village. The fact that this vicus and the later mentioned Wasserburg Dornberg (moat-ringed castle) corresponded very closely in location would be no accident.

The Gerauer Mark (Gerau March, the woods between Wallerstädten and Messel) had its first documentary mention in one of Mainz Archbishop Hatto I's donation documents in 910. In the time that followed, the Lords of Dornberg, held sway in the region, likely doing so as the Hohenstaufen emperors' vassals in the Frankfurt Palatinate (in 1160, a moat-ringed castle is mentioned in what is now the Dornberg area). After the Lords of Dornberg died out came the Counts of Katzenelnbogen as their successors. The new overlords managed to procure town rights for Groß-Gerau in 1398. In 1479, Count Philip the Elder died without a male heir and the county passed to Hesse. In 1578, building work on the Town Hall was begun. This was where the Schöffengericht ("Jurymen's Court") and the Schultheißen (roughly "sheriffs") appointed by the Landgraves sat. Groß-Gerau's town church was burnt down in 1634 by Imperial troops during the Thirty Years' War. Landgrave Ludwig VI of Hesse-Darmstadt renewed Groß-Gerau's town rights in 1663 for a payment of 24000 Gulden. These rights included the abolition of compulsory labour, market stall levies, representation in the Landtag and the right to drive Jews out of the town.

In the 19th century, industrialization began in Groß-Gerau, too, as elsewhere. Given the connection to the Hessische Ludwigsbahn (railway) with the Darmstadt-Mainz stretch in 1858 and the Frankfurt am Main-Mannheim stretch in 1879 (the Riedbahn), a multifaceted industrial life sprang up. The town became headquarters to metalworking businesses (FAGRO), canneries (Helvetia), cheesemakers (Groß-Gerau is where "Mainz" cheese is made) and the sugar industry. From 1869 to 1871, Groß-Gerau was the epicentre of a series of mostly weak earthquakes. A plan to connect two local railway stations and the surrounding communities together with a tramway in the late 19th century fell through, and there are still no trams in the town even now.

Recently, the town's, and more particularly the district's economic situation has worsened. Relatively high debt loads and strict controls of public institutions (especially at the district level) by the government presidium in Darmstadt have led to this.

The name Groß-Gerau means "Great Gerau", and the town shares its name with the village of Klein-Gerau – "Small Gerau" – a constituent community of Büttelborn.

=== Population development ===
(Each time as at 31 December)

- 1998 - 23,000
- 1999 - 23,147
- 2000 - 23,349
- 2001 - 23,342
- 2002 - 23,565
- 2003 - 23,600
- 2004 - 23,519
- 2017 - 25,496

== Politics ==
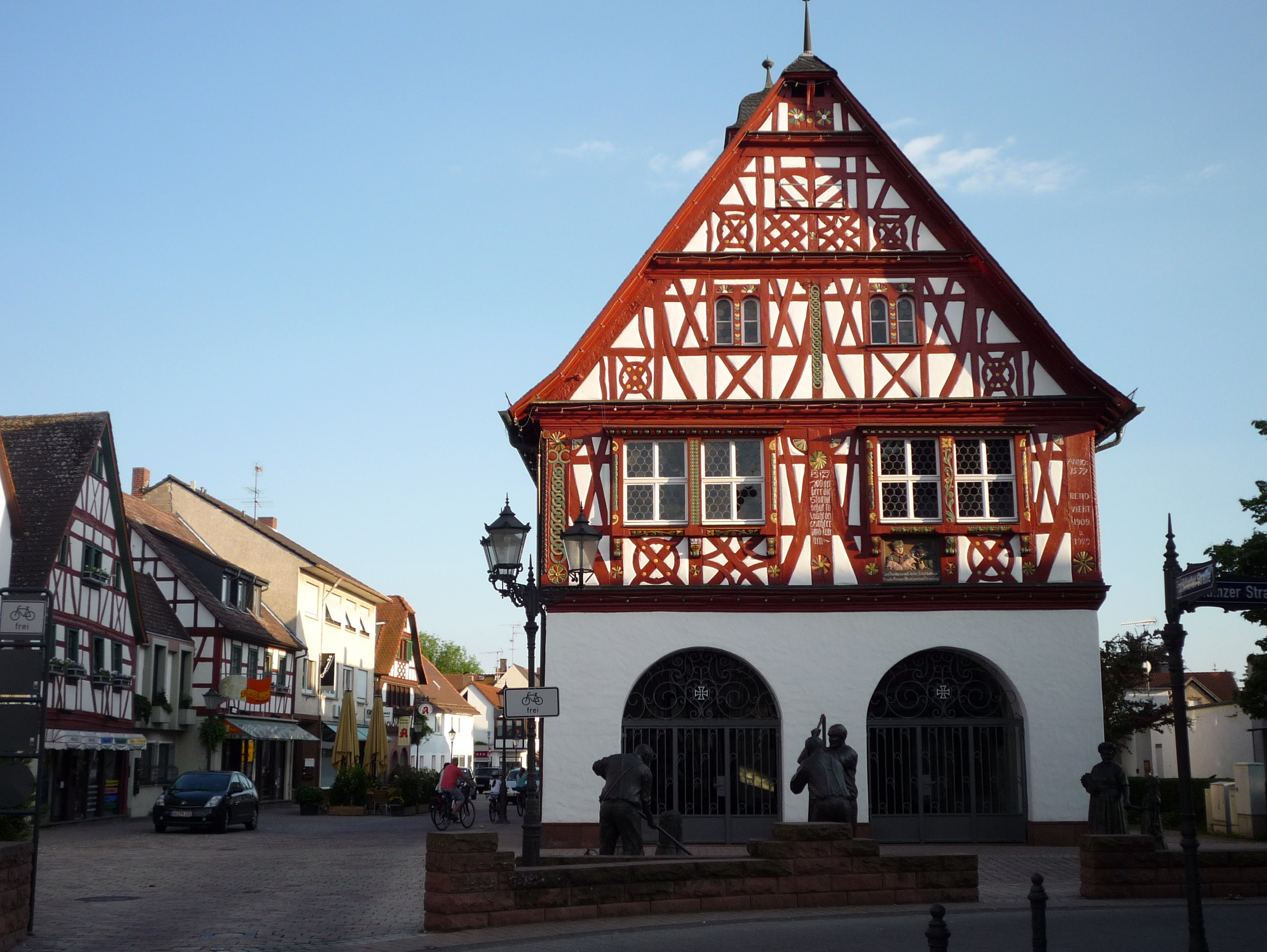
Old Town Hall

=== Town council ===
Groß-Gerau's council is made up of 33 councillors, with seats apportioned thus, in accordance with municipal elections held on 6 March 2016: (in parentheses changes from municipal elections held in March 2011):

- SPD 10 seats (-1)
- CDU 10 seats (-1)
- Greens 4 seats (-3)
- KOMBI 3 seats (-)
- Left Party 2 seats (+1)
- Free Democratic Party 2 seats (+2)
- Free Voters 2 seats (+2)

Note: KOMBI is a citizens' coalition.

=== Executive and mayor ===
The executive of the district town of Groß-Gerau consists of the directly elected mayor, the honorary first town councillor, a full-time town councillor and a further five honorary town councillors.

The current mayor Erhard Walther of the CDU was elected on 4 February 2018.

=== Coat of arms ===
Groß-Gerau's civic coat of arms might heraldically be described thus: The shield: Party per fess, above, a lion rampant striped per fess three times argent three times gules, armed, langued and crowned Or (or langued gules, depending on source), below, in Or a cross pattée gules and between the arms above dexter an onion with shoots vert, sinister a cabbage vert, below dexter a cabbage vert, sinister an onion with shoots vert, both onions per bend sinister. The crest: a crenellated wall with three crenellated towers Or.

Groß-Gerau's oldest known town seal dates from the 16th century. There are none surviving from the time when town rights were first granted in 1398. The seal in question shows a cabbage and an onion, perhaps symbolizing horticulture's importance in the area. The cross first appeared about 1600 in combination with the vegetables, and this new symbol was used in town seals and on buildings. It is unknown why the cross came to be in the town's seal. It is also seen on a municipal limit marker from 1596, but without the produce. The arms were granted in 1901, and also include the lion of Hesse in the chief.

The arms shown in this article and on the town's official website include the crest consisting of a crenellated castle wall with three crenellated towers. This crest does not appear in some earlier versions.

== Economy and infrastructure ==
=== Transport ===
Groß-Gerau is very advantageously placed for transportation. It is on Federal Highways (Bundesstraßen) B42/L3482 and B44. Groß Gerau-Dornberg station is on the Mannheim–Frankfurt railway and Groß Gerau station is on the Wiesbaden–Darmstadt–Aschaffenburg line. The north and south Autobahn interchanges on the A 67 provide connections in all directions. Frankfurt International Airport is 15 minutes away by Autobahn. Even major cities are right nearby (Darmstadt 11 km, Wiesbaden 23 km, Mainz 18 km and Frankfurt am Main 28 km).

=== Established businesses ===
- FAGRO Preß- und Stanzwerk GmbH (closed down)
- Procter & Gamble, Werk Groß-Gerau (formerly Wick; personal hygiene and pharmaceuticals)
- Südzucker AG, Werk Groß-Gerau (closed down)
- Frigoropa GmbH (EK19), daughter company of Nordfrost AG (deepfreezes)
- Erlenbacher Backwaren GmbH], daughter company of Nestlé AG
- Engel & Völkers, Claus Jousten Immobilien e.K. Franchise of Engel & Völkers Residential GmbH

=== Media ===
The only daily newspaper is the Groß-Gerauer Echo, belonging to the Darmstädter Echo newspaper family.

=== Schools ===
- Luise-Büchner-Schule
- Schwenkschule (former: Johannes-Angelus-Schule)
- Grundschule Dornheim
- Schillerschule
- Nordschule
- Berufliche Schulen Groß-Gerau
- Grundschule Wallerstädten
- Martin-Buber-Schule
- Prälat-Diehl-Schule
- Goetheschule
- Astrid-Lindgren-Schule
- Liberta Schule
- Carl von Ossietzky Schule

== Twin towns – sister cities ==
Groß-Gerau is twinned with:

- Brignoles, France (1959)
- Bruneck, Italy (1959)
- Tielt, Belgium (1959)
- Szamotuły, Poland (2000)

== Notable people ==
- Max Ilgner (1899–1966), industrialist
- Fabio De Masi (born 1980), German-Italian politician
- Ludwig Roth (1909–1967), aerospace engineer
- Tobias Reinhardt (born 1971), classical scholar
- Laura Sánchez (born 1981), Spanish model and actress
- Indira Weis (born 1979), actress and singer

== Gallery ==
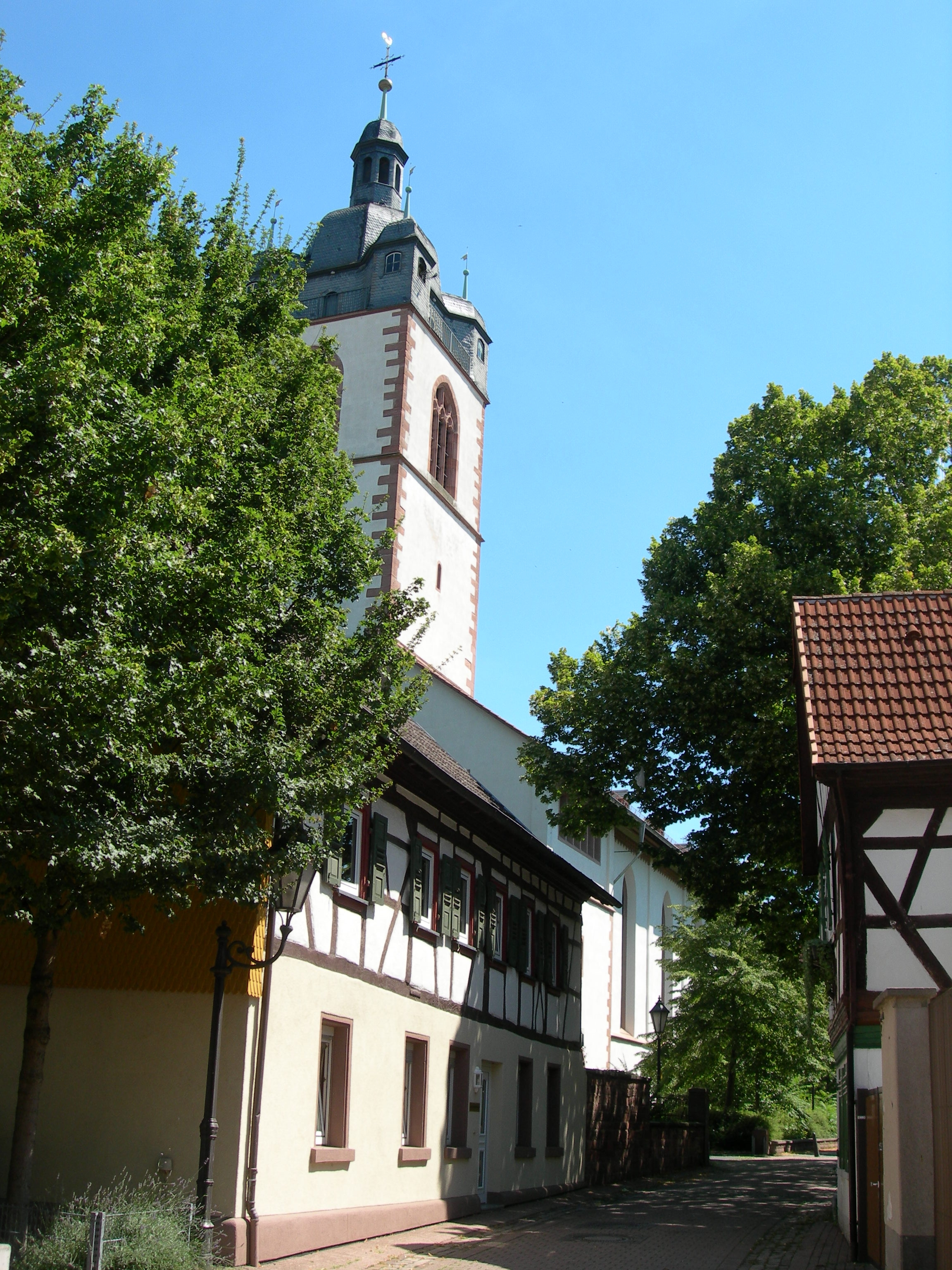
Town Church (Evangelical)

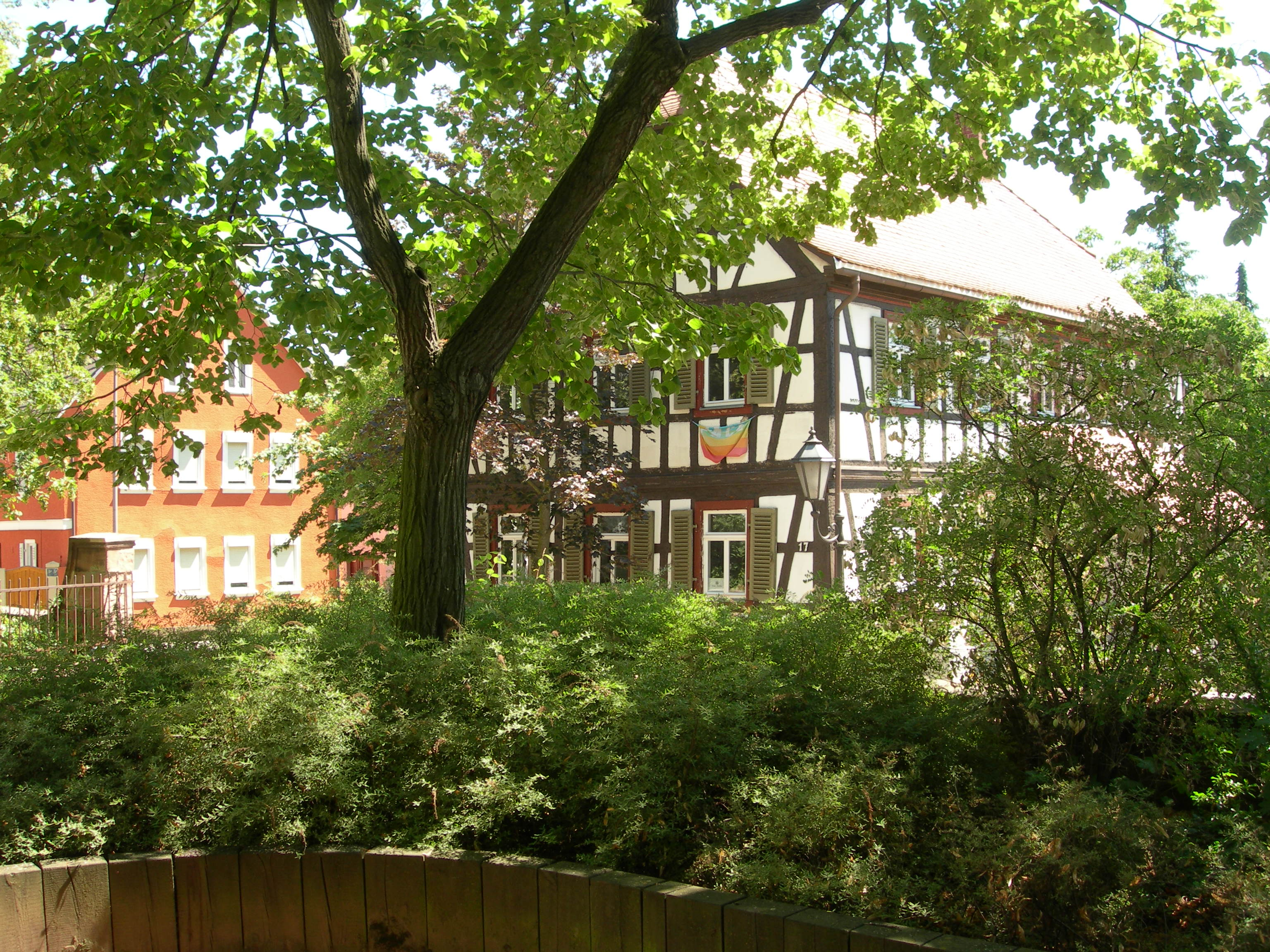
Half-timbered house at the Town Church

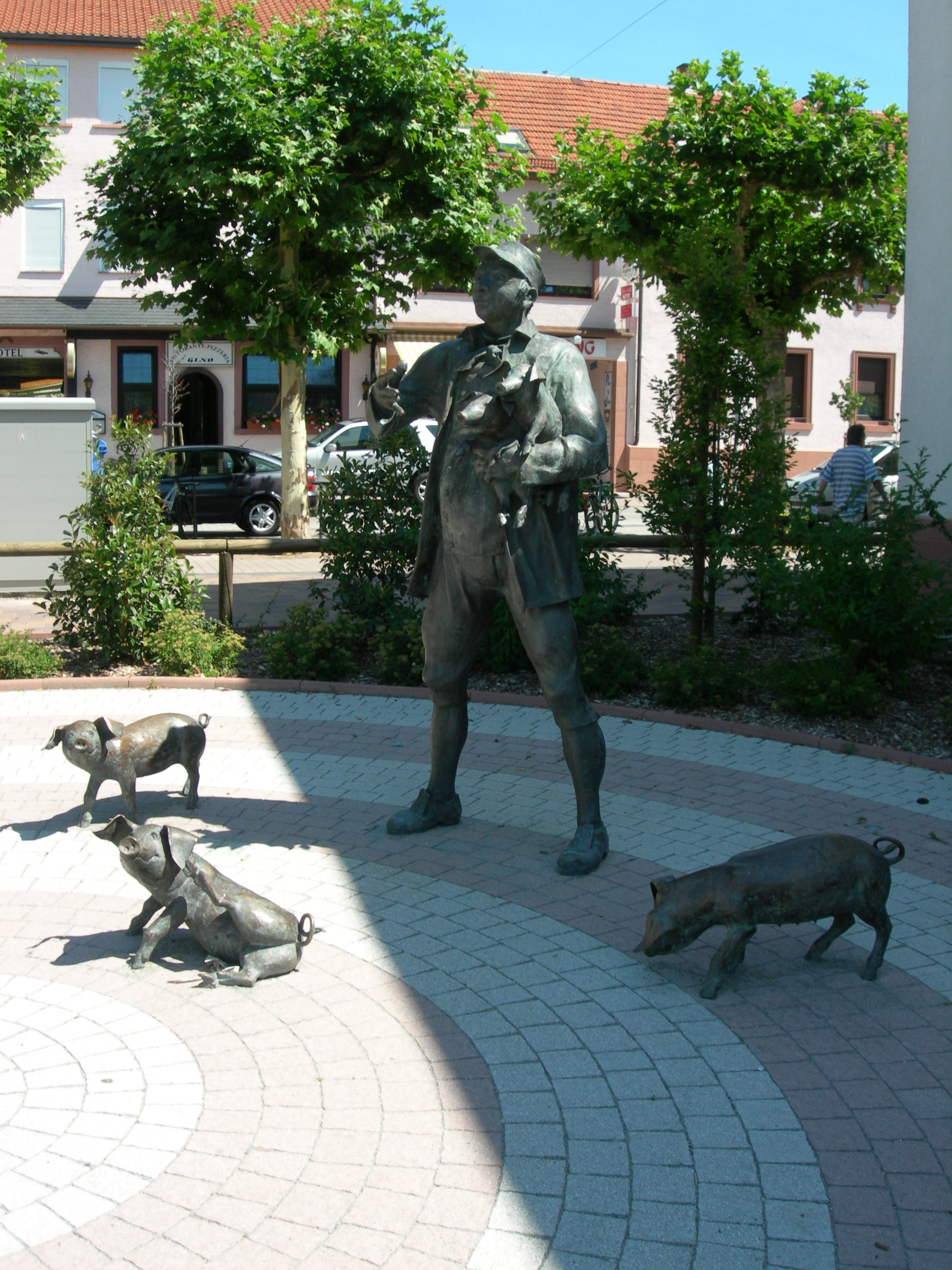
Sculpture at the marketplace (house of the VHS)

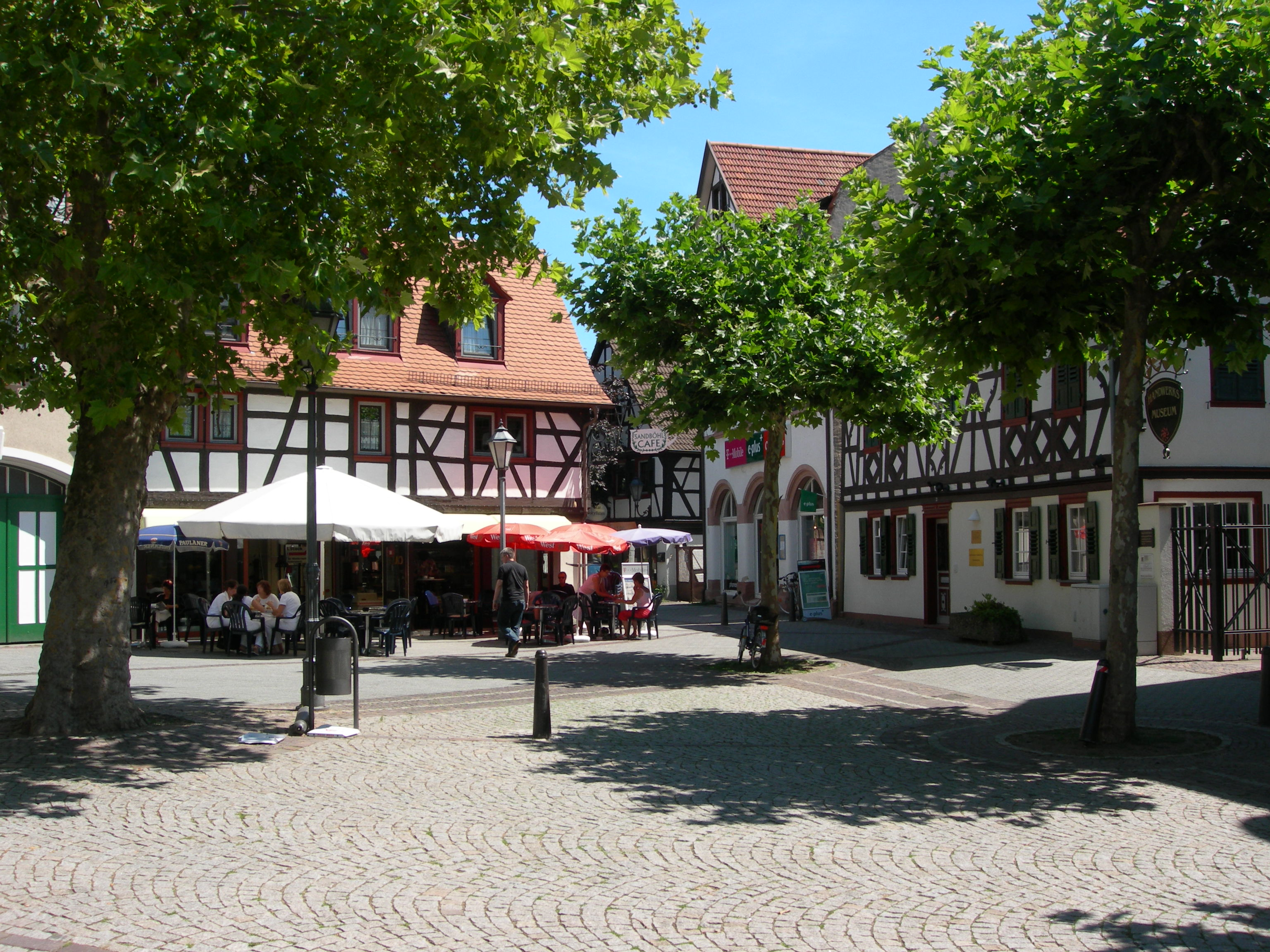
Historic houses

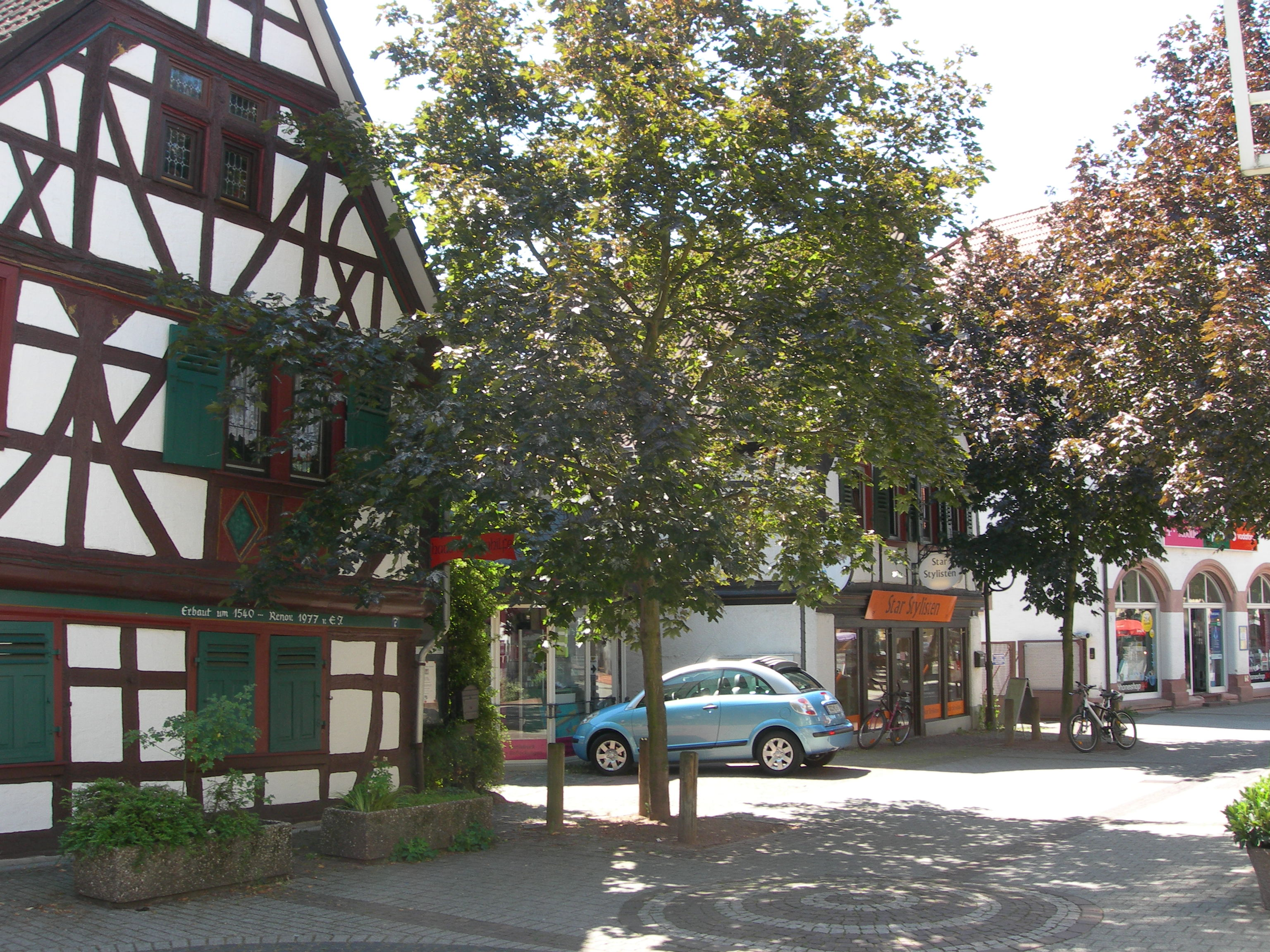
Historic houses

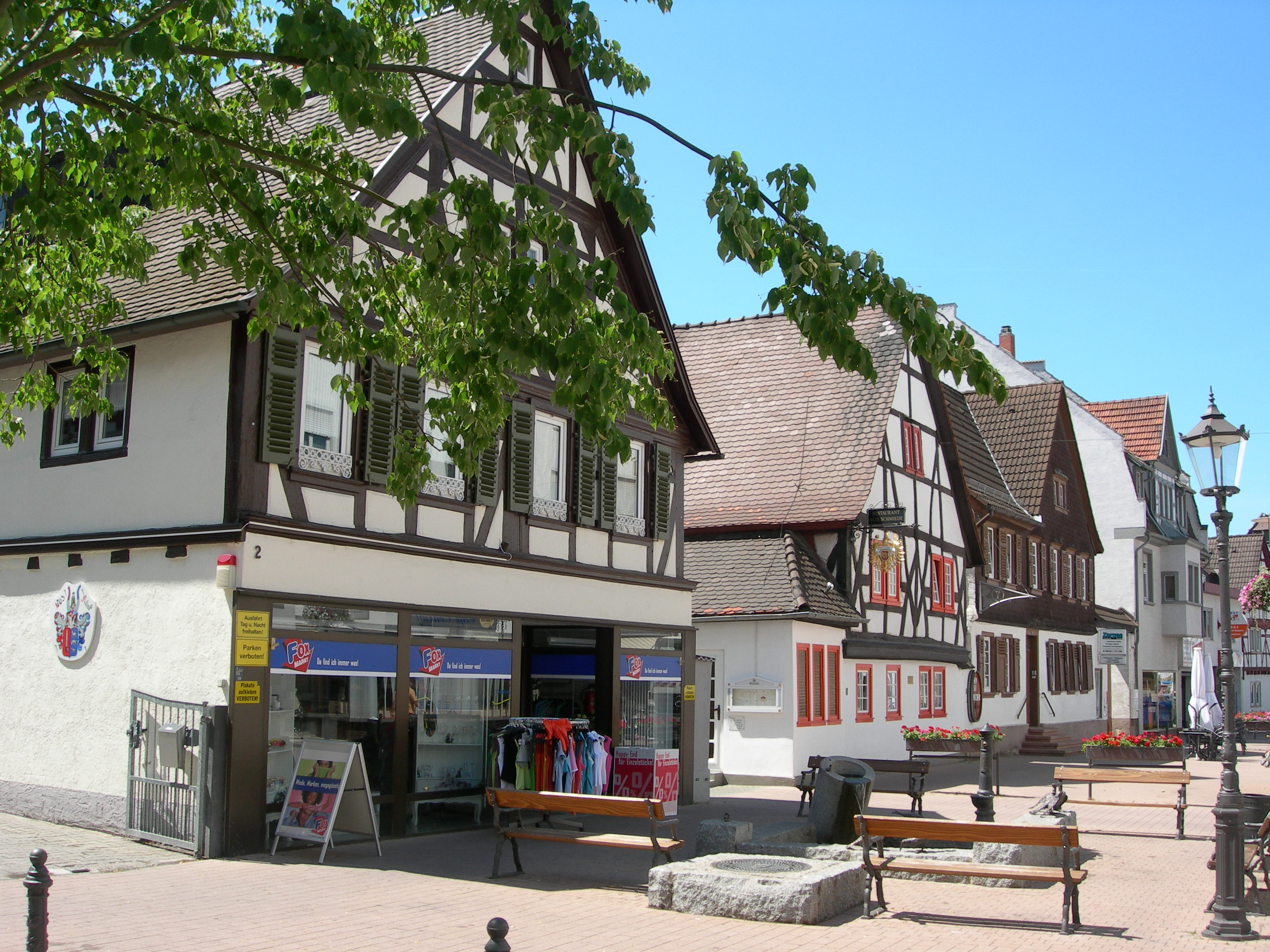
Historic houses

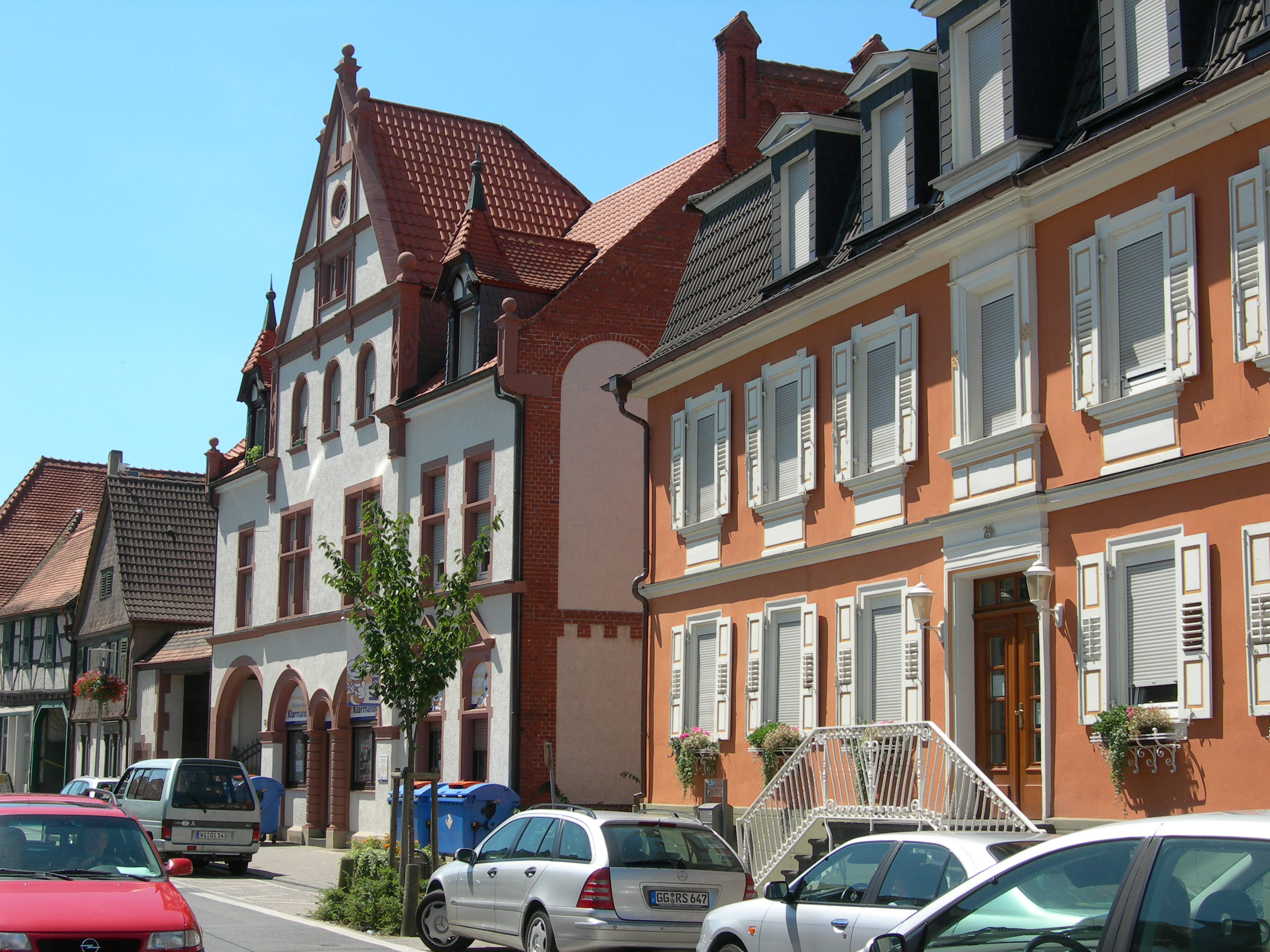
Historic houses

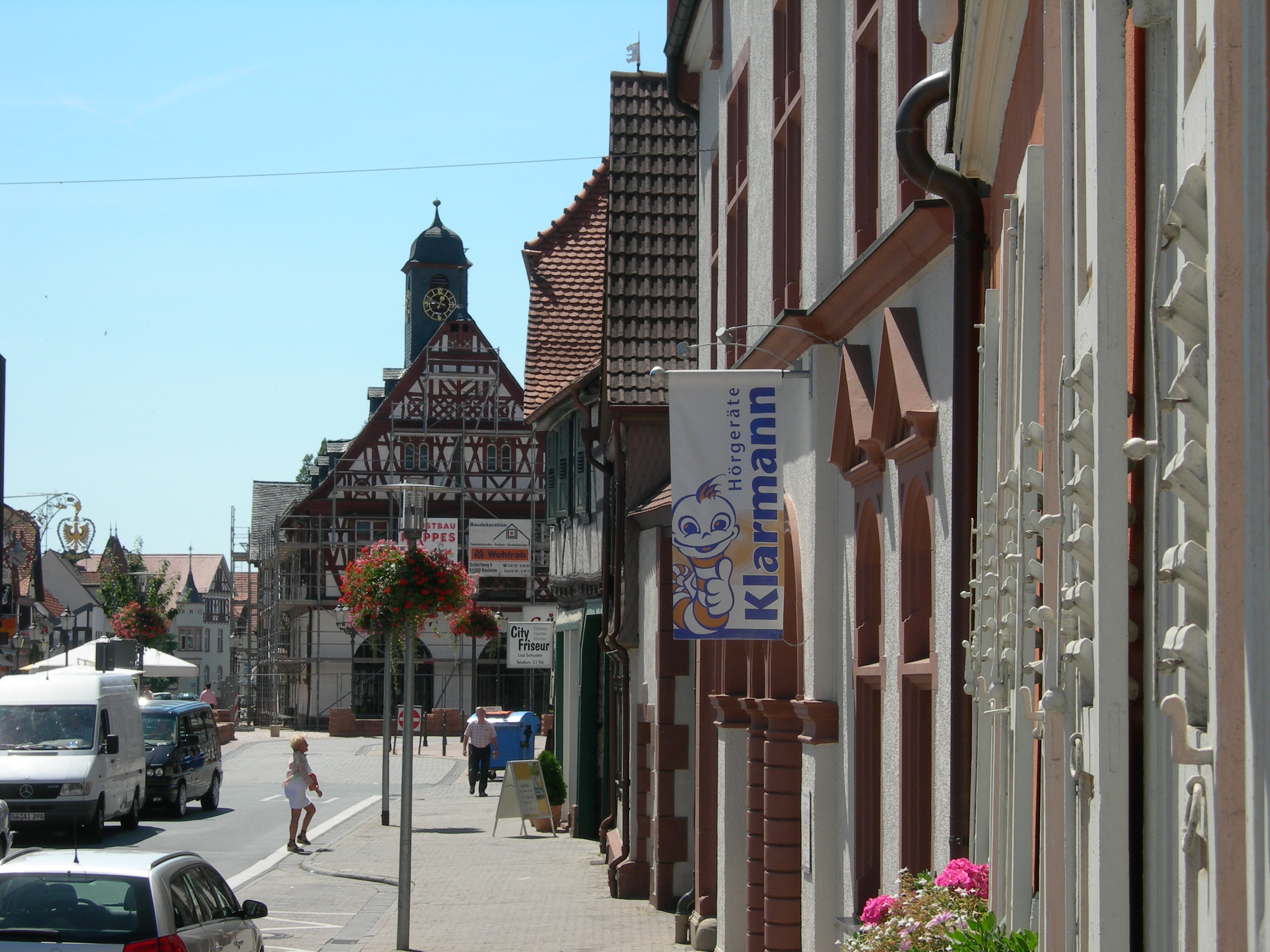
Historic houses
