= Mörfelden-Walldorf =

- Town
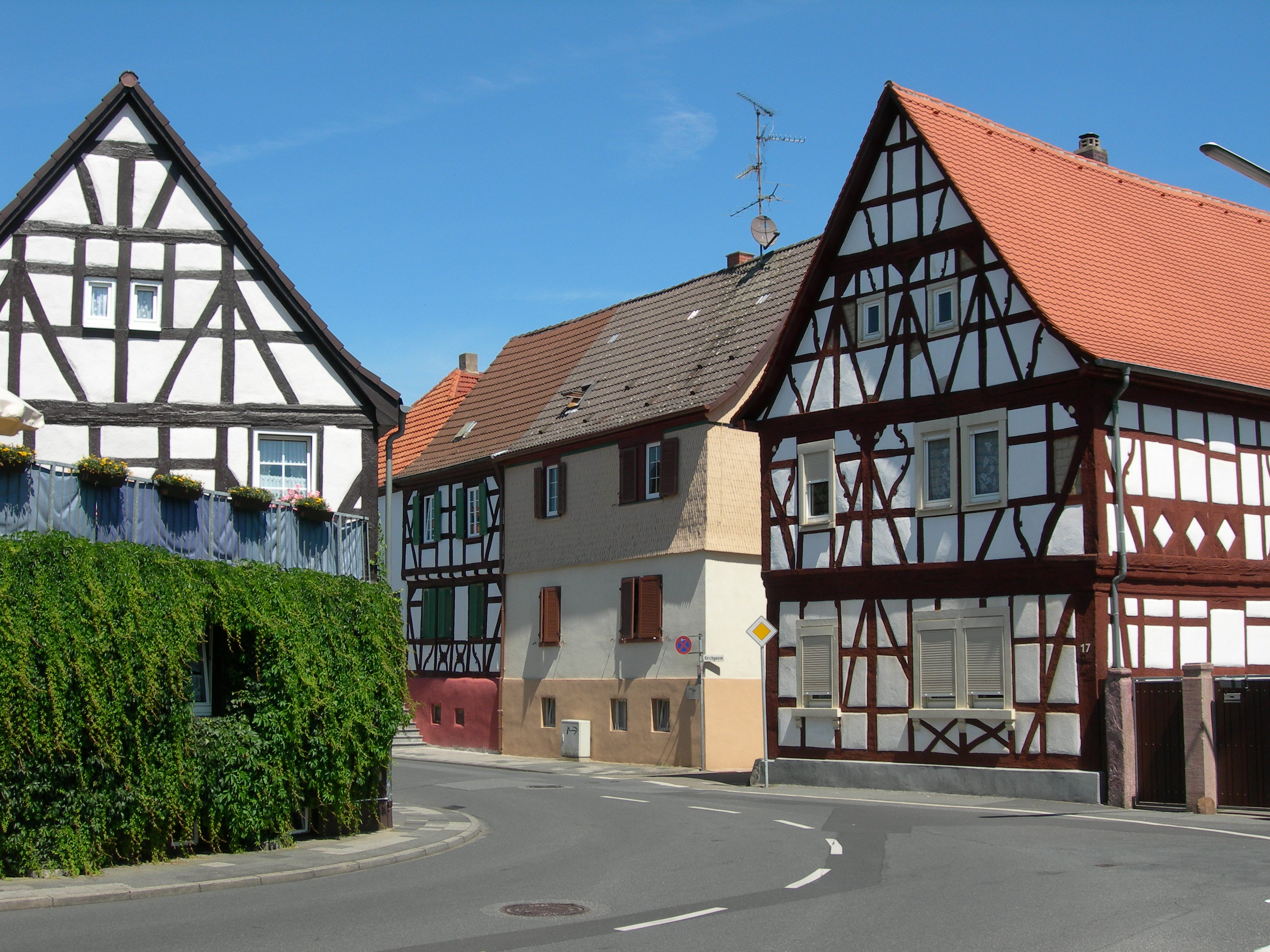
- Half-timbered houses in Mörfelden

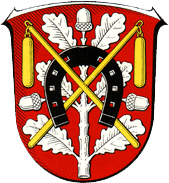
- Coat of arms

- Location of Mörfelden-Walldorf within Groß-Gerau district
- Interactive map of Mörfelden-Walldorf
- Location within Germany Location within Hesse
- Coordinates: 50°00′N 08°35′E
- Country: Germany
- State: Hesse
- Admin. region: Darmstadt
- District: Groß-Gerau

Government
  - Mayor (2019–25): Karsten Groß (Christian Democratic Union (CDU))

Area
  - Total: 44.13 km^{2} (17.04 sq mi)
- Elevation: 100 m (330 ft)

Population (2025-12-31)
  - Total: 31,441
  - Density: 712.5/km^{2} (1,845/sq mi)
- Time zone: UTC+01:00 (CET)
  - Summer (DST): UTC+02:00 (CEST)
- Postal codes: 64546
- Dialling codes: 06105
- Vehicle registration: GG
- Website: www.moerfelden-walldorf.de

Mörfelden-Walldorf (German pronunciation: [ˈmœʁfɛldn̩ ˈvaldɔʁf]) is a town in the Groß-Gerau district, situated in the Frankfurt Rhine-Main region in the federal state (Bundesland) Hesse, Germany.

== Geography ==
=== Location ===
Mörfelden-Walldorf is situated within a triangle formed by the South Hessian cities of Frankfurt am Main, Darmstadt and Wiesbaden, near Frankfurt International Airport.

=== Neighbouring communities ===
Mörfelden-Walldorf borders in the north on the district-free city of Frankfurt am Main and the town of Neu-Isenburg (Offenbach district), in the east on the town of Langen and the community of Egelsbach (both in Offenbach district), in the south on the community of Erzhausen, the town of Weiterstadt (both in Darmstadt-Dieburg) and the community of Büttelborn, and in the west on the town of Groß-Gerau, the community of Nauheim and the town of Rüsselsheim.

=== Constituent communities ===
As its name suggests, Mörfelden-Walldorf consists of two constituent communities, named Mörfelden and Walldorf. There was a third one, called Guntheim, which once lay within the current municipal area of Mörfelden-Walldorf, but it was abandoned in 1647.

== History ==
Mörfelden was first mentioned in the "Lorscher Reichsurbar" of 830 to 850 under the name "Mersenualt". The church was mentioned as early as 1304 as being the "Parish Church with branch at the Gundhof". During the Middle Ages, the surrounding forests belonged to the Dreieich Royal Hunting Woods (Wildbann Dreieich), which maintained one of its 30 woods in Mörfelden. In 1600, Mörfelden passed to Hesse-Darmstadt.

In the 15th and 16th centuries, Mörfelden became a significant tradepost with a population of 500, but the Thirty Years' War set back the development of the village. It was repeatedly plundered and ravaged, and the plague took its toll. In the 19th century, however, the village benefited anew from economic development, and from the arrival of a railway line. The village developed early on into a community of workers, who commuted towards nearby cities. The inhabitants specialised as construction workers, and Mörfelden became known as the "bricklayers village".

After World War II, many refugees and expellees from Germany's former Eastern territories settled here. Mörfelden was raised to town status in 1972.

Walldorf was founded in 1699 as "Waldenserkolonie am Gundhof", was given the name Walldorf in 1715 and was raised to town status in 1962.

From about 23 August to 24 November 1944, there was a concentration camp in Walldorf into which were brought 1,700 Jewish girls and women from Hungary to work at runway and taxiway expansion and repair at Frankfurt Airport. This chapter in the town's history had been forgotten until 1972 when three interested youths rediscovered it. Since then, a film called Rollbahn has dealt with the theme.

The town of Mörfelden-Walldorf came into being on 1 January 1977 through the merger of the until then independent towns of Mörfelden and Walldorf in the face of pressure from Frankfurt to amalgamate with that city.

Guntheim is the third community in Mörfelden-Walldorf's history. It lay in Walldorf's northeast. It had its first documentary mention in 1307 under the name villa Guntheim. There was also a Gunthof nearby, but the Gunthof (always with the definite article) came to be part of Guntheim in the 15th century through division of inheritance. The village ceased to be a population centre in 1647.

Guntheim was established in Merovingian times (481 – 560) as a Frankish military colony at the junction of some old Roman roads in the forest.

== Politics ==
The so-called workers' parties have traditionally been strong in Mörfelden-Walldorf. Both communities, then independent local authorities, were strongholds of the KPD. Before 1933, the "bricklayers village" Mörfelden had the first Communist mayor in the state of Hesse, and was nicknamed "Little Moscow". In the elections of March 13, 1932, the Communist candidate Ernst Thälmann received 1,737 votes in the town, against 850 for Hindenburg and just 264 for Hitler.

Once the Nazis established itself in power, 70 KPD members in the village, which had just 5,000 inhabitants at the time, were deported to the concentration camp Osthofen.

At the municipal elections held on 26 March 2006, the SPD remained the strongest party despite notable losses. The overall winner was the DKP, which has been represented on town council here since the 1970s. The town is one of only a few remaining DKP strongholds in Germany, along with nearby Reinheim, the towns of Bottrop, Essen-North and Gladbeck in the Ruhr area, and Heidenheim and Püttlingen.

Mörfelden-Walldorf's council is made up of 45 councillors, with seats apportioned thus, in accordance with municipal elections held on 26 March 2006:

Party	Share 2006	Share 2001	Change	Seats 2006	Seats 2001	Change
SPD	38.6%	43.7%	-5.1%	18	20	-2
CDU	28.4%	26.8%	+1.6%	13	12	+1
Greens	16.3%	16.4%	-0.1%	7	7	0
DKP/LL	11.6%	8.3%	+3.3%	5	4	+1
FDP	5.0%	4.8%	+0.2%	2	2	0

Mayoral elections were held in 2019, so there is a new town mayor Thomas Winkler (Alliance 90/The Greens) since 20 July 2019. He was the winner in second round with 57%. Mayoral elections were also held in 2007. In the first round, SPD candidate Heinz Peter Becker received 48.4% of the vote, CDU candidate Bernd Körner received 29,2%, and the DKP candidate Gerhard Schulmeyer received 11.9%.

There were some notable differences between the two communities; in Walldorf, Körner received 33.2% and in Mörfelden just 24.8%, whereas in Mörfelden, Schulmeyer received 16.9%, and in Walldorf just 7.4%.

In the second round, Becker defeated Körner by 59.8% to 40.2%. As new mayor, he succeeded the SPD politician Bernhard Brehl.

The 2026 Mayoral elections marked another shift in leading party. Thomas Winkler, although receiving around 36% of the votes, could not win the second round and with roughly 53% of the vote (around 5000 votes) CDU candidate Karsten Groß was voted mayor. Even though Groß merely received 31% in the first round, voters favoured him over their previous mayor. Participation in the elections however was at 45% and 40% respectively. This is an increase from the 2019 election where only 41%/39% of the eligible citizen cast their vote.

=== Coat of arms ===
Mörfelden-Walldorf's civic coat of arms might heraldically be described thus: In gules an oak tree with six leaves and three acorns argent, thereover per saltire two flails Or, entwined about which, ends downturned, a horseshoe sable.

The town's current arms are a composite of Mörfelden's and Walldorf's old arms from the time before they were united.

Both Mörfelden's and Walldorf's arms had an oak tree as one of the charges, the former having a red oak on a silver shield and the latter the reverse. Furthermore, Mörfelden's arms had the black horseshoe over the oak whereas Walldorf's had the crossed golden flails.

Walldorf only began using arms in the early 19th century, at which time the mayor's chain of office bore a shield with the oak, the flails and the letter W. Much the same composition was officially adopted as the village's arms in 1927, but without the W. The oak is said to stand for the forests, especially the Dreieich Hunting Woods, and the flails are said to symbolize agriculture.

Mörfelden's armorial history is somewhat longer. A seal from 1612 (but dating from the previous century) has more or less the same composition, with the oak and the horseshoe. Likewise, the oak stands for the Dreieich Hunting Woods. The horseshoe is apparently an older village symbol. The arms were adopted in 1900, although this was not made official until 1926.

There also seems to have been a compromise as to the number of leaves borne by the oak. Mörfelden's arms had five and Walldorf's had eight, whereas Mörfelden-Walldorf's have six.

== Economy ==
Martinair operates its German office in Mörfelden-Walldorf.

== Sights ==
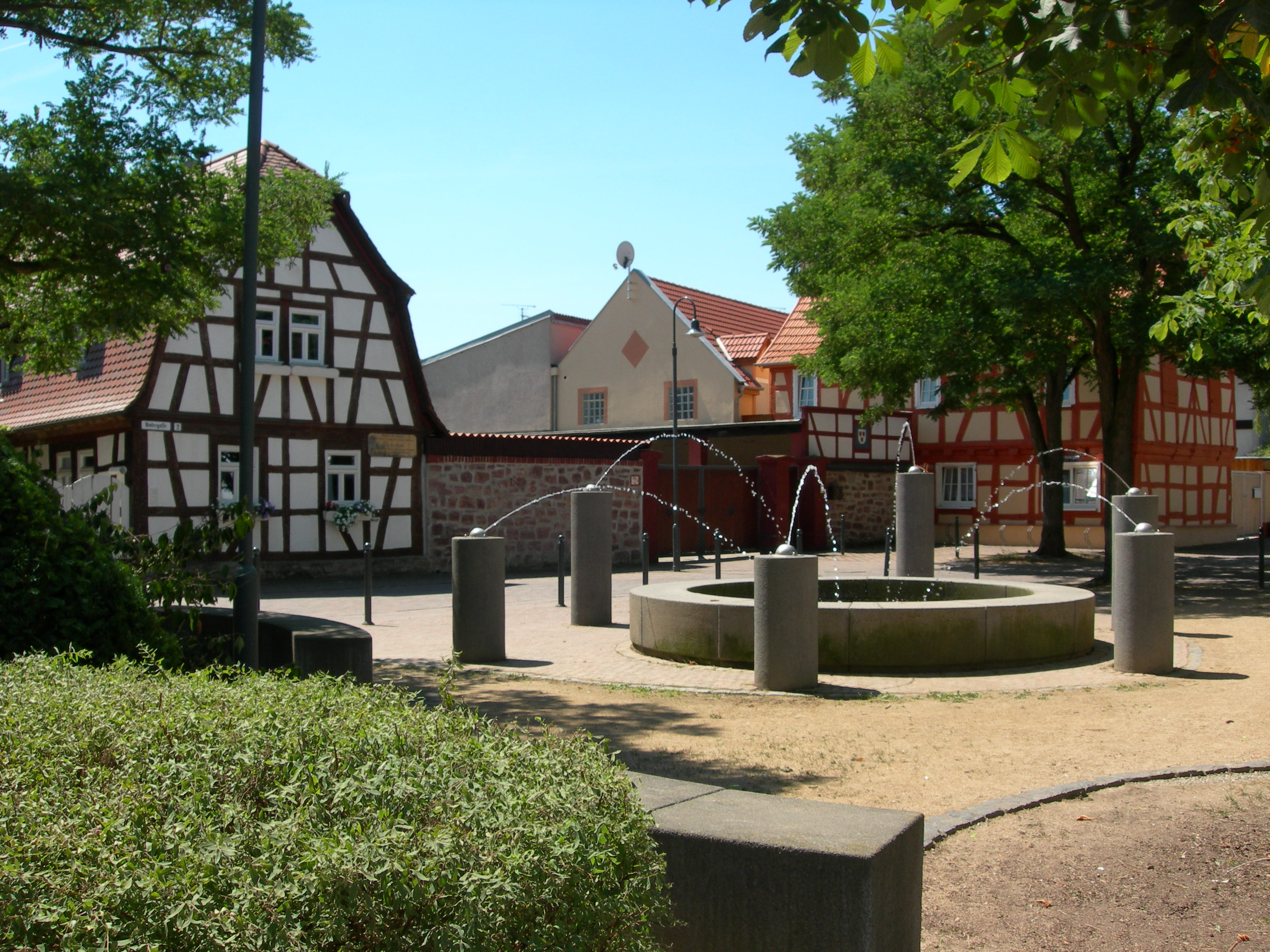
Fountain and more half-timbered houses

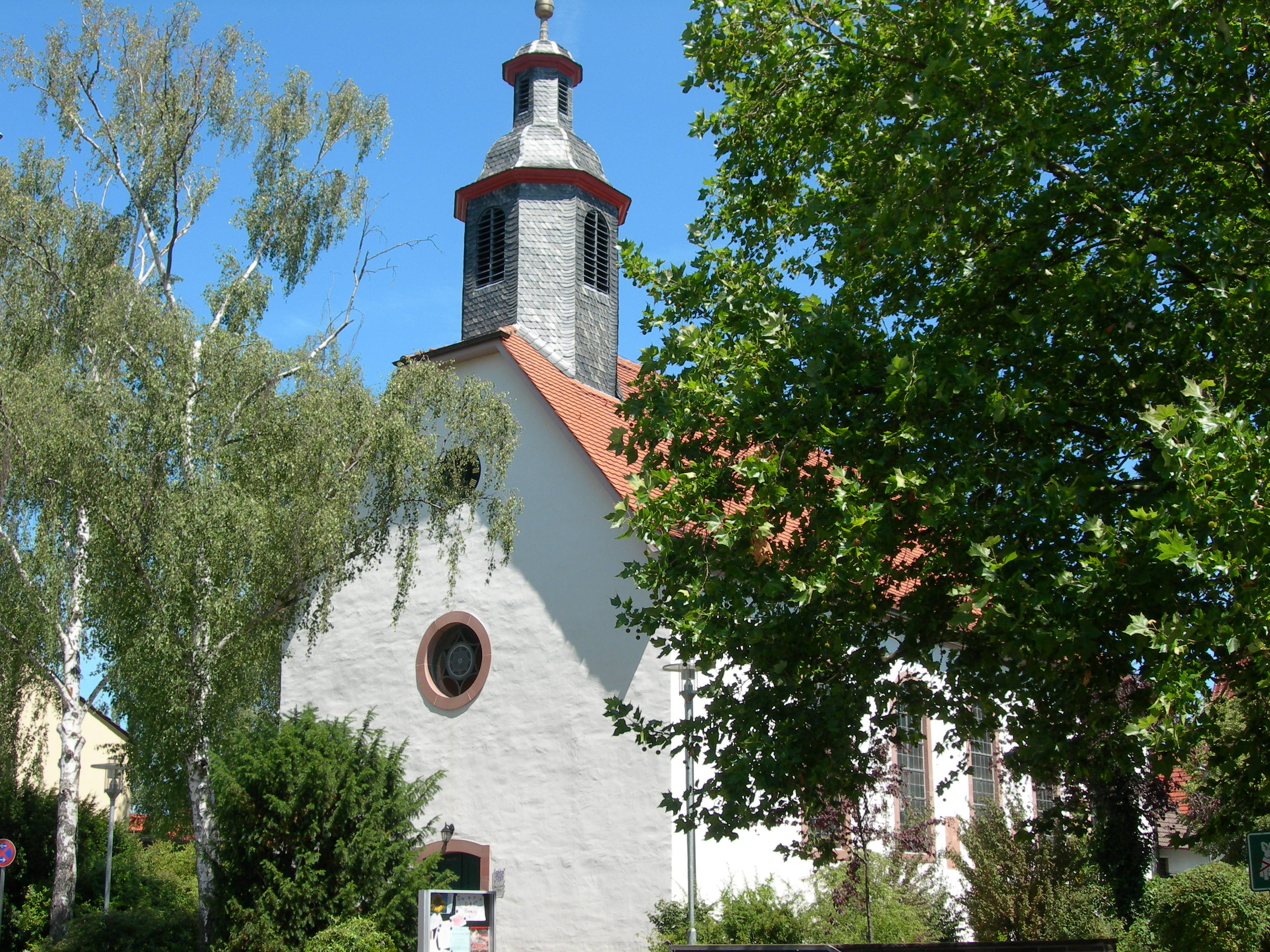
Evangelical church in Mörfelden

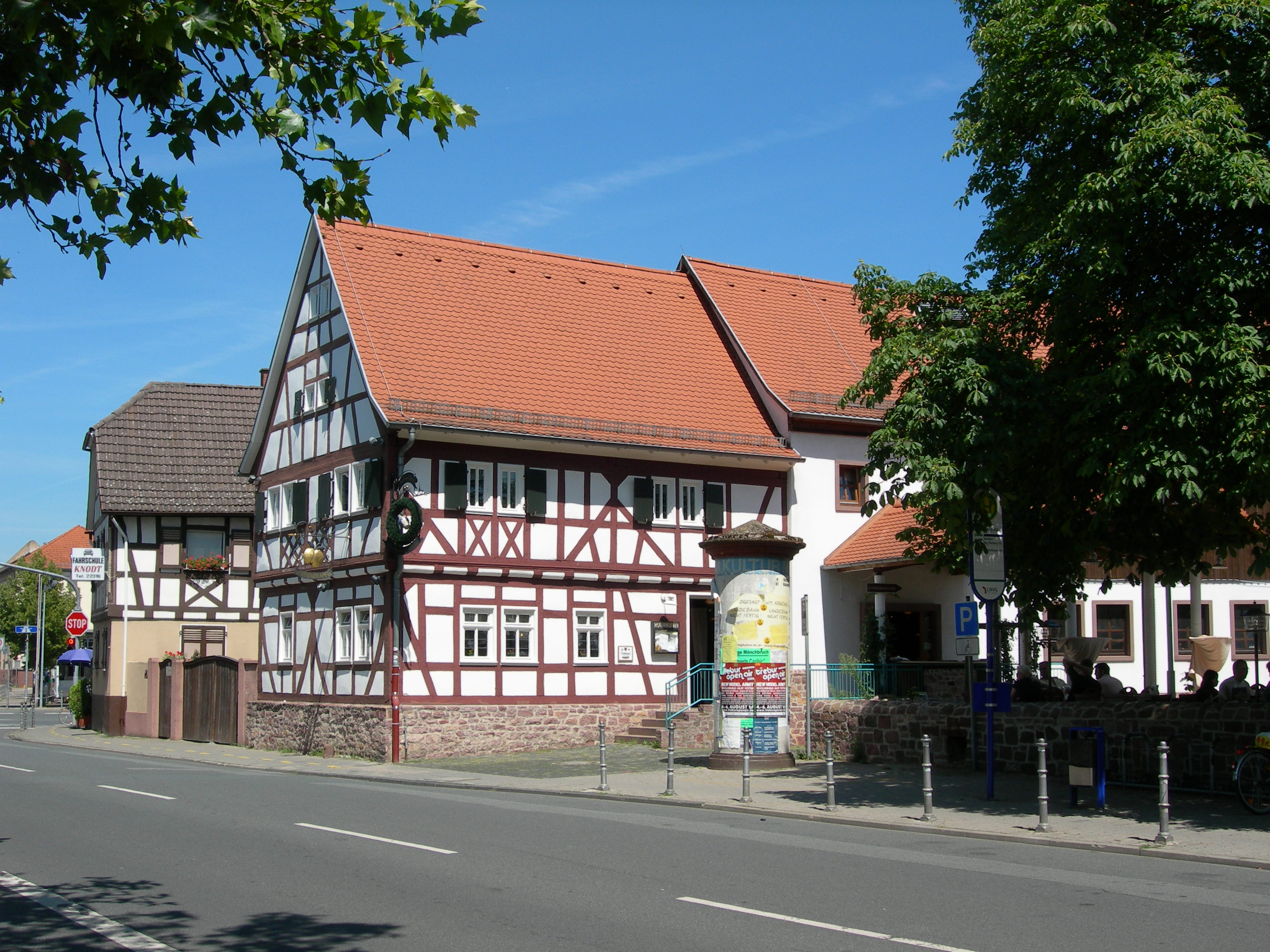
Historic inn "Goldener Apfel"
- Walldorf: Gundhof
- Mörfelden: Dalles
- Mörfelden: Watertower

== Culture ==
=== Festivals ===
- Anglerfest Walldorf
- Altstadtfest (Old Town Festival – not regular)
- Faschingsdisco "Rummel im Busch"
- Gickelfest Walldorf
- Gottesdienste in der Hüttenkirche
- Grillfest am Dalles des Kegelclubs Olympia Mörfelden
- Hinkelfest Mörfelden
- Historienfest am Gundhof (history fair)
- Hüttenfest der Angler Mörfelden
- Jazzfest
- Latwejefest
- Merfeller Kerb (church fair on St. Gallus's Day – 16 October)
- „Rund um die Kersch" (Kirche) (Evangelical parish festival)
- Skulpturen im Park-Festival (every summer)
- Vatertagsfeste
- Walldorfer Kerb (church fair)
- Weinfest (wine festival)

=== Museums ===
- Mörfelder Heimatmuseum
- Walldorfer Heimatmuseum

(both local history museums)

== Twin towns – sister cities ==
Mörfelden-Walldorf is twinned with:

- Torre Pellice, Italy
- Vitrolles, France
- Wageningen, Netherlands

== See also ==
- Waldensians
