= Schwarzbach (Ried) =

River in Hesse, Germany

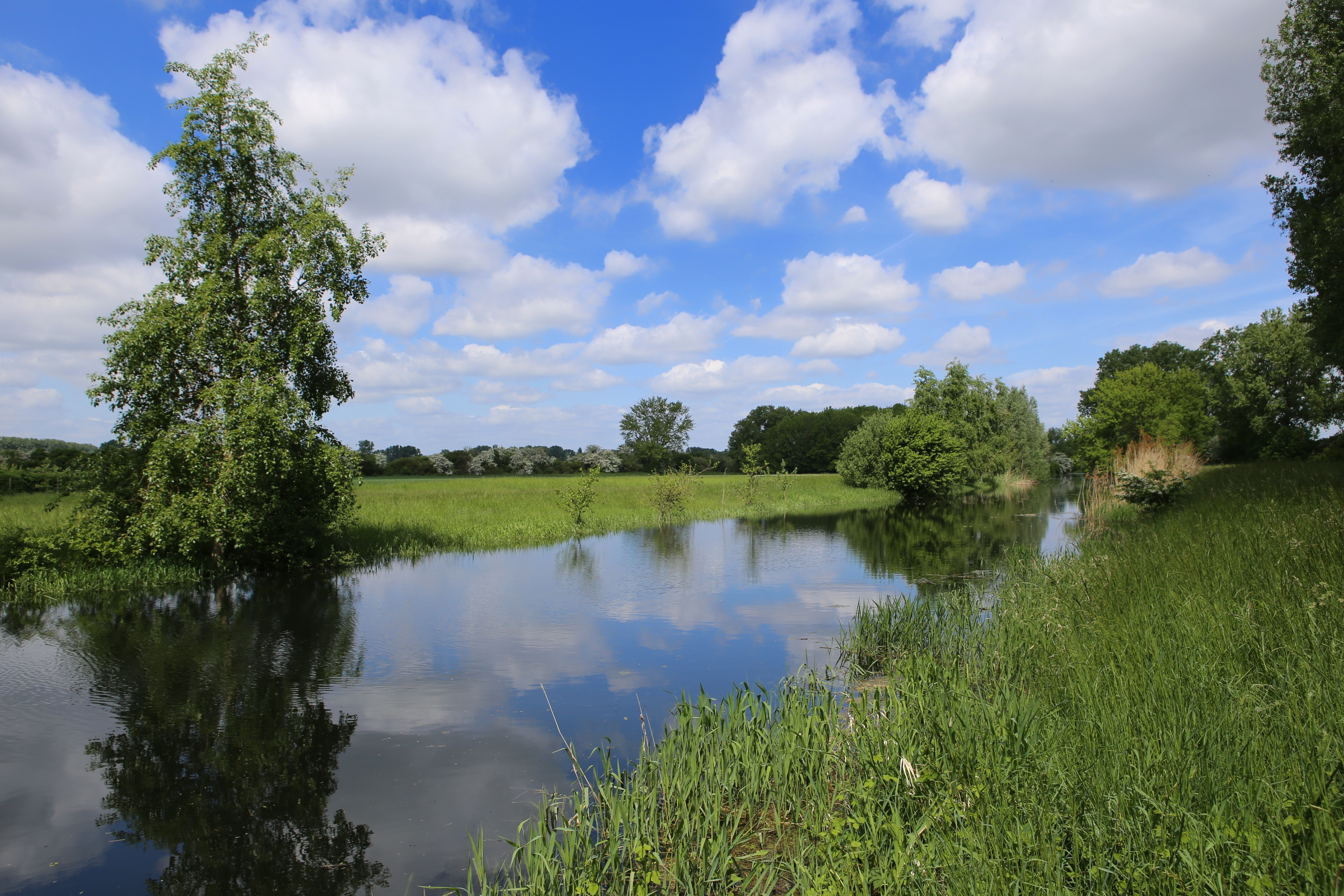
- The Schwarzbach at Astheim

Location
- Country: Germany
- State: Hesse

Physical characteristics
- Mouth
  - location: Rhine
  - coordinates: 49.9697°N 8.3298°E
- Length: 43.5 km (27.0 mi)
- Basin size: 514 km^{2} (198 sq mi)

Basin features
- Progression: Rhine→ North Sea

Schwarzbach (German pronunciation: [ˈʃvaʁtsˌbax]) is a river of the Hessian Ried, Hesse, Germany. It is a right tributary of the Rhine in Ginsheim. Including its right source river Gundbach, it is 43.5 km long.

== See also ==
- List of rivers of Hesse
