= Hessian Ried =

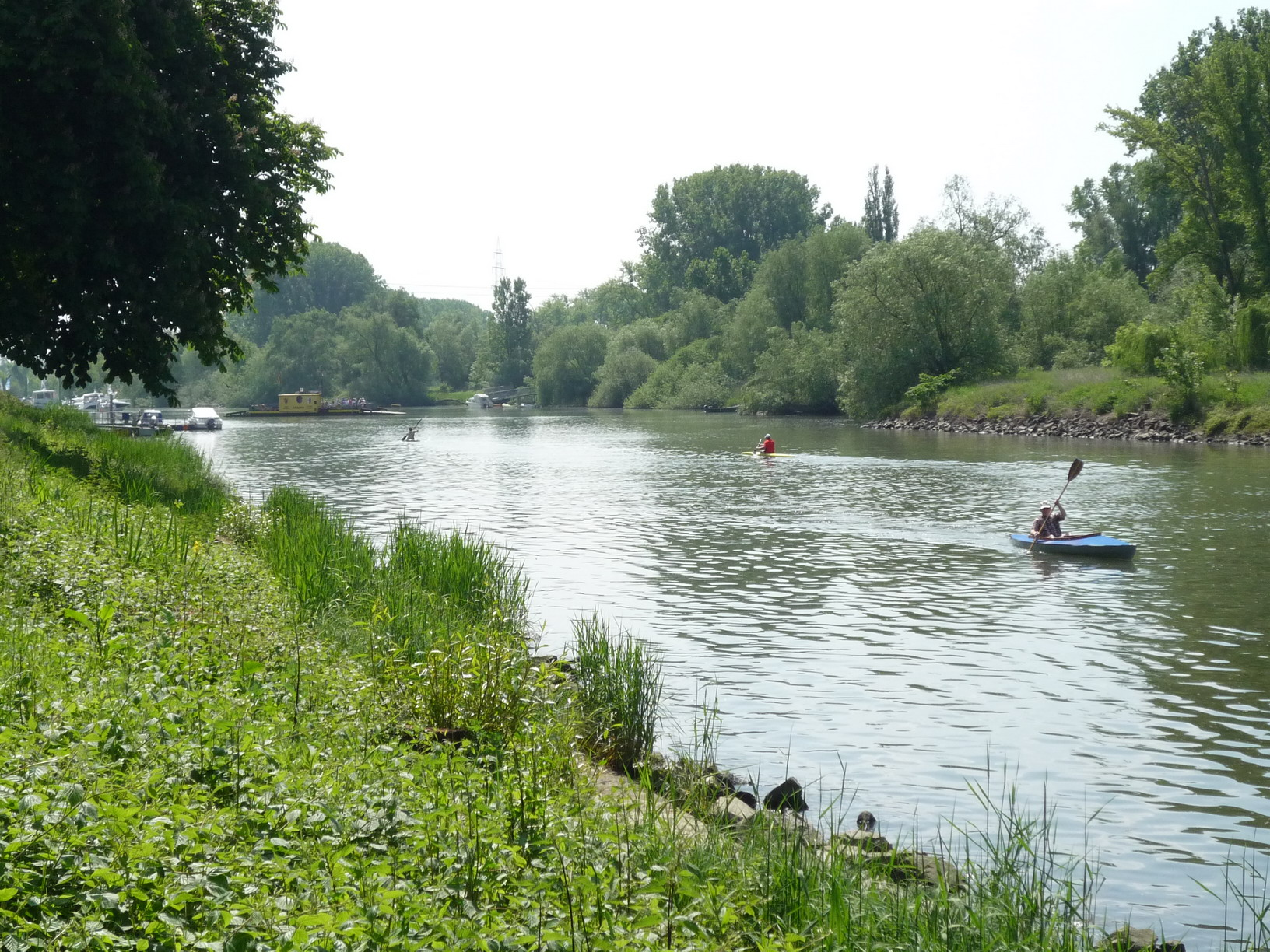
Old branch of the Rhine between Ginsheim and the former Rhine island of Nonnau

The Hessian Ried (German: Hessische Ried) is a low-lying, agricultural region that forms part of the northeastern area of the Upper Rhine Plain. It is situated in South Hesse in west central Germany.

== Location and description ==
The Hessian Ried lies between the River Rhine to the west, the Bergstraße route in the east and between the town of Lampertheim in the south to town of Groß-Gerau.

In former times the lowlands of the Ried were largely marshland and repeatedly affected by serious flooding of the Rhine and Weschnitz. During the time of the Roman Empire the area was therefore avoided and the road, the Strata Montana, on the Bergstraße, built higher up along the edge of the Odenwald. Later Lorsch Abbey became an important centre in the middle of the Ried.

Not until the regulation of the Rhine and Weschnitz did it become increasingly suitable for agriculture. In addition, widespread drainage produced land for agricultural use in the wake of the "General Cultural Plan" of 1925. In the mild climate asparagus and tobacco thrive. Because of the proximity of the large centres of population nearby (the Rhine-Main and Rhine-Neckar regions) vegetables and lettuce are grown widely. Due to the low precipitation in the Hessian Ried, increasing amounts of artificial watering is needed.

Heavy groundwater extraction for public water supplies, for industry and for agriculture have, especially in dry periods (around 1976 and 1993), led to subsidence and damage to buildings and, especially in the forests and wetlands to damage to groundwater-dependent vegetation. This led to considerable disputes between the water companies, landowners, farmers, the forestry industry and conservation agencies. These conflicts were defused by the introduction of a more flexible management of groundwater extraction that is now oriented towards the groundwater-land relationship. In addition the Hessian Ried Water Association was founded in 1979 and had worked to improve the groundwater.

== Origin of the name ==
The name Hessisches Ried is probably derived from the reeds that once covered much of the landscape. Frequent flooding - especially from the Rhine and the Weschnitz – made the Hessian Ried an ideal habitat for these plants. Today large beds of reed are very rare and are mostly found in nature reserves.

Another explanation may be that Ried was the name given to a forest clearing of the area in order to make it usable for agriculture.

== Sub-regions ==
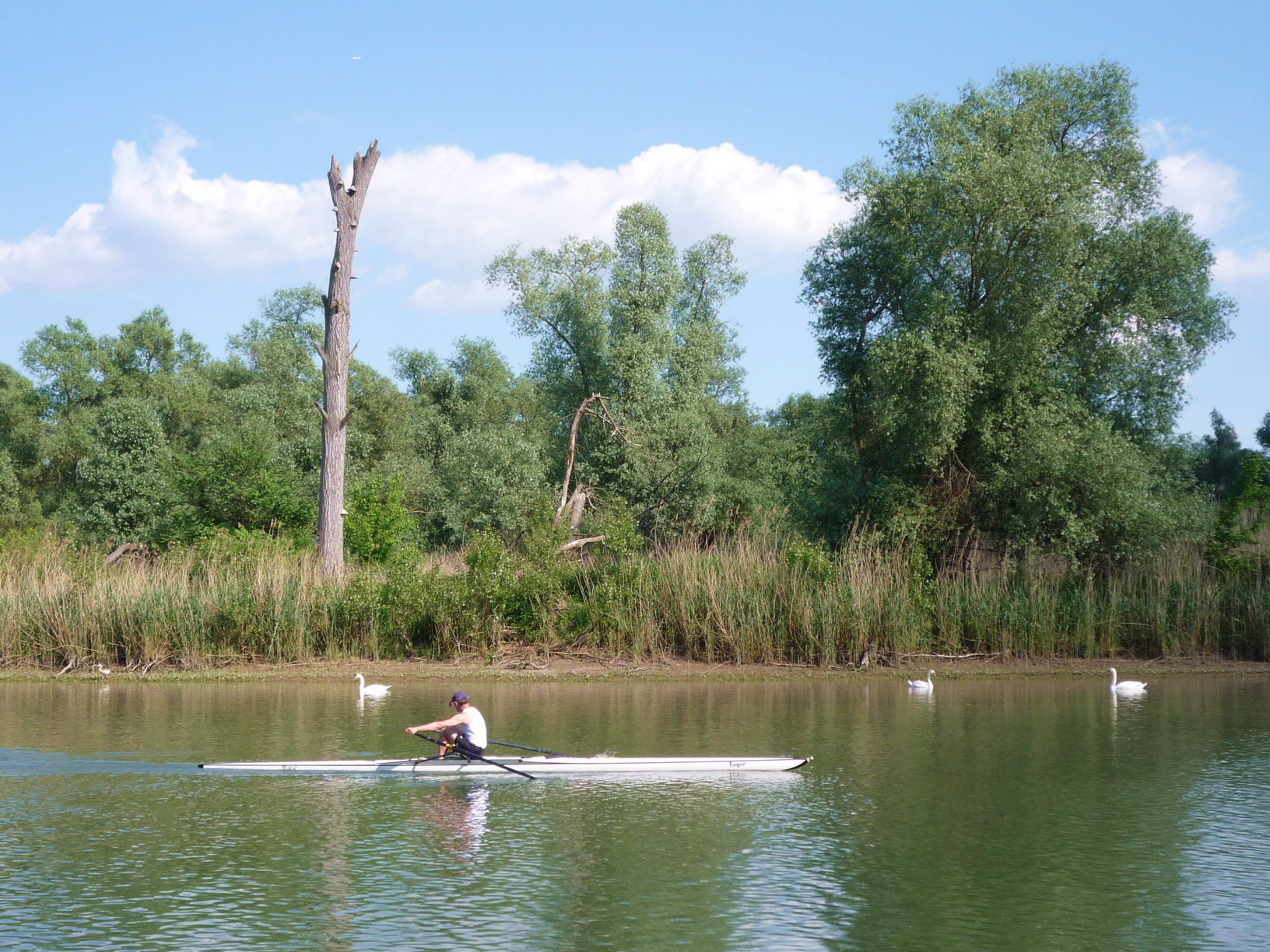
The Altrhein between Kühkopf and Knoblochsaue

- Altrhein
  - Kühkopf-Knoblochsaue – nature reserve with the island of Kühkopf and the Knoblochsaue to the north
  - Rhine island of Nonnenau near Ginsheim
- Schwarzbachaue near Trebur
- Riedsee bei Leeheim
- Riedsee bei Biblis
- Biedensand nature reserve near Lampertheim

== Towns and villages in the Hessian Ried ==
- The Alsbach-Hähnlein villages of: (Alsbach lies on the Bergstraße)
  - Hähnlein
- The Bensheim quarters of (Bensheim itself lies on the Bergstraße)
  - Fehlheim
  - Langwaden
  - Schwanheim
- Biblis and its villages:
  - Nordheim
  - Wattenheim
- Biebesheim am Rhein
- Bürstadt and its quarters:
  - Bobstadt
  - Riedrode
- Büttelborn
- Einhausen (Hesse)
- Gernsheim and its quarters:
  - Allmendfeld
  - Klein-Rohrheim
- Griesheim
- Groß-Gerau and its quarters:
  - Berkach
  - Dornberg
  - Dornheim
  - Wallerstädten
  - Nauheim
- Groß-Rohrheim
- Lampertheim and its quarters:
  - Hofheim
  - Hüttenfeld
  - Neuschloß
  - Rosengarten
- Lorsch
- Pfungstadt and its quarters of:
  - Eich
  - Eschollbrücken
  - Hahn
- Riedstadt and its town quarters:
  - Crumstadt
  - Erfelden
  - Goddelau
  - Leeheim
  - Wolfskehlen
- Stockstadt
- Rüsselsheim with the town quarter of:
  - Bauschheim
- Trebur and its villages of:
  - Astheim
  - Geinsheim
  - Hessenaue
  - Kornsand
- Der Zwingenberg quarter (Zwingenberg itself lies on the Bergstraße)
  - Rodau

== Literature ==
- Peter Prinz-Grimm und Ingeborg Grimm: Wetterau und Mainebene. Borntraeger, Berlin/Stuttgart, 2002, ISBN 3-443-15076-4 (Sammlung geologischer Führer 93), especially p. 12.
