= Grundelbach =

River in Germany

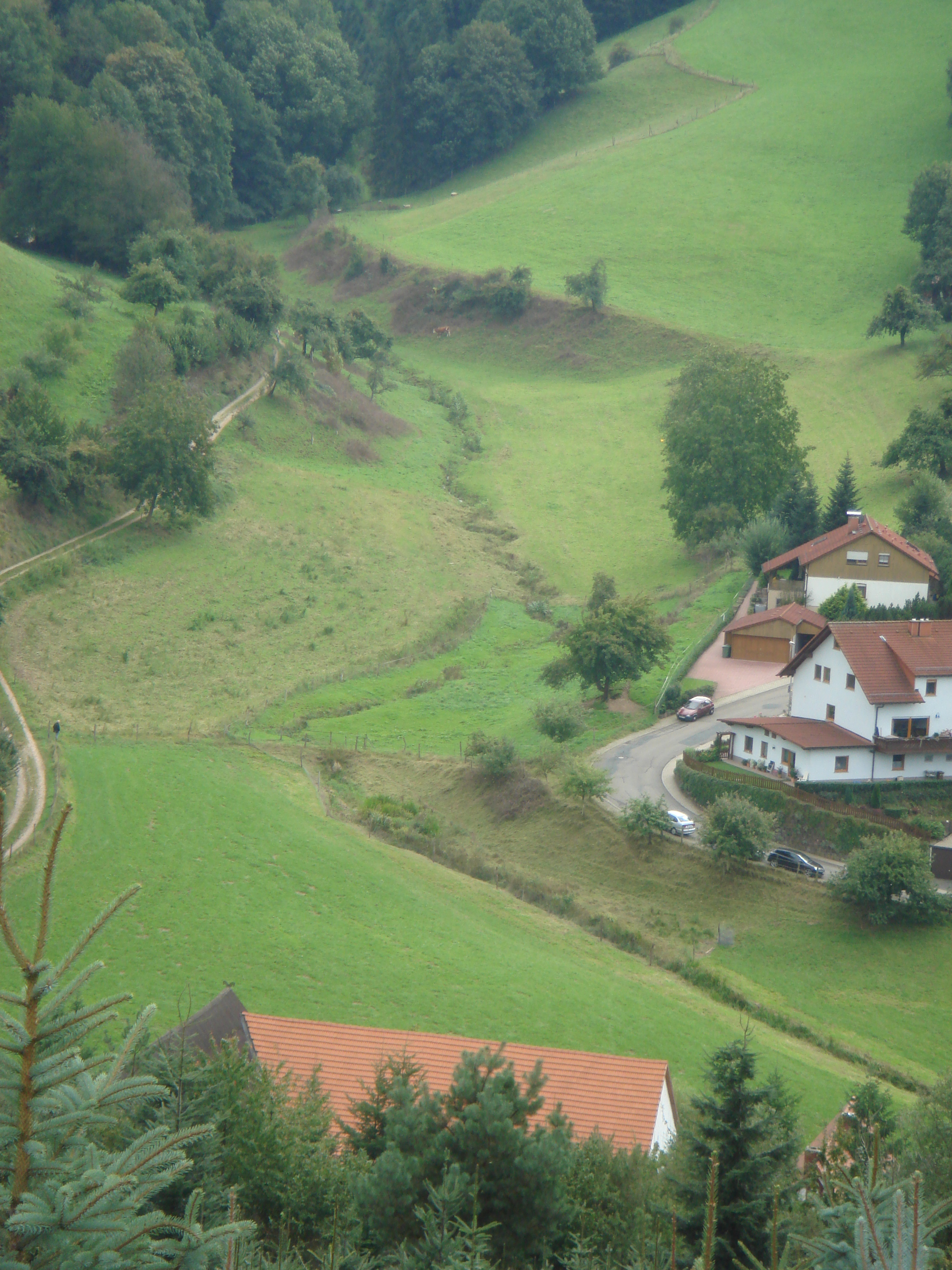

Location
- Country: Germany
- States: Hesse and Baden-Württemberg

Physical characteristics
- Mouth
  - location: Weschnitz
  - coordinates: 49°33′14″N 8°40′31″E
- Length: 10.5 km (6.5 mi)

Basin features
- Progression: Weschnitz→ Rhine→ North Sea

Grundelbach is a river of Baden-Württemberg and Hesse, Germany. It passes through Gorxheimertal and flows into the Weschnitz in Weinheim.

== See also ==
- List of rivers of Baden-Württemberg
- List of rivers of Hesse
