= Weschnitz =

River in Germany

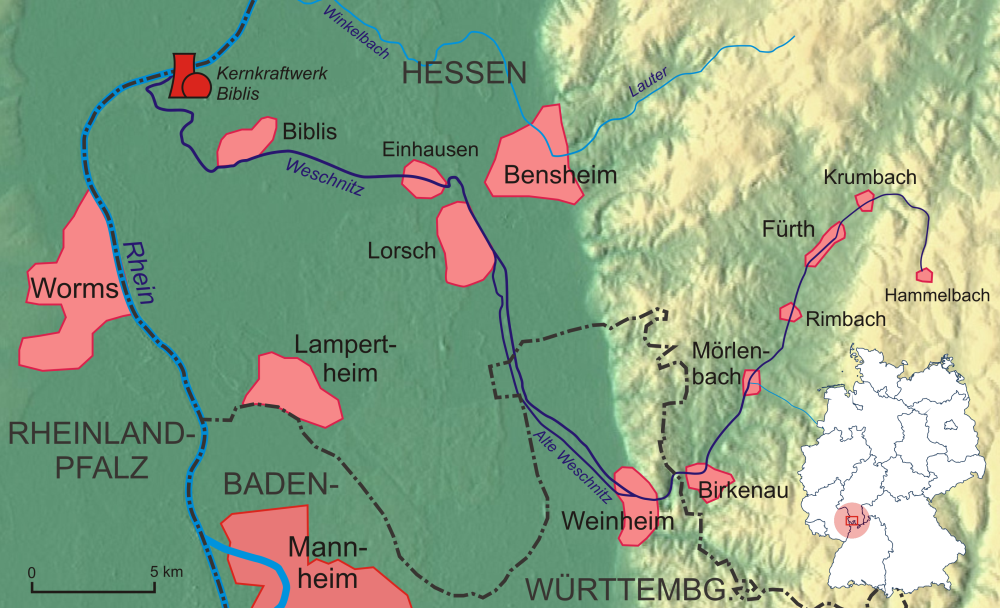
- The course of the Weschnitz

Location
- Country: Germany
- States: Hesse; Baden-Württemberg

Physical characteristics
- Source
  - coordinates: 49°38′22.4″N 8°49′43.1″E
  - elevation: 455 m (1,493 ft)
- Mouth
  - coordinates: 49°42′39″N 8°24′36″E
  - elevation: 84.9 m (279 ft)
- Length: 59.4 km (36.9 mi)
- Basin size: 438.3 km^{2} (169.2 sq mi)

Basin features
- Progression: Rhine→ North Sea

The Weschnitz is a 59.4-kilometre-long (36.9 mi) right tributary of the Rhine running through the German states of Hesse and Baden-Württemberg. The name of the river traces to the Celtic god Visucius, who was worshiped in the region.

The river source is in the Odenwald, in the town of Grasellenbach. It then flows in a westerly direction through a number of communities, including Fürth, Rimbach, Mörlenbach and Birkenau. At Weinheim, the river splits into two branches as it enters the Upper Rhine Plain. The two courses join at Lorsch. It then flows through the communities of Einhausen and Biblis before emptying into the Rhine at the Biblis Nuclear Power Plant.

== See also ==
- List of rivers of Baden-Württemberg
- List of rivers of Hesse
