= Bergstraße (district) =

Coordinates: 49°38′27″N 8°38′40″E

- District
- Flag Coat of arms
- Country: Germany
- State: Hesse
- Adm. region: Darmstadt
- Capital: Heppenheim

Government
  - District admin.: Christian Engelhardt (CDU)

Area
  - Total: 719.54 km^{2} (277.82 sq mi)

Population (31 December 2024)
  - Total: 274,169
  - Density: 381.03/km^{2} (986.87/sq mi)
- Time zone: UTC+01:00 (CET)
  - Summer (DST): UTC+02:00 (CEST)
- Vehicle registration: HP
- Website: kreis-bergstrasse.de

Bergstraße (German pronunciation: [ˈbɛʁkˌʃtʁaːsə], lit. 'Mountain Road') is a Kreis (district) in the south of Hesse, Germany. It is at the northern end of the Bergstraße route. Neighboring districts are Groß-Gerau, Darmstadt-Dieburg, Odenwaldkreis, Rhein-Neckar-Kreis, the urban district Mannheim, the Rhein-Pfalz-Kreis, and the urban district of Worms. Kreis Bergstraße belongs both to the Rhine Neckar Area and the Rhein-Main Region.

== History ==
The district was created in 1938, when the two former districts Bensheim and Heppenheim were merged.

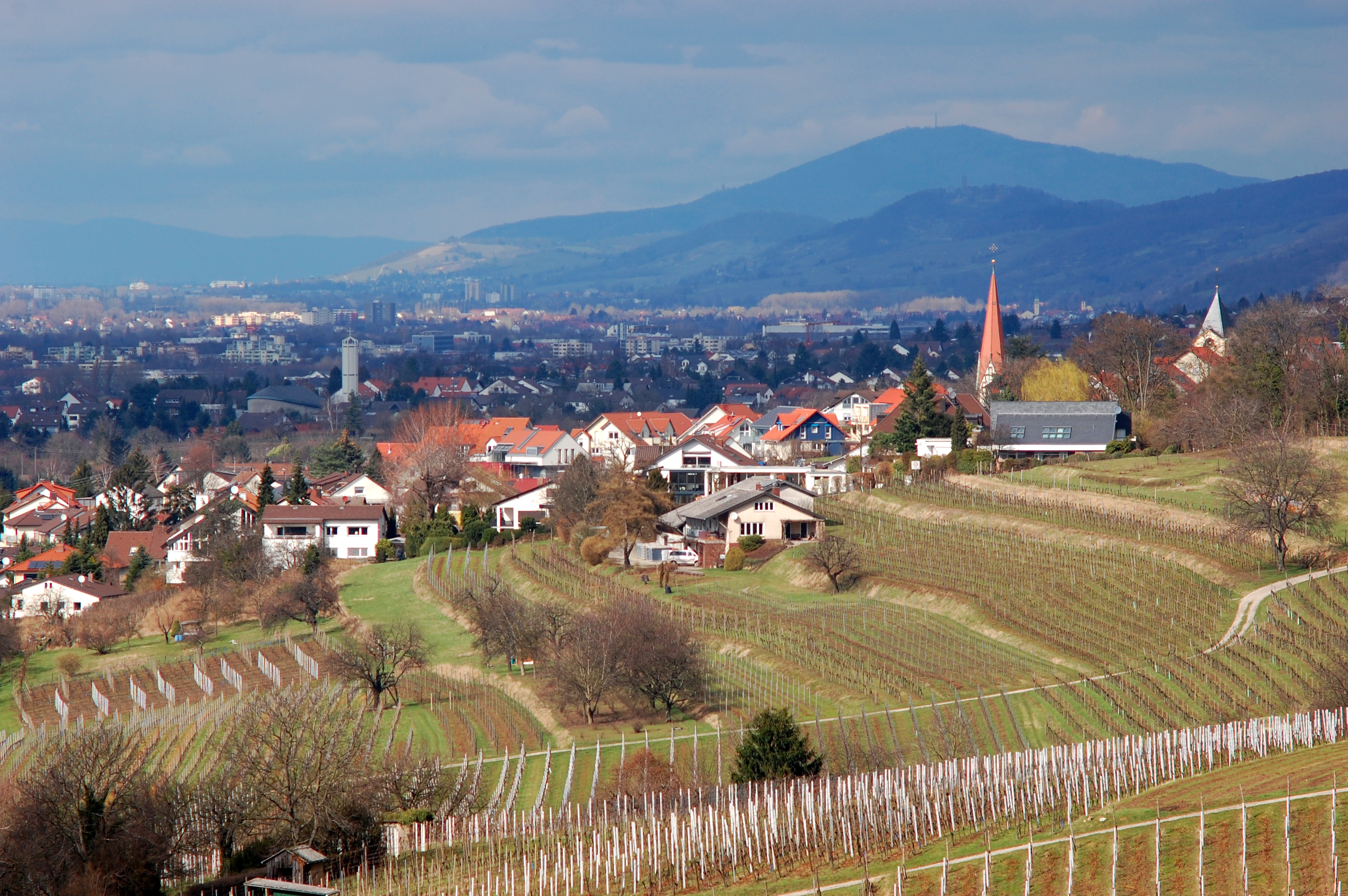

== Geography ==
The Bergstraße district is situated along the western slopes of the Odenwald mountains in southern Hesse, Germany. Its highest point is the Melibokus, a 517-meter (1,696-foot) hill near Zwingenberg. The district derives its name from the historic Bergstraße ("Mountain Road"), an 80-kilometer scenic route that runs from Darmstadt to Wiesloch, with its northern section passing through the district.

== Coat of arms ==
The coat of arms is split into four quarters. In the top-left it shows the Starkenburg castle, which is one of the major landmarks in the district and a reminiscence of the former Province Starkenburg, a former provinces of the Grand Duchy of Hesse, to which the District once belonged. The flower in the top-right stands for the flower-richness in spring. The cross in the bottom-left derives from the coat of arms of the imperial abbey of Lorsch Abbey, and the lion in the bottom-right is the sign of Hesse.

German Formula One driver Sebastian Vettel, who is from Heppenheim, has the Bergstraße coat of arms on the front (chin area) of his racing helmet.

== Politics ==
The Bergstraße electoral district (Wahlkreis 187) is a federal constituency represented in the German Bundestag. Located in southern Hesse, it encompasses the entire Bergstraße district. Established for the inaugural 1949 federal election, it has undergone several numbering changes over the years, currently designated as constituency 187.

In the 2025 federal election, the constituency had 195,419 eligible voters, with a voter turnout of 84.4%. The Christian Democratic Union (CDU) candidate, Dr. Michael Meister, secured the direct mandate with 36.3% of the first votes. Dr. Meister has been serving as the directly elected representative for Bergstraße since 2005, reflecting the CDU's longstanding influence in the region.

== Towns and municipalities ==
Clickable map of towns and municipalities in the district

Towns
- Bensheim
- Bürstadt
- Heppenheim
- Hirschhorn
- Lampertheim
- Lindenfels
- Lorsch
- Neckarsteinach
- Viernheim
- Zwingenberg
Municipalities
- Abtsteinach
- Biblis
- Birkenau
- Einhausen
- Fürth
- Gorxheimertal
- Grasellenbach
- Groß-Rohrheim
- Lautertal
- Mörlenbach
- Rimbach
- Wald-Michelbach
