= Hessentag =

Annual fair and festival in Germany

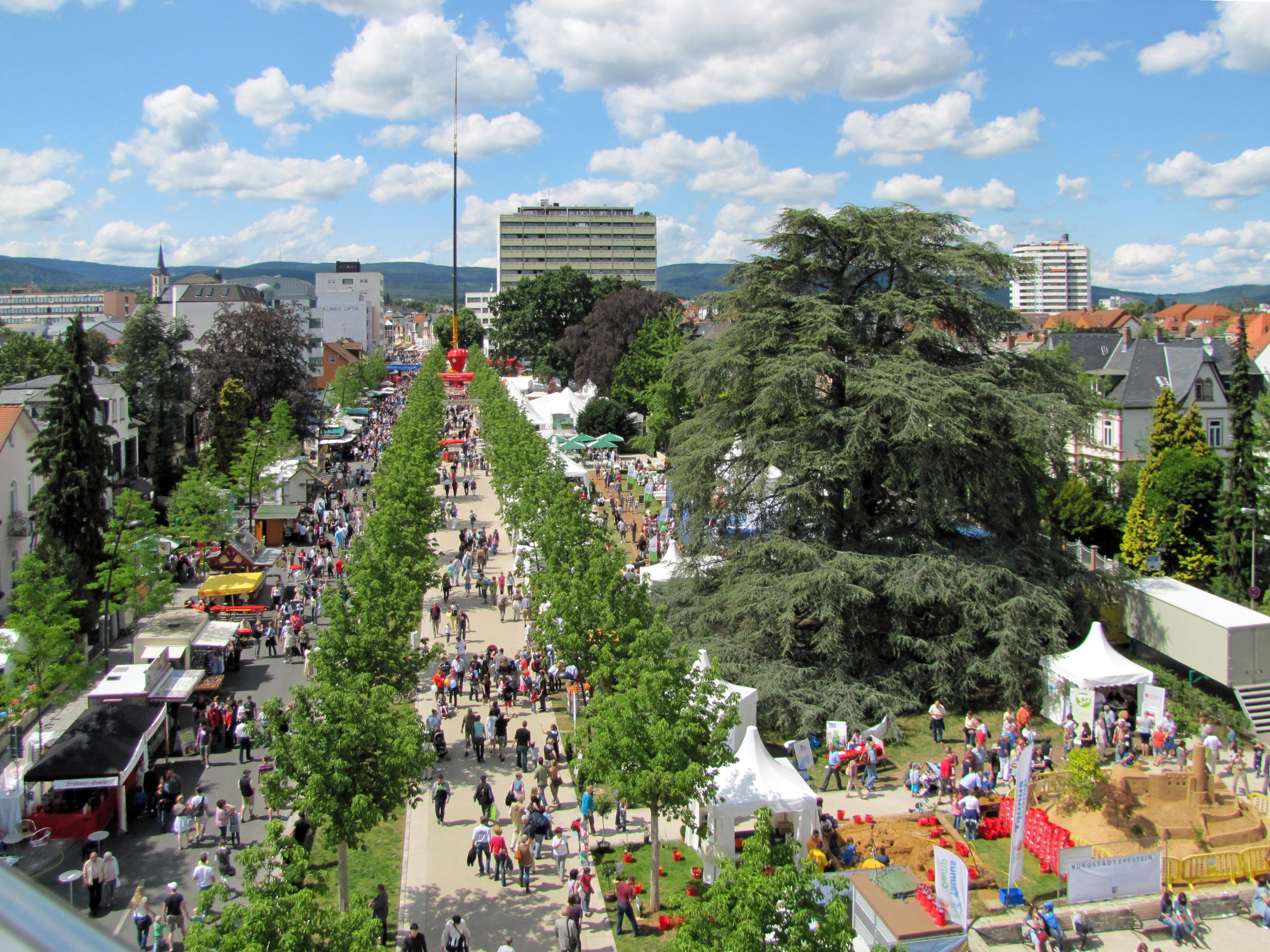
- Oberursel (Taunus), 2011
- Genre: Fair and festival
- Date: Ten days in June
- Frequency: Annual
- Location: Varies
- Inaugurated: 1961; 65 years ago
- Organiser: Hesse

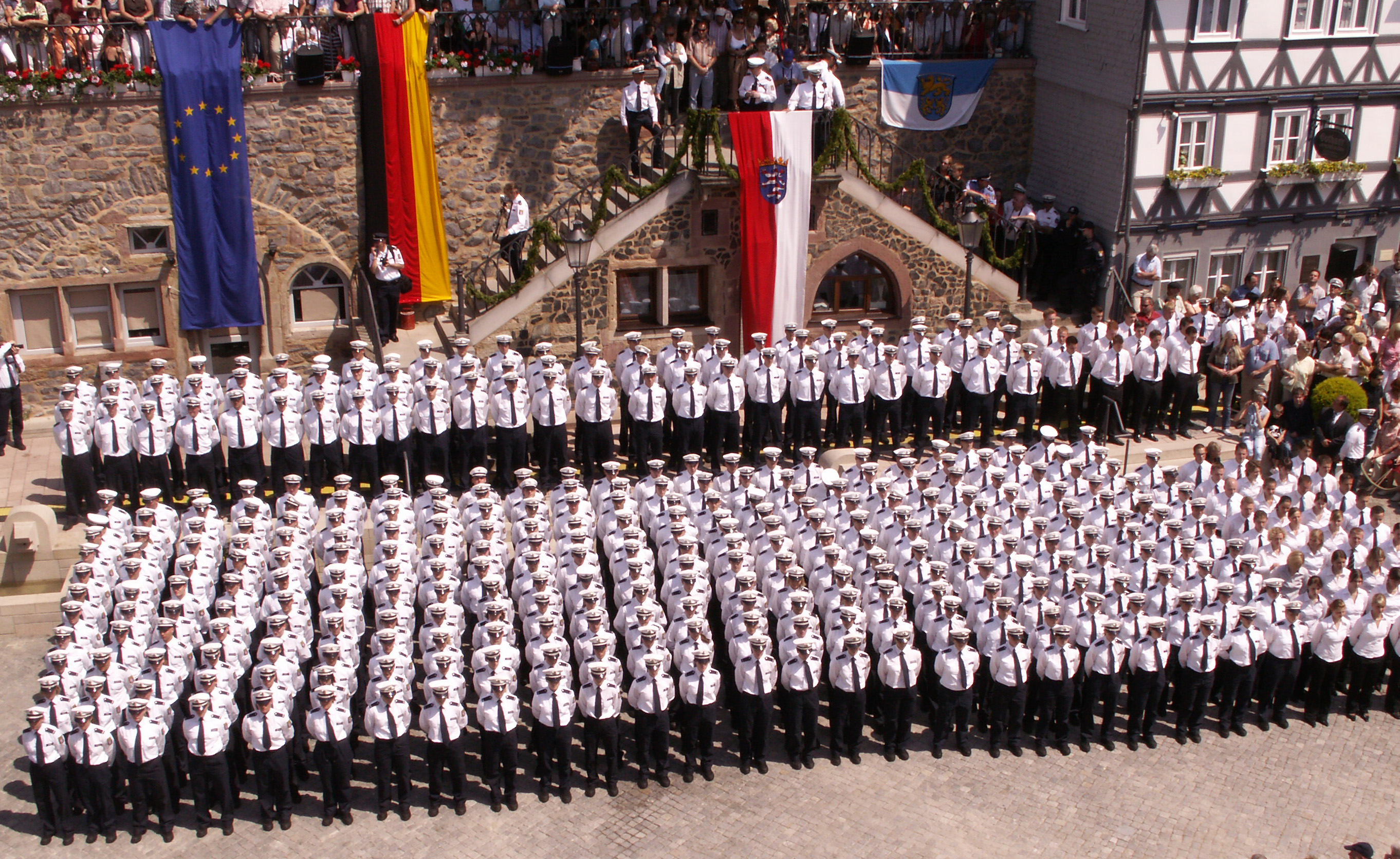
Homberg (Efze), 2008

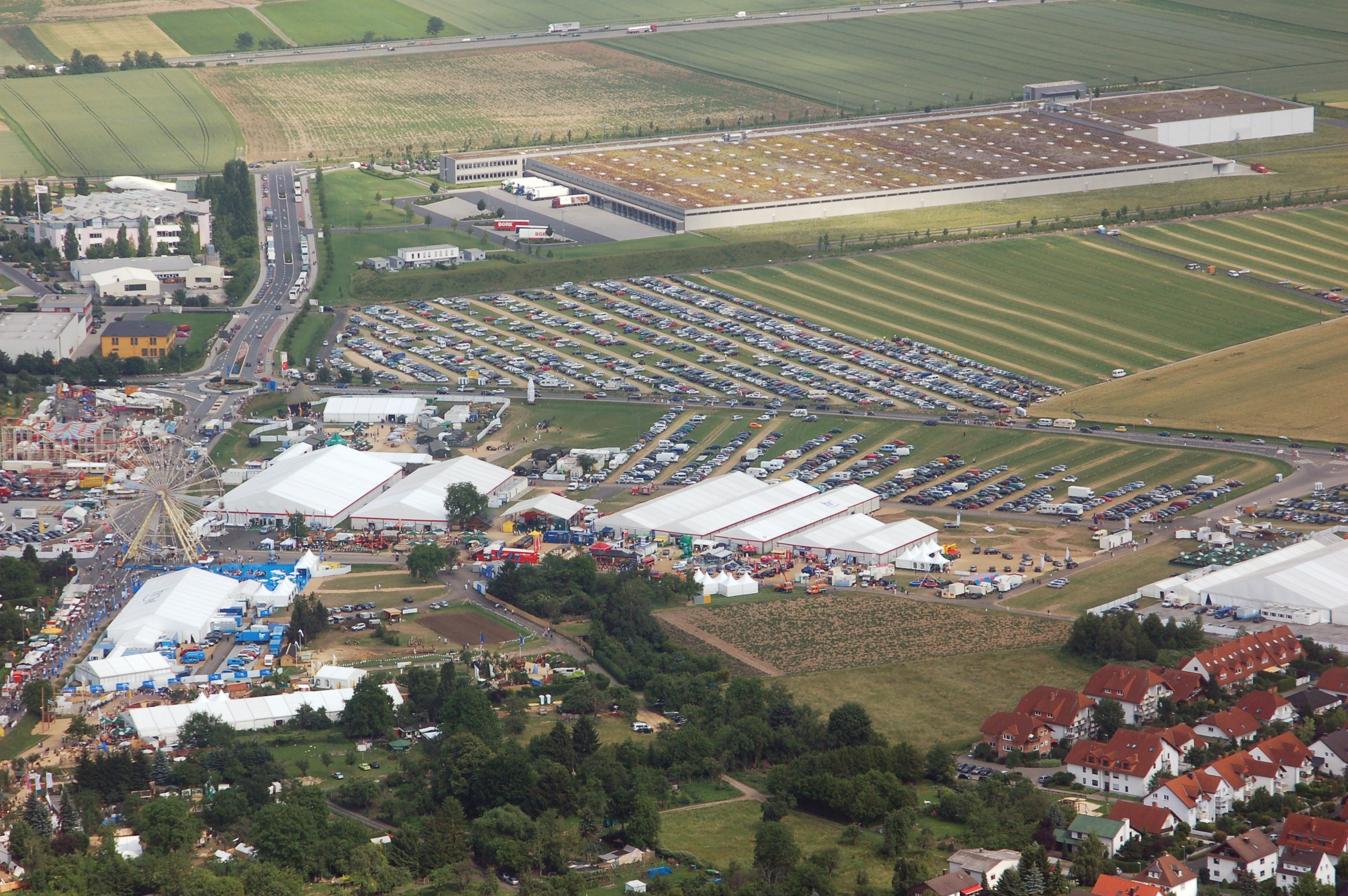
Butzbach, 2007

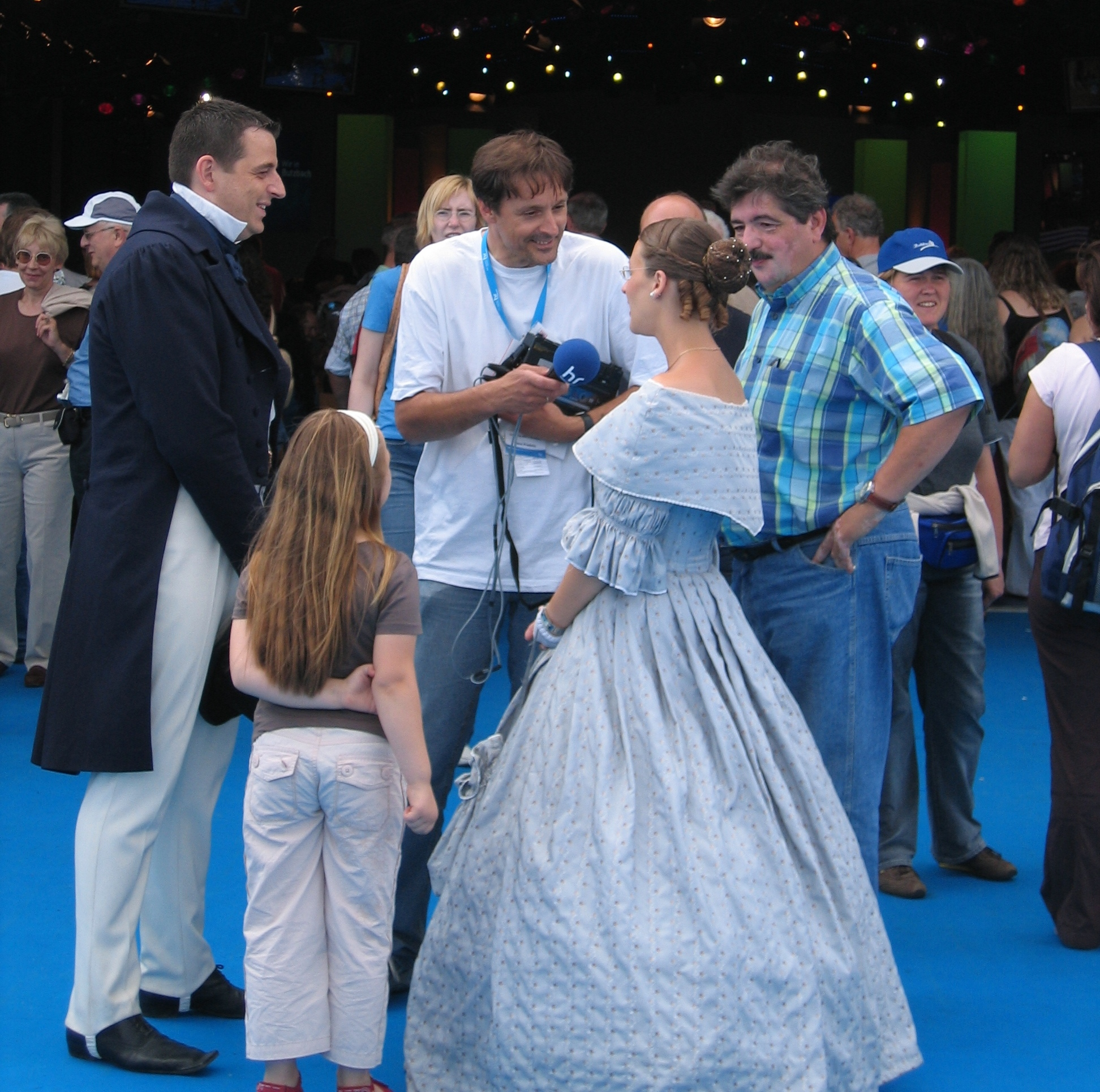
Hessentagspaar 2007

The Hessentag (German pronunciation: [ˈhɛsn̩taːk]; English: Hesse Day) is an annual event, both fair and festival, organized by the German state of Hesse to represent the different regions of Hesse. The events are shown for a week to the visitors, with an emphasis on cultural displays and exhibitions. It is the oldest and largest state festival (Landesfest) in Germany.

== History ==
The Hessentag was launched in 1961 by the minister-president of Hesse, Georg August Zinn. The event was intended to bring together long-time residents and migrants and to provide a sense of their new home to the many refugees and displaced persons. Hesse itself had to catch up in terms of togetherness; the state was only created in 1945 by a decision of the victorious powers of World War II, from areas with different history and development. Georg August Zinn knew how to integrate the various new "Hessians", following his motto: "Hesse ist, wer Hesse sein will" (A Hessian is anybody who wants to be a Hessian").

The first Hessentag in Alsfeld in 1961 was held on three days, presenting a fair and a parade of the different traditional costumes in Hesse. It attracted 40,000 visitors. Because of this success, an annual event was held. The Hessentag is hosted by a different town each year. The event comes with publicity, improved infrastructure and restoration of historic buildings, but is expensive for the host town.

Hessentag has undergone many changes. Originally it was held on one weekend (three days), but grew to a 9- or 10-day event, including both weekends. It connects Hessian culture, tradition and modern lifestyle. The first focus of the event was presentation of traditions, especially the wide variety of costumes in Hesse and also the costumes of the new citizens who came after 1945. Concerts by international pop groups have become a featured part of the program. The Landesausstellung (State Exhibition) is shown in mobile halls, presenting the state government, the parliament, parliamentary groups, various state agencies and organizations, associations and clubs. Regions of Hesse are presented mostly from a tourist's point of view. Since 1971, for each Hessentag a couple (Hessentagspaar) is elected to represent it. Since 1993, a motto for the event was chosen by the hosting town, also a logo. The event is traditionally closed by a parade.

Each year the event has attracted more than half a million visitors, not only from Hesse. More than one million visitors were counted first in Baunatal in 1999, the leader so far was Kassel, with nearly 1.9 million visitors in 2013. Other towns attracting more than one million visitors were Dietzenbach (2001), Butzbach (2007), Langenselbold (2009), Stadtallendorf (2010) and Oberursel (2011). The Hessentag 2012 was held in Wetzlar and attracted 1.2 million visitors.

In 2020, the scheduled Hessentag in Bad Vilbel was cancelled for the first time due to the COVID-19 pandemic. The 2021 Hessentag, scheduled to be held in Fulda, was also cancelled, as was the 2022 edition, scheduled to be held in Haiger.

== Locations ==
No.	Year	Location	Visitors	Days
1	1961	Alsfeld	40,000	3
2	1962	Michelstadt	40,000	3
3	1963	Hanau	60,000	3
4	1964	Kassel	430,000	3
5	1965	Darmstadt	350,000	5
6	1966	Friedberg	120,000	3
7	1967	Bad Hersfeld	150,000	3
8	1968	Viernheim	150,000	3
9	1969	Gießen	200,000	3
10	1970	Wiesbaden	200,000	3
11	1971	Eschwege	160,000	3
12	1972	Marburg	250,000	9
13	1973	Pfungstadt	160,000	9
14	1974	Fritzlar	230,000	9
15	1975	Wetzlar	370,000	9
16	1976	Bensheim	345,000	9
17	1977	Dreieich	450,000	9
18	1978	Hofgeismar	300,000	9
19	1979	Friedberg	350,000	9
20	1980	Grünberg	275,000	9
21	1981	Bürstadt	300,000	9
22	1982	Wächtersbach	300,000	8
23	1983	Lauterbach	300,000	9
24	1984	Lampertheim	400,000	9
25	1985	Alsfeld	400,000	9
26	1986	Herborn	350,000	9
27	1987	Melsungen	400,000	9
28	1988	Hofheim	450,000	6
29	1989	Frankenberg	480,000	9
30	1990	Fulda	700,000	10
31	1991	Lorsch	580,000	10
32	1992	Wolfhagen	680,000	10
33	1993	Lich	860,000	10
34	1994	Groß-Gerau	680,000	10
35	1995	Schwalmstadt	760,000	10
36	1996	Gelnhausen	660,000	10
37	1997	Korbach	700,000	10
38	1998	Erbach	520,000	10
39	1999	Baunatal	1,060,000	10
40	2000	Hünfeld	710,000	10
41	2001	Dietzenbach	1,100,000	10
42	2002	Idstein	925,000	10
43	2003	Bad Arolsen	780,000	10
44	2004	Heppenheim	915,000	10
45	2005	Weilburg	840,000	10
46	2006	Hessisch Lichtenau	580,000	10
47	2007	Butzbach	1,100,000	10
48	2008	Homberg (Efze)	810,000	10
49	2009	Langenselbold	1,000,000	10
50	2010	Stadtallendorf	1,100,000	10
51	2011	Oberursel (Taunus)	1,400,000	10
52	2012	Wetzlar	1,215,000	10
53	2013	Kassel	1,830,000	10
54	2014	Bensheim	1,325,000	10
55	2015	Hofgeismar	750,000	10
56	2016	Herborn	940,000	10
57	2017	Rüsselsheim	1,400,000	10
58	2018	Korbach	845,000	10
59	2019	Bad Hersfeld	862,000	10
60	2023	Pfungstadt	400,000	10
61	2024	Fritzlar	519,000	10

=== Planned locations ===
No.	Year	Location
	2020	Bad Vilbel - cancelled due to COVID-19 pandemic
	2021	Fulda - cancelled due to COVID-19 pandemic
	2022	Haiger - cancelled due to COVID-19 pandemic
62	2025	Bad Vilbel
