= Bürstadt =

- Town
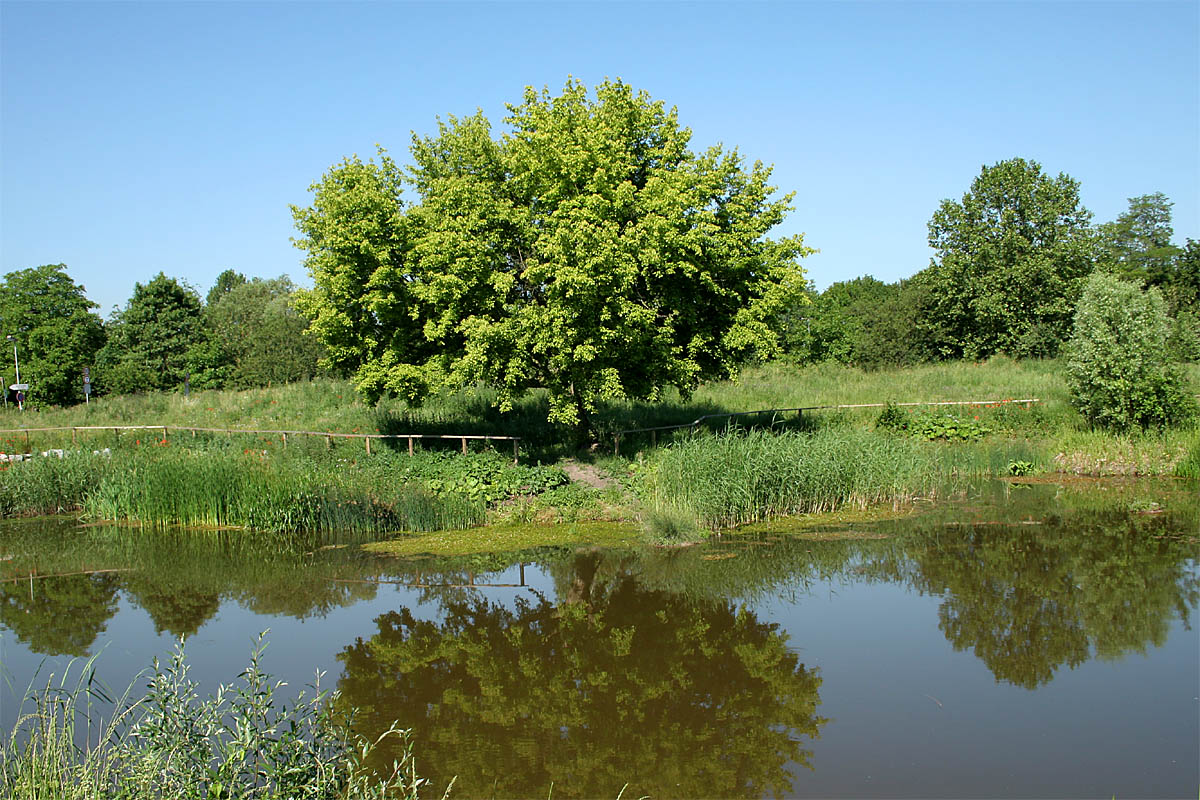

- Coat of arms

- Location of Bürstadt within Bergstraße district
- Interactive map of Bürstadt
- Location within Germany Location within Hesse
- Coordinates: 49°38′N 8°27′E
- Country: Germany
- State: Hesse
- Admin. region: Darmstadt
- District: Bergstraße
- Subdivisions: 3

Government
  - Mayor (2019–25): Barbara Schader (CDU)

Area
  - Total: 34.46 km^{2} (13.31 sq mi)
- Elevation: 90 m (300 ft)

Population (2025-12-31)
  - Total: 17,721
  - Density: 514.2/km^{2} (1,332/sq mi)
- Time zone: UTC+01:00 (CET)
  - Summer (DST): UTC+02:00 (CEST)
- Postal codes: 68642
- Dialling codes: 06206, 06245 (Bobstadt)
- Vehicle registration: HP
- Website: www.buerstadt.de

Bürstadt (German pronunciation: [ˈbyːɐ̯ˌʃtat]) is a town in the Bergstraße district in southern Hesse, Germany, 7 km east of Worms, and 17 km north of Mannheim. In 1981, the town hosted the 21st Hessentag state festival.

== Geography ==
=== Location ===
Bürstadt lies in the Rhine rift between the Rhine and the Odenwald, and thereby in the Hessisches Ried.

=== Neighbouring communities ===
Bürstadt borders in the north on the community of Biblis, in the northeast on the community of Einhausen, in the east on the town of Lorsch, and in the south and west on the town of Lampertheim.

=== Constituent communities ===
Bürstadt's Ortsteile are Bobstadt, Bürstadt and Riedrode. Each of the two outlying centres lies roughly one kilometre from Bürstadt.

== History ==
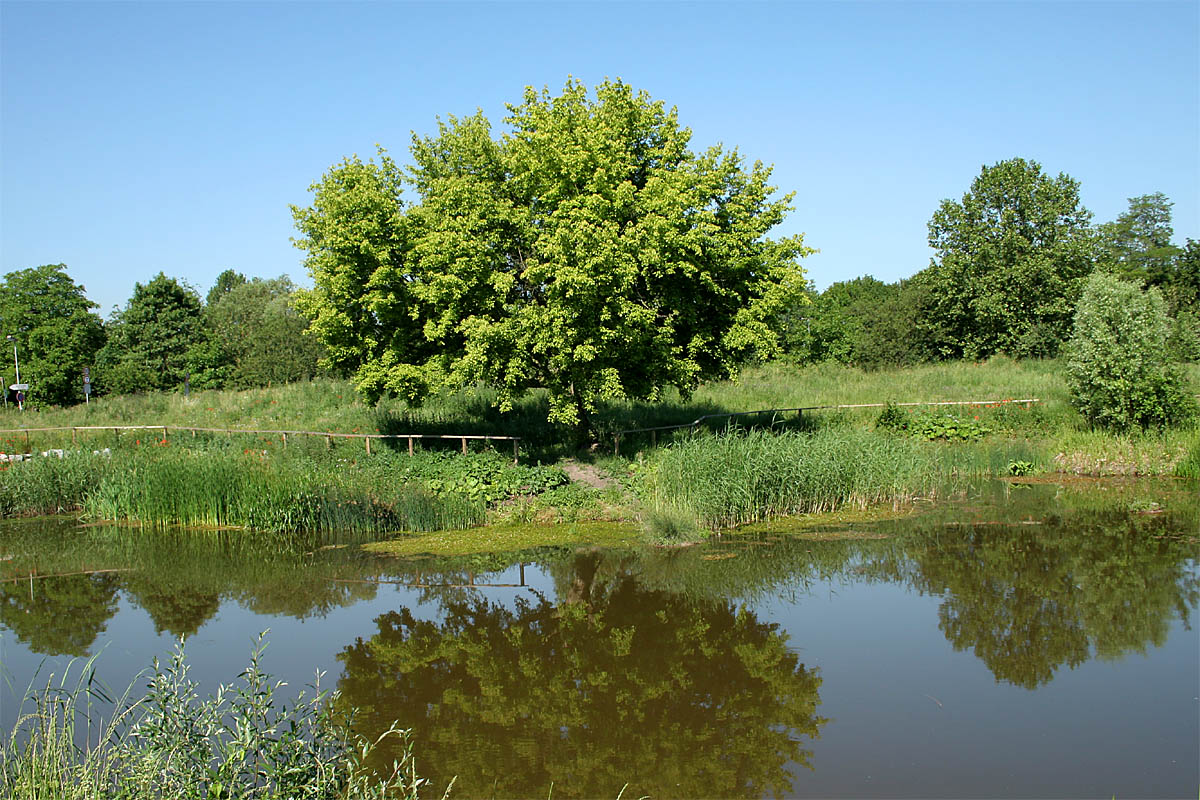
Naturoase Lachgärten, Bürstadt

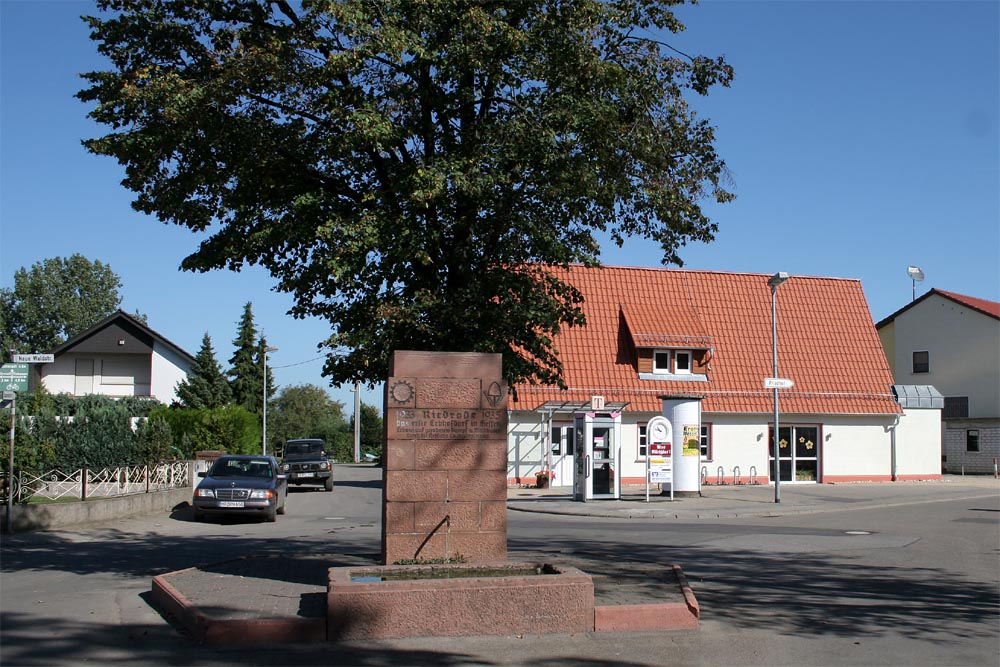
Riedrode Village Square

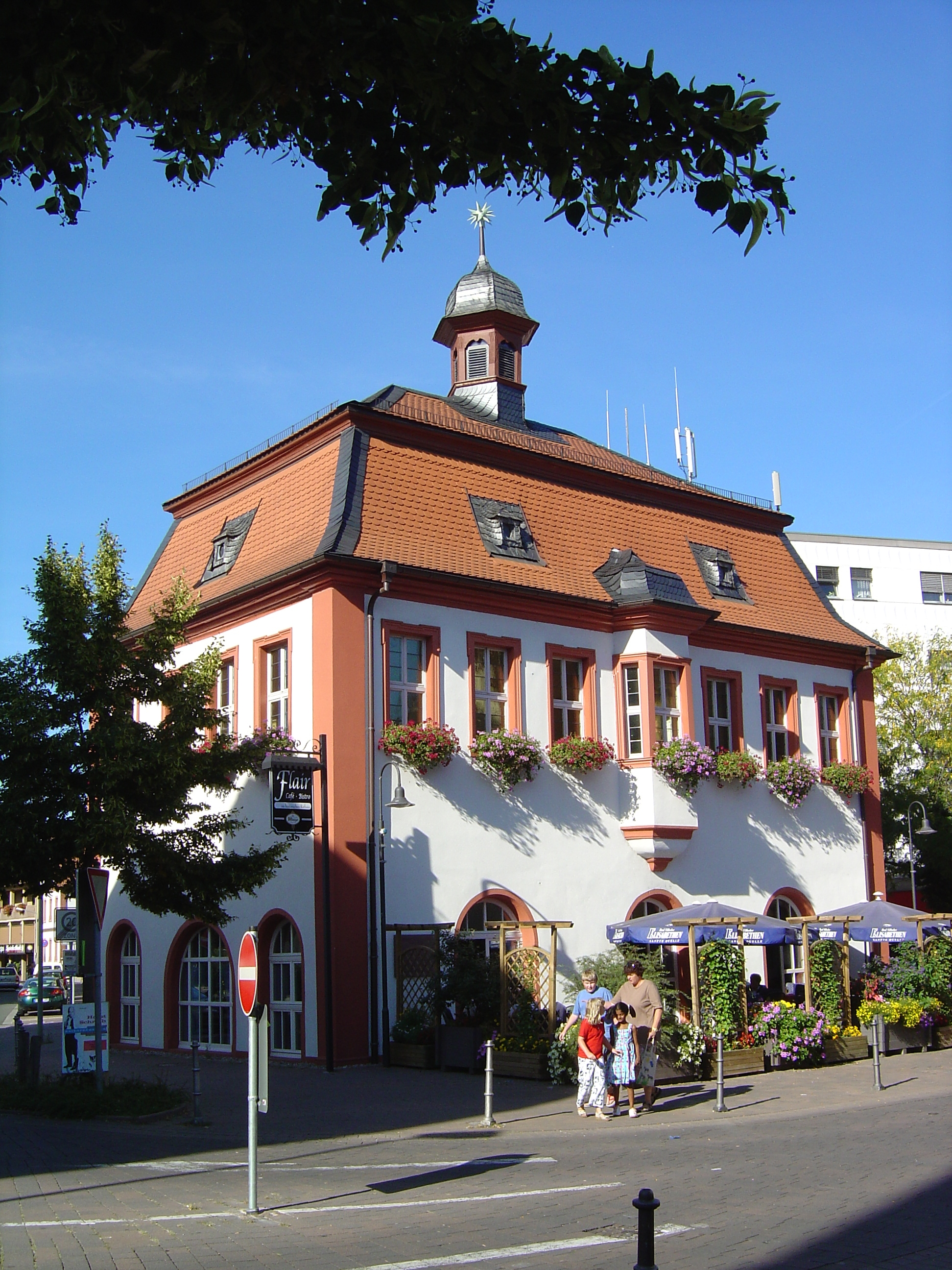
Historic Town Hall in Bürstadt

The name Bürstadt comes from Bisos Stätte (“Biso’s Stead”). Biso was a Frankish prince who had holdings in the area.

Bürstadt lies in one of the most culture- and history-laden of Germany's old domains. Conditioned by the Rhine rift's fertile soil and wealth in wildlife and biodiversity, the Rhine's upper bank was already settled very early on.

A 1.35 m-high monolith that stands in Bürstadt's municipal area, the so-called Sackstein (49°39′19″N 8°26′4″E), is probably a menhir from the late New Stone Age. Barrows in the Bürstadt woods have yielded some finds that can be dated to Hallstatt times. Also worthy of note are a number of finds from early La Tène times, for example a beaker shaped by hand with finger impressions dating from about 500 BC. Moreover, remains of an extensive Roman settlement can be found on the edge of the Bürstadt woods. For the traveller, Bürstadt, where there was once a Carolingian royal court, lay halfway between the Nibelungenstadt (city connected with the Nibelungenlied) of Worms, founded by Celts, and the former Lorsch Abbey.

This abbey was founded in 764 in nearby Lorsch by Count Kankor, and from the 9th to 12th centuries it was among Germany's biggest Benedictine abbeys. On 1 November 767, Bürstadt had its first documentary mention in a donation document. In 776, Eufemia, Count Kankor's daughter, donated her holdings in Villa et marca Babestat to the Lorsch Abbey. Her brother Heimerich, too, bequeathed his property in Bobstadt to the Abbey in 782, thus giving Bobstadt its first documentary mention.

In 789 came the Boxheimerhof's first documentary mention. This was a Lorsch monastic estate, and it appeared under the name Villa wizzilin or Wizzelai. By 1275, it already bore the name Boxheim.

In late April 873, at Whitsun, King Louis the German held his Imperial Assembly (placitum) in Bürstadt. There were negotiations with Danish King Siegfried's legation and a reception for Great Moravian Prince Svatopluk’s envoy. Furthermore, it was here that Louis reconciled with his sons.

In 1232, Bürstadt passed, along with the Lorsch Imperial Abbey to the Archbishopric of Mainz. In 1427, Bürstadt was enfeoffed to the Lords of Wattenheim, but with Peter von Wattenheim’s death in 1440, the holdings passed back to the monastery at Worms. In 1443, Bishop Johann of Worms gave the village and court of Bürstadt to Konrad von Frankenstein, who was the first feudal lord from the Frankenstein noble family in the Amt zum Stein in a line that was to last until 1780.

In 1461, Bürstadt was pledged to the Electorate of the Palatinate. In 1556, the Elector of Palatinate introduced the Reformation into Bürstadt, along with other places.

In the Thirty Years' War (1618–1648), all houses in Bürstadt were burnt down. For almost ten years, the village had no inhabitants. In 1618 it had roughly 700 people, and by the war’s end, only 154. In 1623, Bürstadt passed back to the Archbishopric of Mainz, and Catholicism was thereby reintroduced. In 1732, building work began on St. Michael’s, a Baroque church.

In 1780, Bürstadt was once again in the Worms Amt of Lampertheim (formerly Amt Stein). With the dissolution of the Electorate of Mainz, Bürstadt passed to the Grand Duchy of Hesse.

On 3 November 1824, the Reuterdeich, a levee on the Rhine near Nordheim, broke, and the floods overwhelmed the Ried (upper part of the Rhine rift). The flooding hit Bobstadt hard.

In May 1882, Peter Itzel, a Catholic priest from St. Michael’s, was stabbed to death by day labourer Fischbach, giving Bürstadt a bad reputation and the nickname Messerstecher (“Knifer”)

On 10 July 1936 came the dedication of the first Erbhofdorf (“Heritage Farming Village”) in Hesse, Riedrode. Twenty-eight families took ownership of 28 farms. This was all in accordance with the National Socialist eichserbhofgesetz, or “Reich Heritage Farming Law” (See: Blood and soil).

In 1967, Bürstadt was granted town rights. In 2005, the world's biggest rooftop photovoltaic system was brought into service in Bürstadt (40 000 m^{2} roof area; 5 MW output). The same year, Bürstadt became the German champion in the Solarbundesliga (category: 10,000-100,000 inhabitants). In 2006, Bürstadt won the gold medal in the Entente Florale contest.

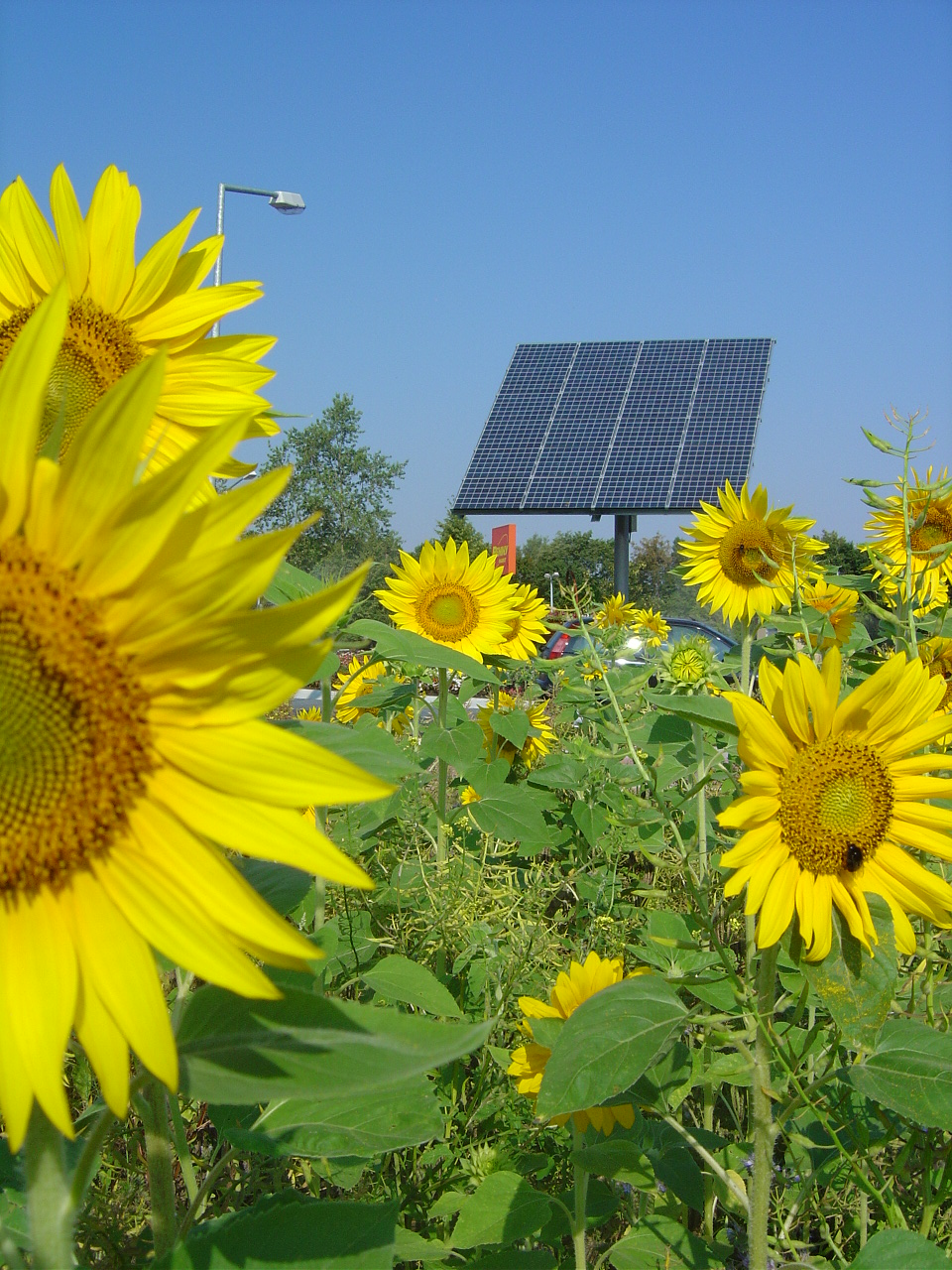
Solar panel in Bürstadt

On 22 February 2007, the foundation was laid for one of Germany's biggest biogas facilities with an output of roughly 2.2 MW, and on 5–7 September 2008, the EnergieTrends+ fair was held for the first time.

=== Amalgamations ===
- Bobstadt
- Riedrode (15 May 1971)

=== Former parts of town ===
- Rosengarten

== Population development ==
- 1806: 1,357
- 1867: 2,765
- 1925: 7,144
- 1988: 15,214
- 2004: 15,308
- 2005: 15,427
- 2006: 15,973
- 2007: 16,095
- 2013: 15,625

== Politics ==
=== Community council ===
The votes and seats won for the 2021 municipal board election were as follows:

Political Faction		2021 vote (%)	2021 seats won
CDU	Christian Democratic Union of Germany	36.78	11
SPD	Social Democratic Party of Germany	18.58	6
Green	Alliance 90/The Greens	14.79	5
FDP	Free Democratic Party	7.80	2
Free voters	Free Voters	22.06	7

The municipal election held on 26 March 2006 yielded the following results:

Parties and voter communities		% 2006	Seats; 2006	% 2001	Seats; 2001
CDU	Christian Democratic Union of Germany	57.7	18	61.6	23
SPD	Social Democratic Party of Germany	31.1	10	38.4	14
FDP	Free Democratic Party	11.2	3	–	–
Total		100.0	31	100.0	37
Voter turnout in %		44.1		56.9	

=== Mayor ===
From 1989 to 2013 Alfons Haag (CDU) was the town's mayor. Since 2013, the mayor has been Barbara Schader (CDU). Barbara Schader was re-elected in 2019 with 52% of the vote.

=== Coat of arms ===
The town's arms might be described thus: Gules a cross pattée fitchy argent, the chief bendy lozengy argent and azure.

The Lorsch cross fitchy (that is, with a point on the bottom arm) recalls the time from 767 to 1262 when the town was one of the Abbey's holdings. In 1461, Bürstadt was pledged to the Electorate of the Palatinate, hence the chief with the bendy lozengy (that is, made up of slanted diamonds of alternating tinctures) pattern. In 1632, the town passed back to the Electorate of Mainz, and in 1803 belonged to the Grand Duchy of Hesse, hence the red field behind the cross.

Bürstadt received the right to bear these arms when it was also granted town rights in 1967.

=== Town partnerships ===
- Krieglach, Styria, Austria, since 1974
- Wittelsheim, Haut-Rhin, France, since 1982
- Minano, Saitama, Japan (“friendship agreement”), since 1984
- (Germany) Glauchau, Saxony, since 1991

== Transport and infrastructure ==
Bürstadt lies in the north of the Rhine Neckar Area on Bundesstraßen 47 and 44. Autobahn A 67 can be reached using the Lorsch interchange, about 5 km or 3 miles from town.

Bürstadt railway station lies at the junction of the Mannheim–Frankfurt railway and Nibelung Railway (Mannheim-Frankfurt am Main and Worms-Bensheim), giving the station services in all four cardinal compass directions.

Frankfurt Airport is roughly 60 km or 36 miles from town.

=== Leisure facilities ===
- Solar-heated outdoor swimming pool
- Athletics facility with 6-lane Tartan track
- VfR Bürstadt Football stadium with a 500-seat grandstand
- Artificial turf sporting ground in Riedrode
- Jugendhaus Schillers (“Youth House”)

== Economy ==
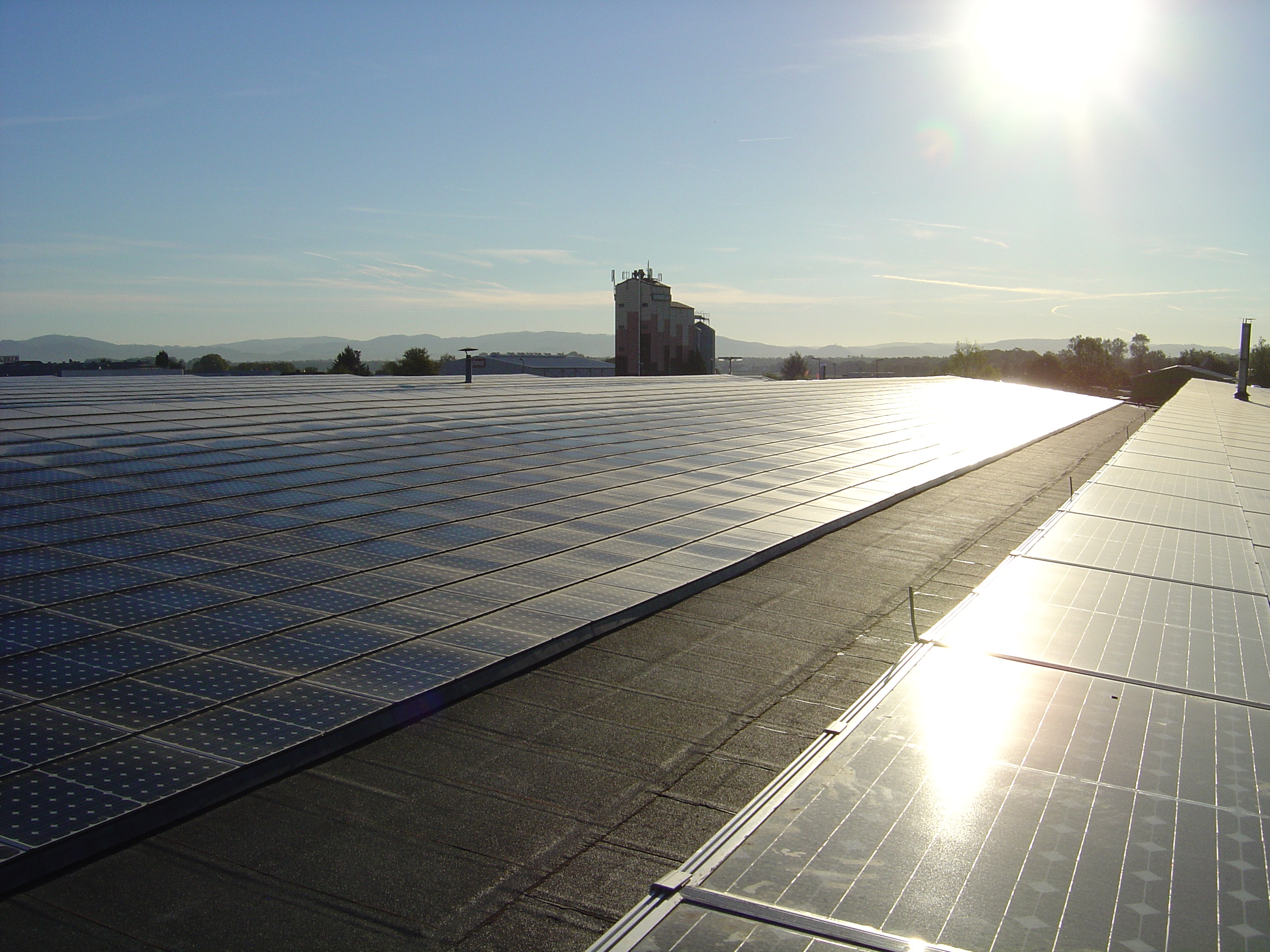
View of the world's biggest rooftop photovoltaic system (5 MW) on the roof of TTS-Spedition

Bürstadt has been since 2004 the location of the world's biggest rooftop photovoltaic system (5 MW from 40 000 m^{2} roof area), built on a local logistics business's roof.

Furthermore, Bürstadt is also the location of a 380 kV transmission substation run by RWE AG, which was brought into service as one of the first such facilities of this capacity in Germany on 4 October 1957 in the course of bringing Germany's first 380 kV transmission line (Rommerskirchen-Bürstadt-Hoheneck) into service.

== Famous people ==
=== Sons and daughters of the town ===
- Ilona Dörr (born 1948), politician
- Ingrid Schmidt (born 1955), President of the Federal Labour Court

=== People connected with Bürstadt ===
- Mandy Capristo (born 1990 in Mannheim), singer in the band Monrose, lives in Bürstadt
