= Lorsch =

- Town
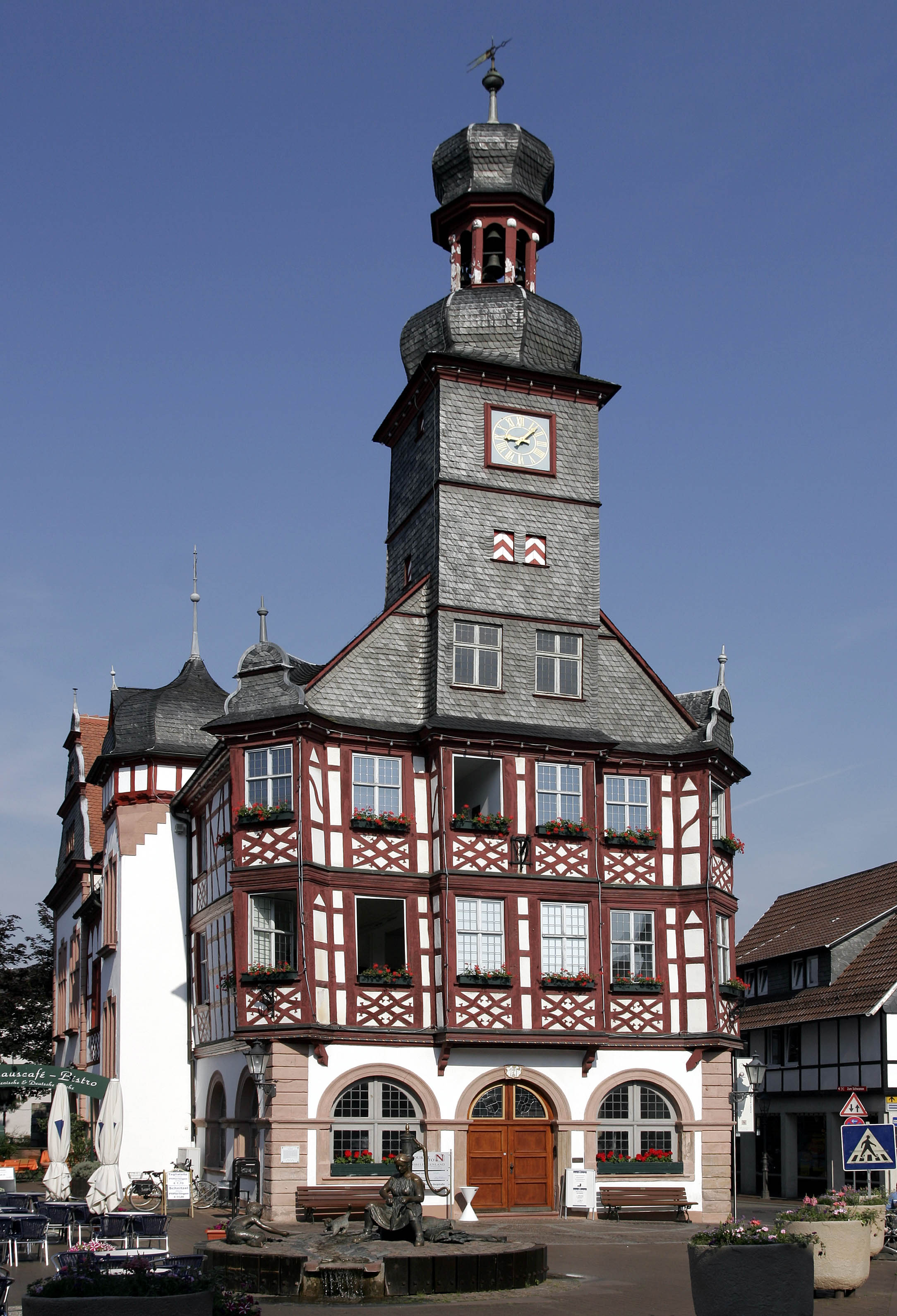
- Town hall

- Coat of arms

- Location of Lorsch within Bergstraße district
- Interactive map of Lorsch
- Location within Germany Location within Hesse
- Coordinates: 49°39′14″N 8°34′3″E
- Country: Germany
- State: Hesse
- Admin. region: Darmstadt
- District: Bergstraße

Government
  - Mayor (2022–28): Christian Schönung (CDU)

Area
  - Total: 25.24 km^{2} (9.75 sq mi)
- Elevation: 93 m (305 ft)

Population (2025-12-31)
  - Total: 14,235
  - Density: 564.0/km^{2} (1,461/sq mi)
- Time zone: UTC+01:00 (CET)
  - Summer (DST): UTC+02:00 (CEST)
- Postal codes: 64653
- Dialling codes: 06251
- Vehicle registration: HP
- Website: lorsch.de

Lorsch (German pronunciation: [lɔʁʃ]) is a town in the Bergstraße district in Hessen, Germany, 60 km south of Frankfurt. Lorsch is well known for the Lorsch Abbey, which has been named a World Heritage Site by UNESCO.

== Geography ==
=== Location ===
Lorsch lies about 5 km west of the Bergstraße in the Rhine rift just west of the Odenwald between Darmstadt to the north and Mannheim to the south. The town lies not far from the Weschnitz's lower reaches. To the town's southeast the Weschnitzinsel conservation area is located.

=== Neighbouring communities ===
Lorsch borders in the north on the community of Einhausen and the town of Bensheim, in the east on the town of Heppenheim, in the southeast on the community of Laudenbach and the town of Hemsbach (both in Rhein-Neckar-Kreis, Baden-Württemberg), in the south on the town of Lampertheim and in the west on the town of Bürstadt.

== History ==
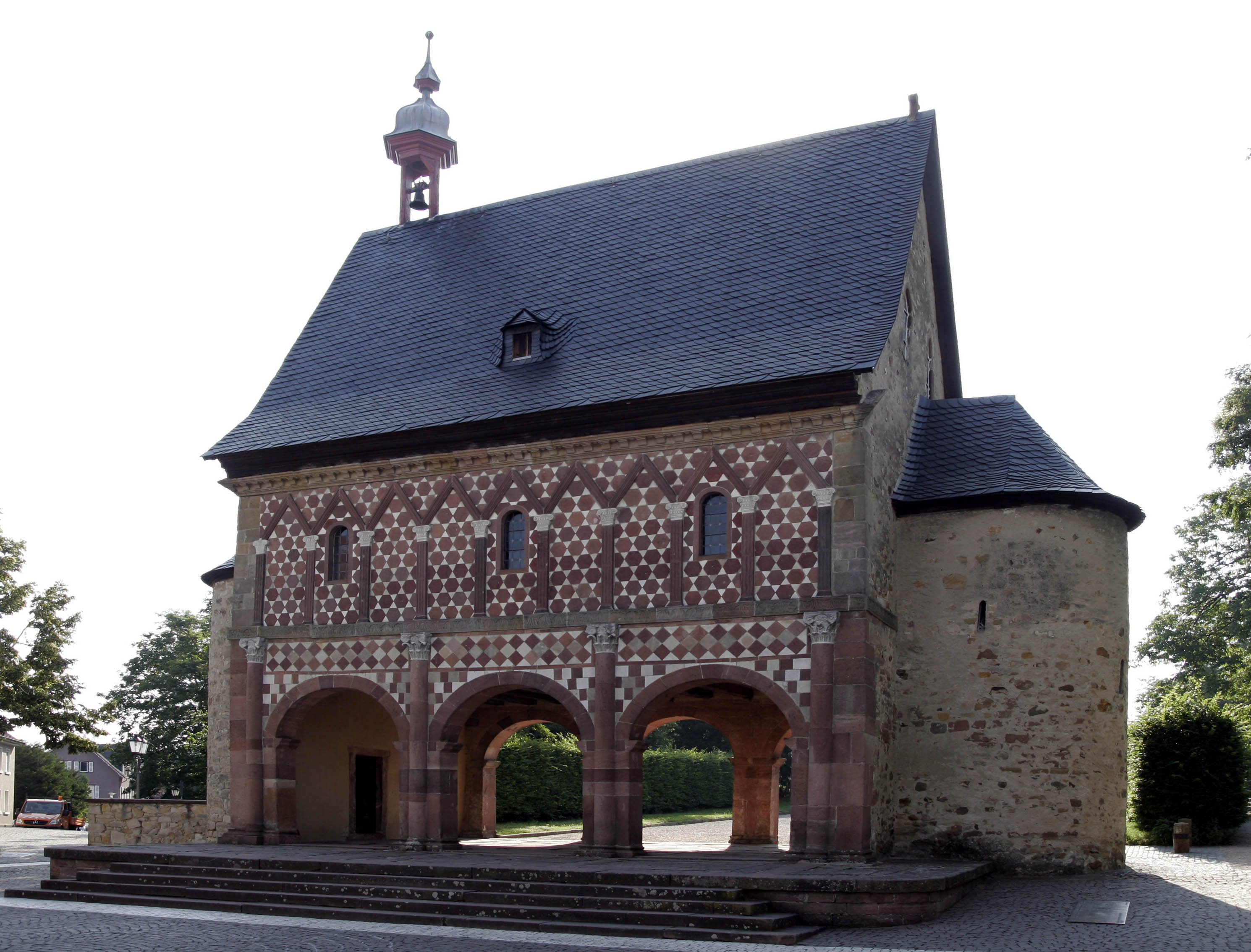
Carolingian gatehall

Lorsch Abbey (German: Kloster Lorsch) was founded in 764 by the Frankish Count Cancor and his mother Williswinda. The abbey was one of the greatest centres of Carolingian art. Several Carolingian kings of Germany were buried there. The monastery was settled by Benedictines from Gorze Abbey near Metz. In a document from 885, the abbey is mentioned as Lauressam, from which, over the course of time, came the town's current name. In the Early and High Middle Ages, the abbey was a powerful Imperial monastery with holdings in the nearby Odenwald, on the Bergstraße and in Rhenish Hesse, and also in Alsace and Lorraine.

In the civil war resulting from the Investiture Controversy in the 11th century, the abbey sustained great losses in holdings to the nobility.

In the late 12th century, with the record of the old deeds, there was an attempt to reorganize the administration (Lorsch codex). Nevertheless, in 1232, Lorsch was awarded to the Archbishopric of Mainz and newly settled by Premonstratensians. Thereafter, Mainz and the Electorate of the Palatinate found themselves at odds over who should hold the vogt rights. Of the Carolingian Benedictine abbey, which in parts has been unearthed, the gatehall (from about 800) has been preserved. It is today a UNESCO-protected World Heritage Site.

In 1991, the town hosted the 31st Hessentag state festival.

== Economy ==
The firm TrekStor GmbH & Co.KG was founded in 2001 in Lorsch and has its head office here.

== Government ==
=== Community council ===
The municipal held an election on 26 March 2006 and yielded the following results:

Parties and voter communities		% 2006	Seats; 2006	% 2001	Seats; 2001
CDU	Christian Democratic Union of Germany	44.4	16	43.1	16
SPD	Social Democratic Party of Germany	23.8	9	31.1	11
GREENS	Bündnis 90/Die Grünen	12.4	5	9.6	4
FDP	Free Democratic Party	4.7	2	1.6	1
PWL	Parteilose Wählerschaft Lorsch	14.7	5	14.7	5
Total		100.0	37	100.0	37
Voter turnout in %		44.6		50.9	

The town executive (Magistrat) is made up of nine city councillors plus the mayor, and a total of 37 representatives.

There are three committees of the City Council: the Main and Finance Committee (Haupt- und Finanzausschuss), the Building and Environmental Committee (Bau- und Umweltausschuss), and the Cultural and Social Committee (Kultur- und Sozialausschuss).

As of January 2021, the City Council's chairwoman is Christiane Ludwig-Paul.

=== Mayor ===
From 1993 to 2011, the mayor was Klaus Jäger (independent). He was re-elected on 7 February 1999 with 85.2% of the vote, and again on 13 February 2005 with 70.6%. Since 2011 the mayor has been Christian Schönung (CDU).

=== Coat of arms ===
Lorsch's arms might be described thus: Party per fess, above sable the King's Hall Or, below party per pale, argent a cross pattée fitchy gules and azure the Lion of Hesse springing.

The King's Hall (Königshalle), the building declared a UNESCO World Heritage Site in 1991, is borne as a charge in the town's arms. The red cross pattée fitchy (that is, cross with “flattened” ends to three of the arms, and a point on the bottom one) is the coat of arms formerly borne by the Lorsch Abbey in its heyday. The Lion of Hesse, shown here springing (with both hindfeet on the ground) rather than rampant (with only one hindfoot on the ground), comes from Hesse's coat of arms (in which he is rampant) and symbolizes Lorsch's status as part of Hesse.

=== Town twinning ===
- Le Coteau, Loire, France since 1988
- Zwevegem, West Flanders, Belgium since 1973
- (Germany) Thal, an outlying centre of Ruhla, Thuringia since 1990

There is also a friendship arrangement with:

- Šternberk, Olomouc Region, Czech Republic.

This came about through the sponsorship arrangement for those ethnic Germans driven out of the communities of Jívová (formerly Giebau), Pohorsch, Weska and Hraničné Petrovice (Petersdorf bei Giebau), who then settled in Lorsch.

== Arts and culture ==
=== Museums ===
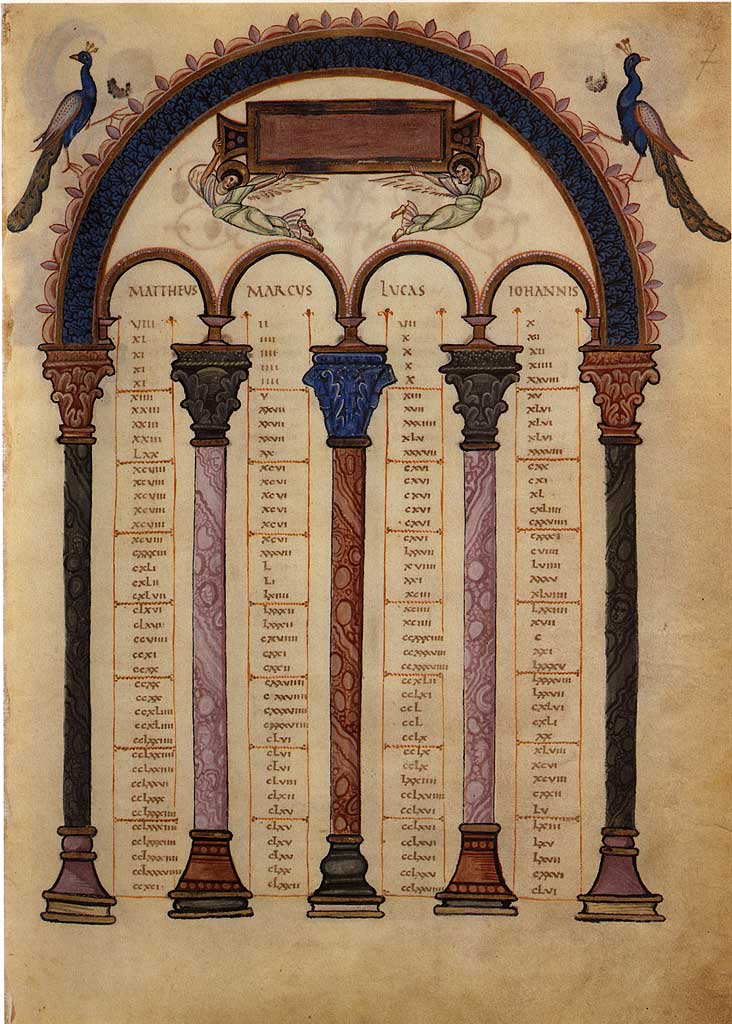
Codex Aureus

- Museumszentrum Lorsch ("Lorsch Museum Centre") with its departments of monastic history and folklore, and its tobacco museum.
- Freilichtlabor Lauresham - open air museum, opened 2014/5

=== Theatre ===
- Kleinkunstbühne Sapperlot (cabaret)
- Musiktheater Rex

=== Regular events ===
In Lorsch on Tuesday during Carnival – locally known as Fastnacht – there is a Carnival parade with more than 100 attractions.

=== Historic buildings ===
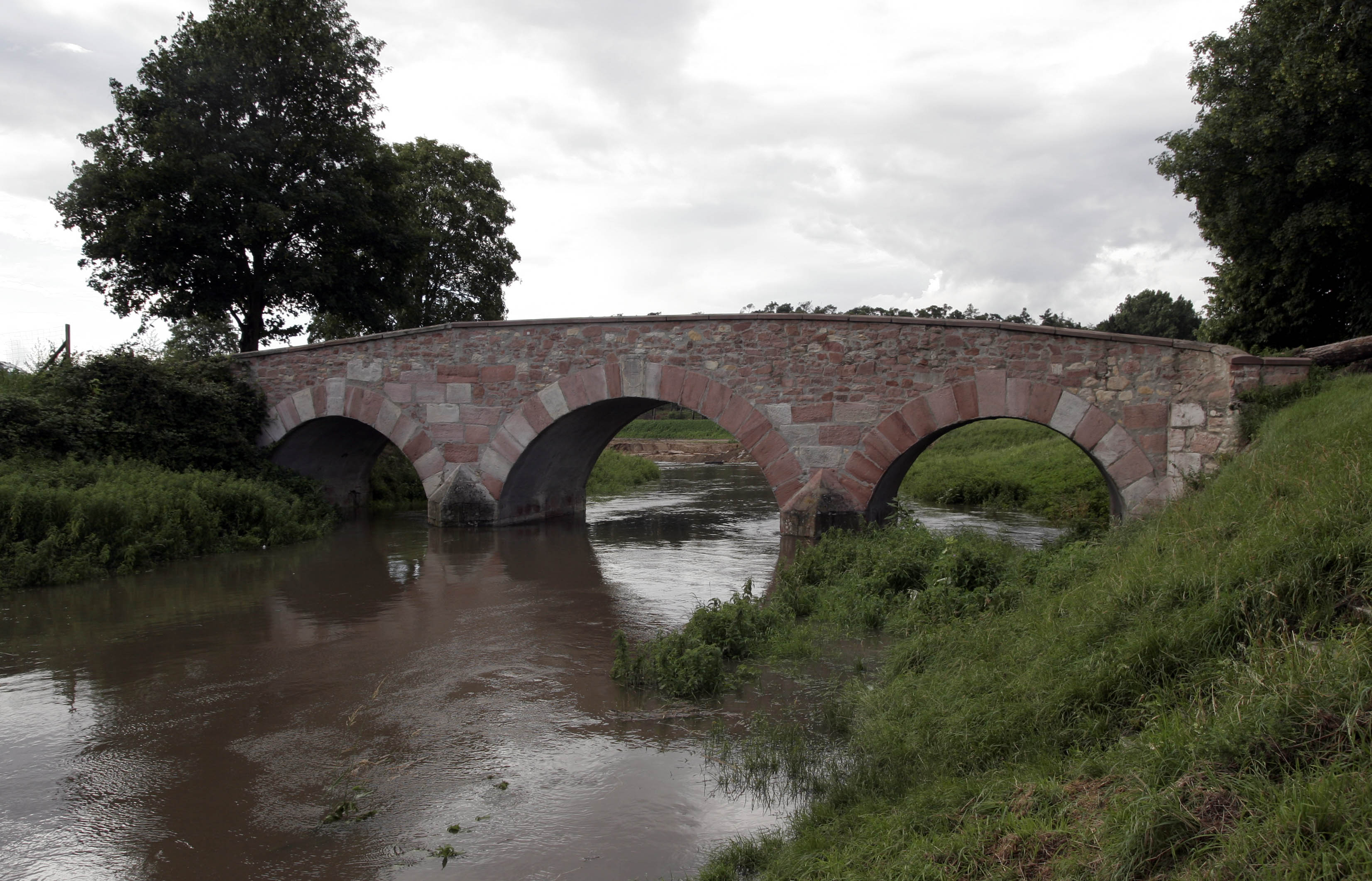
Wattenheimer Brücke

- Lorsch Abbey with the Königshalle
- Benedictine herb gardens at Lorsch Abbey
- Lorsch's town hall (built between 1714 and 1715) - current location of the Tourist Information and the Adult Education Center
- Lorsch's oldest timber-frame house at Stiftstraße 19
- Lorsch's oldest guesthouse, the Weißes Kreuz
- Wattenheimer Brücke (bridge)

== Infrastructure ==
=== Transport ===
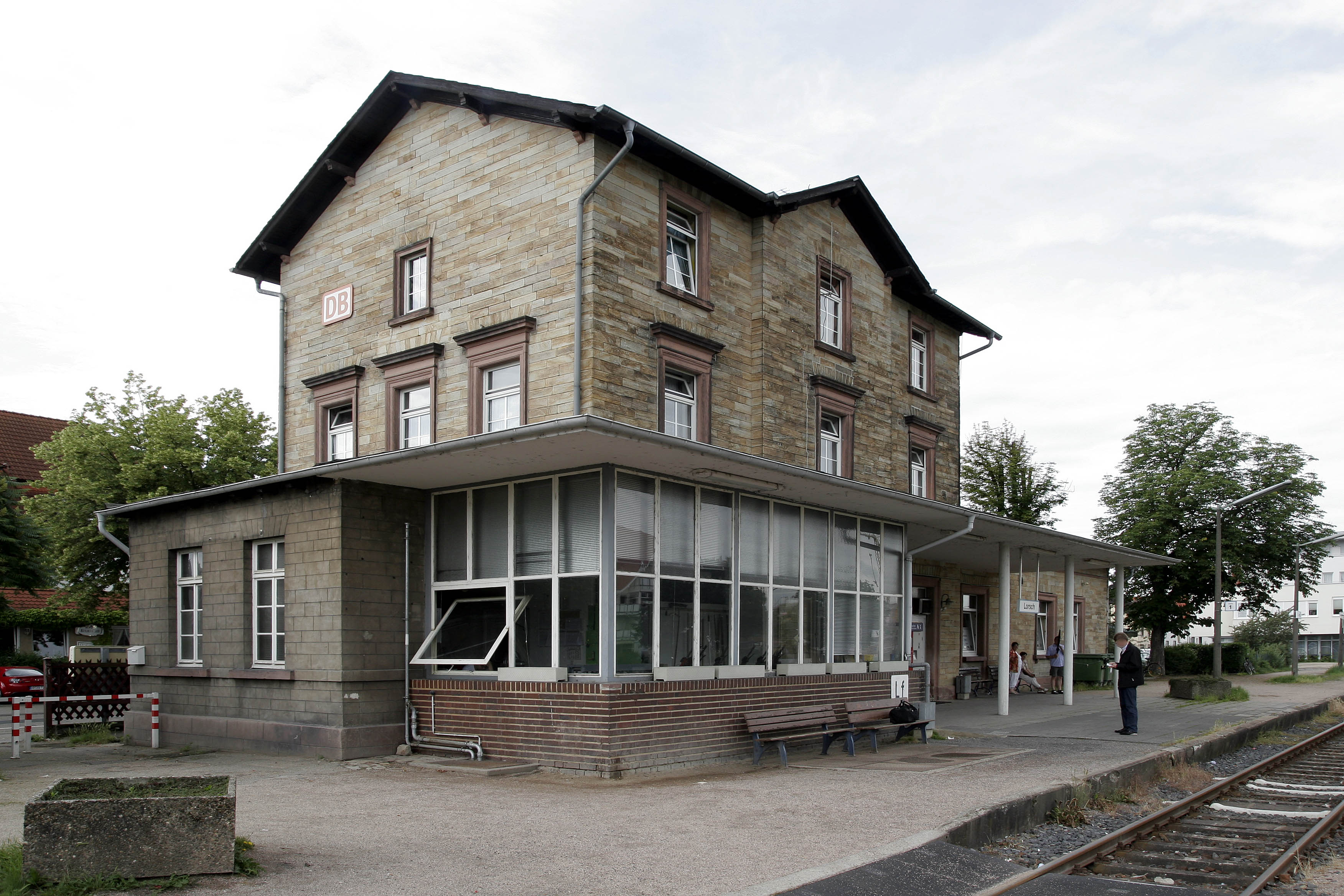
Lorsch railway station in May 2007 (trackside)

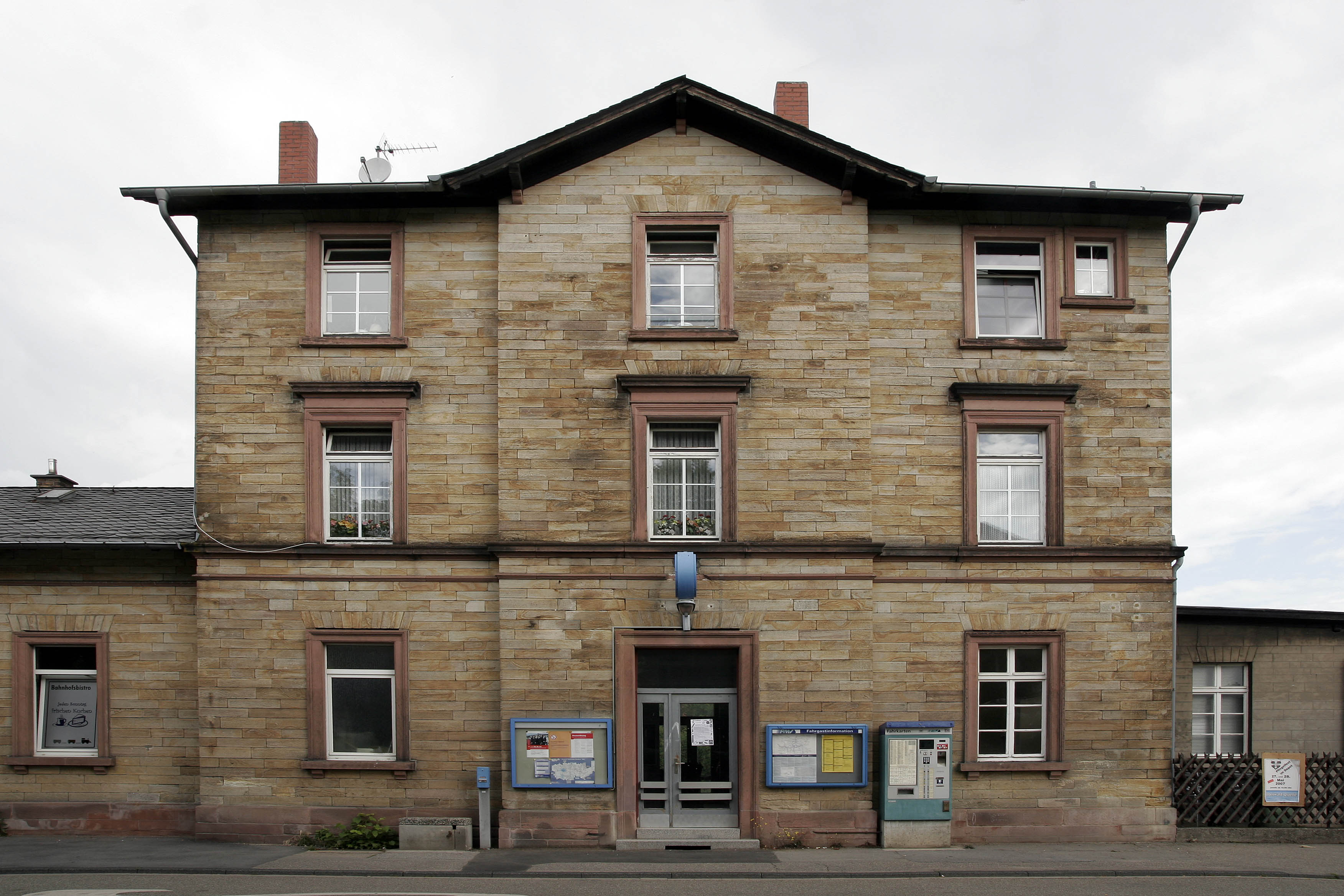
Lorsch railway station in May 2007 (street)

Through the town's municipal area run Autobahn A 67 and Bundesstraßen 47 and 460.

Lorsch's DB railway station lies on the Nibelungenbahn (railway) between Bensheim and Worms. Furthermore, there are bus connections with Lampertheim/Bürstadt, Heppenheim, Einhausen and Bensheim.

Lorsch lies on Hesse's cycle path R9, which leads from Worms by way of Bensheim to Höchst im Odenwald.

=== Public institutions ===
- Geo-Naturpark Bergstraße-Odenwald
- Catholic public library
- Waldschwimmbad: The Lorsch "Forest Swimming Pool" was built in the 1970s. The technology was thoroughly overhauled and expanded in 1994 and 1995.

== Media ==
Lorsch has two regional daily newspapers, the Bergsträßer Anzeiger with its regional Lorsch/Einhausen edition, and the smaller circulation Starkenburger Echo.

== Education ==
- Wingertsbergschule – primary school. The Wingertsbergschule lies on a former sand dune in the Rhine rift on the northeastern edge of its feeder area, the town of Lorsch. Right nearby is found the widely known former Lorsch Abbey. The Wingertsbergschule was founded as a Bergstraße district primary school on 9 January 1974. It is a successor to the Karolinger Volksschule, which until 1972 was sponsored by the town of Lorsch. About 540 children nowadays attend the school and are taught by 31 teachers.
- Werner-von-Siemens Schule – Hauptschule-Realschule. The Werner-von-Siemens Schule gets its name from the Berlin inventor Werner von Siemens. After the Hesse Ministry of Education and the Bergstraße district decided to build a new Hauptschule-Realschule in the town's south (Lagerfeld) in 1971, the Werner-von-Siemens Schule was inaugurated. In November 1973, the school administration decided, along with the parents’ advisory committee to bestow the name Werner-von-Siemens Schule upon the school, which was then announced during an official ceremony on 24 June 1974.

== Notable people ==
=== Honorary citizens ===
- Friedrich Behn (b. 14 February 1883 in Neustrelitz; d. 20 August 1970 in Mainz), archaeologist and archaeological monument caretaker, honoured 1965.
- Albert Ohlmeyer (b. 31 October 1905 in Münster, Westphalia; d. 5 December 1998), abbot, honoured 1965.
- Ekkehard Lommel (b. 14 December 1913 in Weilburg; d. 1 October 2006), district administrator (retired), honoured 25 January 2001.

=== Sons and daughters of the town ===
- Michael Meister (born 1961), CDU politician
- Ernst-Dieter Suttheimer, opera singer
