= Groß-Rohrheim =

- Municipality
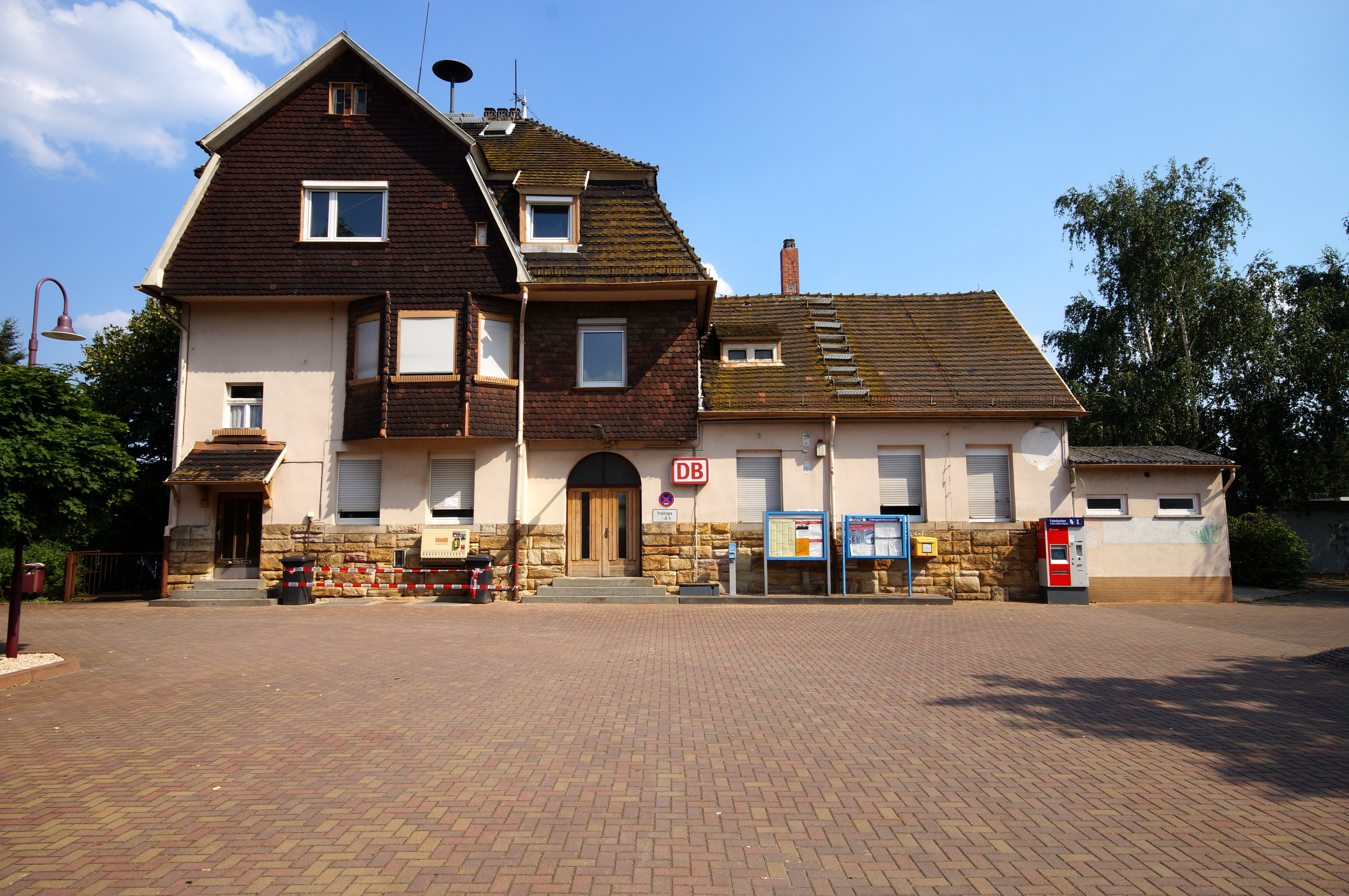
- Train station

- Coat of arms

- Location of Groß-Rohrheim within Bergstraße district
- Interactive map of Groß-Rohrheim
- Location within Germany Location within Hesse
- Coordinates: 49°43′N 8°29′E
- Country: Germany
- State: Hesse
- Admin. region: Darmstadt
- District: Bergstraße

Government
  - Mayor (2023–29): Karsten Krug

Area
  - Total: 19.56 km^{2} (7.55 sq mi)
- Elevation: 90 m (300 ft)

Population (2025-12-31)
  - Total: 3,674
  - Density: 187.8/km^{2} (486.5/sq mi)
- Time zone: UTC+01:00 (CET)
  - Summer (DST): UTC+02:00 (CEST)
- Postal codes: 68649
- Dialling codes: 06245
- Vehicle registration: HP
- Website: www.gross-rohrheim.de

Groß-Rohrheim is a municipality in the Bergstraße district in Hesse, Germany.

== Geography ==
=== Location ===
The community lies 3 km east of the Rhine in the middle of the Hessisches Ried north of Biblis.

=== Neighbouring communities ===
Groß-Rohrheim borders in the north on the town of Gernsheim (Groß-Gerau district), in the east on the community of Einhausen, in the south on the community of Biblis and in the west on the district-free city of Worms (Rhineland-Palatinate) and the community of Hamm am Rhein (Alzey-Worms district in Rhineland-Palatinate).

=== Constituent communities ===
Groß-Rohrheim has two Ortsteile, or quarters, split by the railway right-of-way running between Frankfurt and Mannheim, the older, original centre west of the tracks and a new town development on the east side.

== History ==
In 782, Groß-Rohrheim had its first documentary mention in the Lorsch Codex. Names for the community changed over the centuries from Rohrheim superior to villa Rorheim to Ober Rorheim and then to Groß-Rohrheim, the name it has borne since 1689 (groß means “great” in German). In the Middle Ages, the Lorsch Abbey was the feudal overlord; later it was the Lords of Bickenbach, the Counts of Erbach and the House of Katzenelnbogen or their successors, the Landgraves of Hesse. The Erbach family’s share was sold off as early as 1714 to Hesse-Darmstadt.

The Thirty Years' War and later, French raids took a heavy toll on the community. In 1659, Landgrave Georg II of Hesse conferred upon “his loyal subjects in the market town of Groß-Rohrheim” a free and open market, the Maimarkt, still in existence now. Over the last 50 years only 15 of the original agricultural operations at that time have survived.

== Politics ==
=== Community council ===
The municipal election held on 26 March 2006 yielded the following results:

| Parties and voter communities | % 2006 | Seats; 2006 | % 2001 | Seats; 2001 |
| Social Democratic Party of Germany | 54.1 | 10 | 62.5 | 14 |
| Christian Democratic Union of Germany | 24.6 | 5 | 25.4 | 6 |
| Bürger für Groß-Rohrheim | 21.3 | 4 | 12.1 | 3 |
| Total | 100.0 | 19 | 100.0 | 23 |
| Voter turnout in % | 52.8 | | 61.4 | |

=== Mayors ===
At the mayoral election in 2008, Rainer Bersch was victorious. He was re-elected in 2014 and 2020. From 1990 until 2008, Heinz Roos (SPD) had been Groß-Rohrheim’s mayor.

=== Town partnerships ===
- Mouzon, Ardennes, France since 1989

== Culture and sightseeing ==
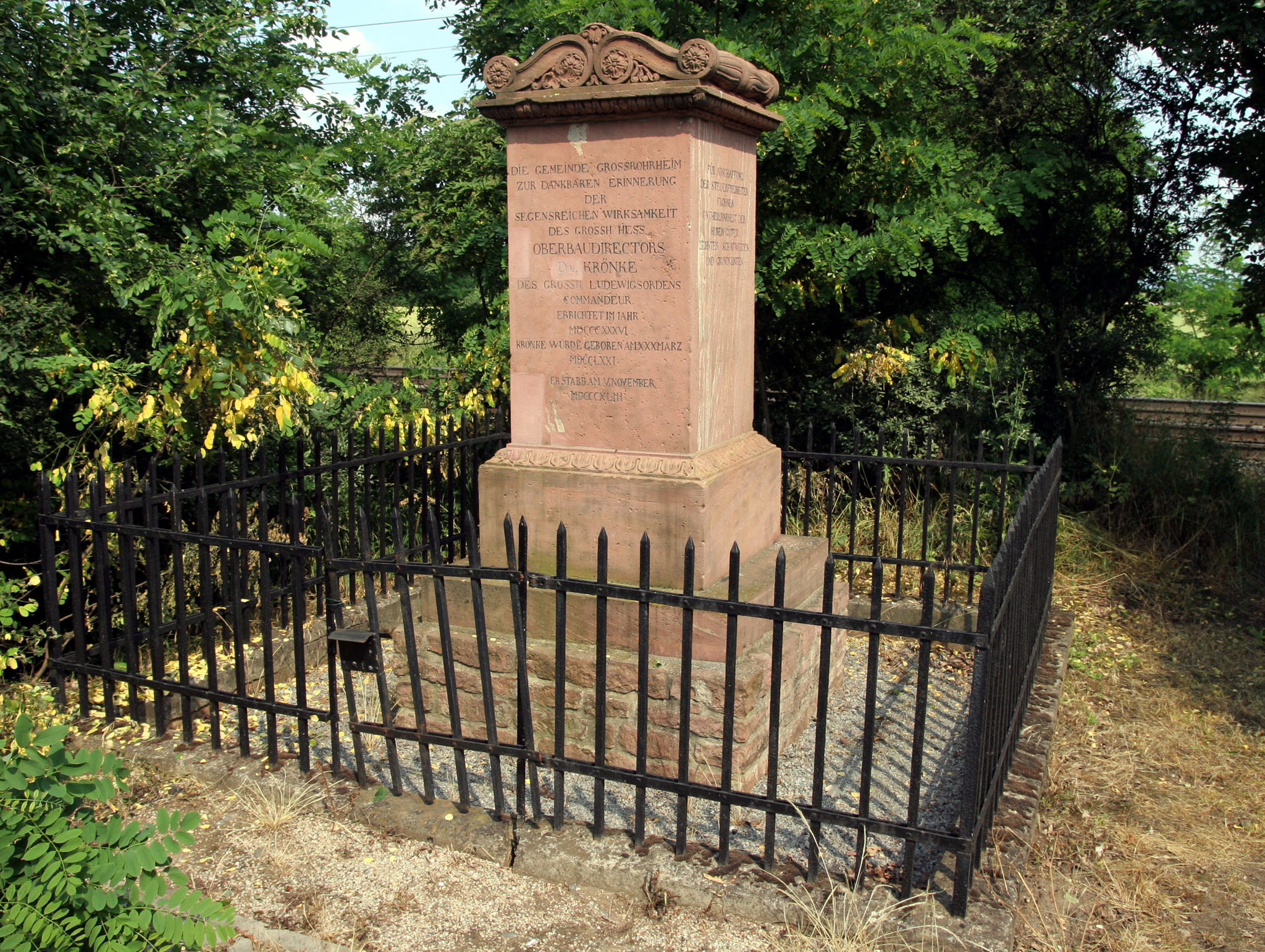
Memorial to Claus Kröncke

- Historic timber-frame houses near the Evangelical church from 1688 to 1723, as well as the ceiling paintings in the church
- Memorial to the planner of the Rhine channel, Claus Kröncke.

== Transport ==
Groß-Rohrheim lies on the Mannheim–Frankfurt railway.
