= Riedsee bei Leeheim =

Lake in Riedstadt, Hesse, Germany

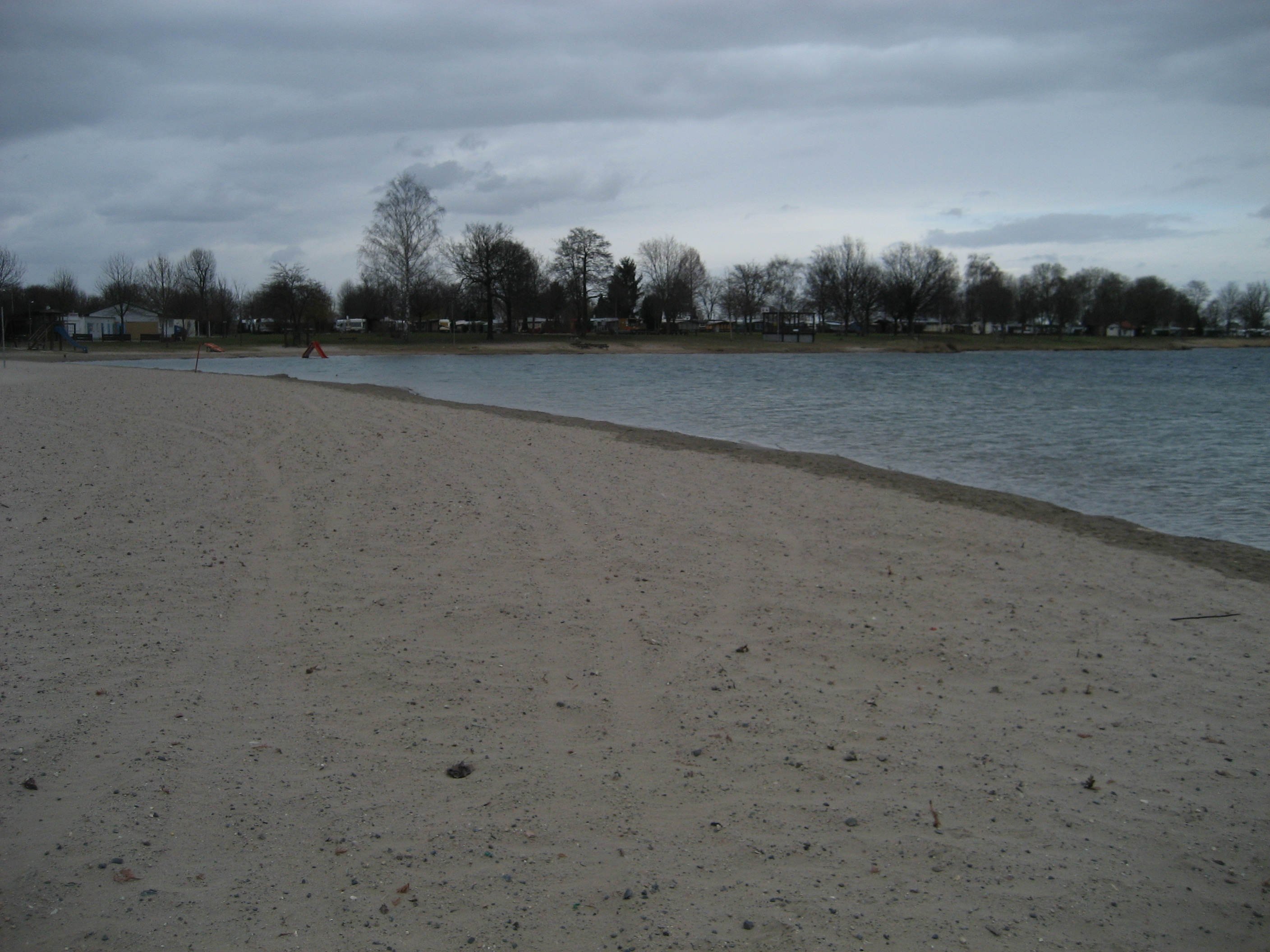

- Location within Hesse
- Location: Hesse
- Coordinates: 49°51′36″N 8°25′26″E
- Basin countries: Germany
- Surface area: ca. 24 ha (59 acres)
- Average depth: 9.11 m (29.9 ft)
- Max. depth: ca. 38 m (125 ft)
- Surface elevation: 80 m (260 ft)
- Settlements: Leeheim, Geinsheim

Riedsee bei Leeheim is a lake in Hesse, Germany. At an elevation of 80 m, its surface area is ca. 24 ha.
