= Einhausen, Hesse =

Einhausen
- Municipality
- Coat of arms

- Location of Einhausen within Bergstraße district
- Interactive map of Einhausen
- Location within Germany Location within Hesse
- Coordinates: 49°41′N 8°33′E
- Country: Germany
- State: Hesse
- Admin. region: Darmstadt
- District: Bergstraße

Government
  - Mayor (2020–26): Helmut Glanzner

Area
  - Total: 26.67 km^{2} (10.30 sq mi)
- Elevation: 93 m (305 ft)

Population (2025-12-31)
  - Total: 6,586
  - Density: 246.9/km^{2} (639.6/sq mi)
- Time zone: UTC+01:00 (CET)
  - Summer (DST): UTC+02:00 (CEST)
- Postal codes: 64683
- Dialling codes: 06251
- Vehicle registration: HP
- Website: www.einhausen.info

Einhausen (German pronunciation: [aɪnˈhaʊzn̩]) is a municipality in the Bergstraße district in Hesse, Germany, some 15 km east of Worms.

== Geography ==
=== Location ===
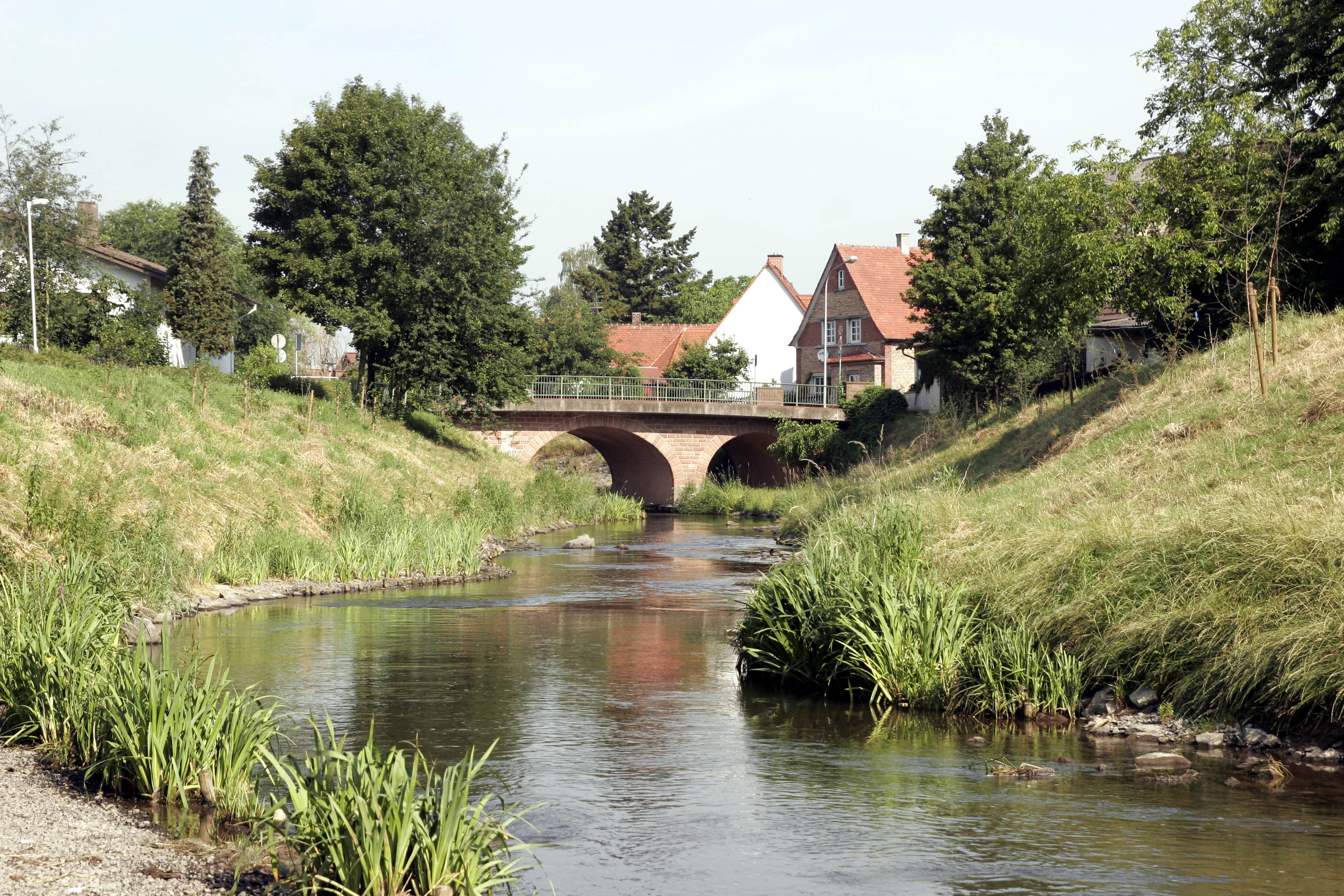
The Weschnitz, renaturalized in 2006/2007, flows through Einhausen (looking westwards)

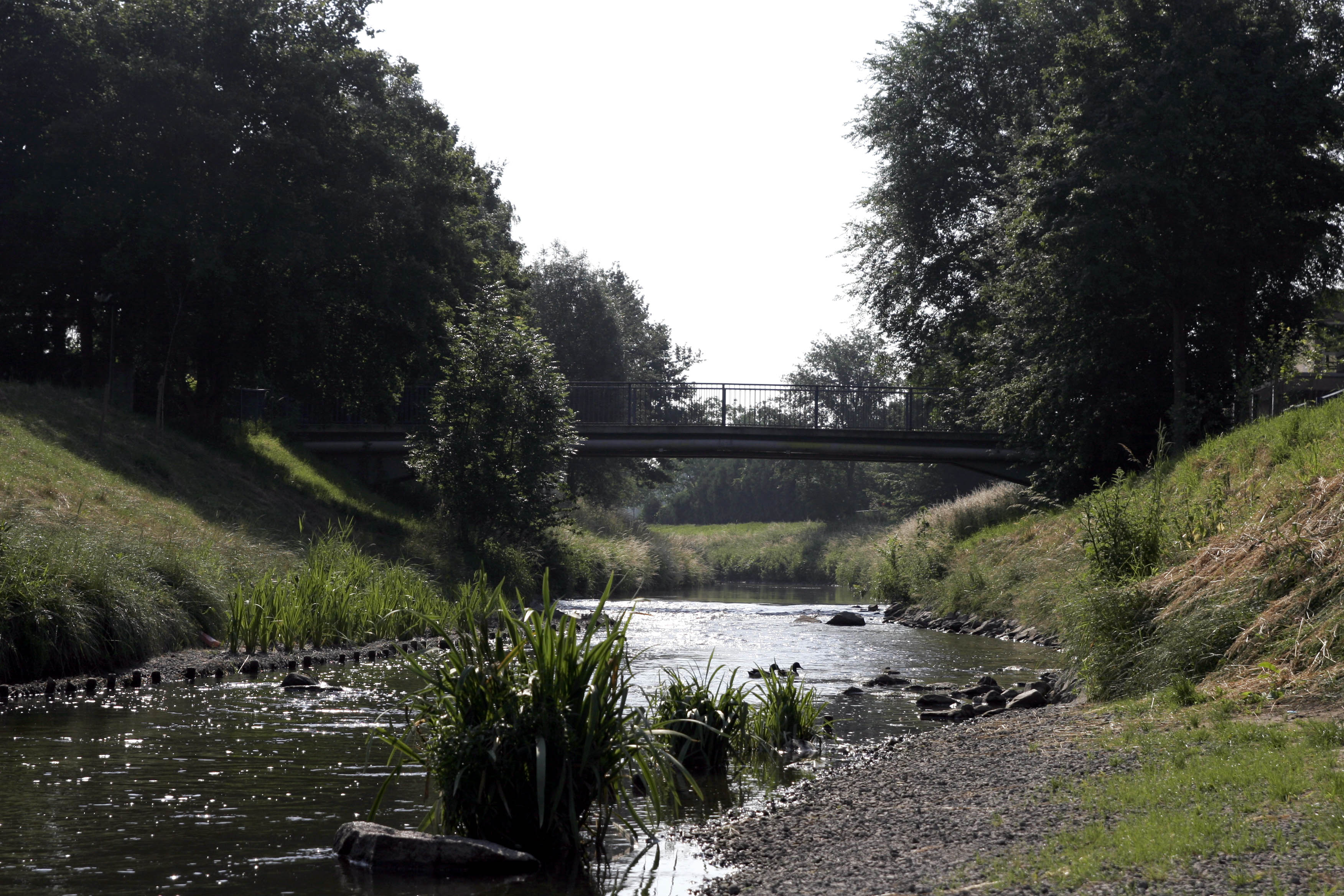
The Weschnitz in Einhausen (looking eastwards)

Einhausen lies on the Bergstraße in the Hessisches Ried and belongs the northeast Rhine valley, which has a rather favourable climate. Surrounding the community, through which flows the Weschnitz, are woods and cultivated land.

=== Neighbouring communities ===
Einhausen borders in the north on the community of Groß-Rohrheim and the town of Gernsheim (Groß-Gerau district), in the east on the towns of Bensheim and Lorsch, in the south on the town of Bürstadt and in the west on the community of Biblis.

=== Constituent communities ===
Einhausen officially consists of only one Ortsteil; however, the historical distinction between Groß-Hausen and Klein-Hausen is still heard in speech.

== History ==
The community was donated in 768 under the name Husun to the Lorsch Abbey. In the course of the Reformation and the Counterreformation there arose two politically and ecclesiastically divided communities: Groß-Hausen (Protestant), and Klein-Hausen (Catholic) which contradictorily became the larger of the two. On 1 April 1937, the two communities were merged into the community of Einhausen. (Older residents often tell the visitor that this merger was one of many mergers endorsed and signed into effect by Adolf Hitler.) As mentioned earlier, the historical distinction between Groß-Hausen and Klein-Hausen is still heard in speech today, even by younger residents.

== Politics ==
=== Community council ===
The municipal election held on 26 March 2006 yielded the following results:

Parties and voter communities		% 2006	Seats; 2006	% 2001	Seats; 2001
CDU	Christian Democratic Union of Germany	49.0	15	47.5	15
SPD	Social Democratic Party of Germany	26.0	8	28.4	9
GREENS	Bündnis 90/Die Grünen	12.1	4	11.6	3
FWG	Freie Wählergemeinschaft Einhausen	12.9	4	12.4	4
Total		100.0	31	100.0	31
Voter turnout in %		51.6		57.8	

=== Coat of arms ===
The community’s arms might be described thus: Gules a brick house Or with roof, two chimneys, a door and two windows sable, the whole on an arched bridge Or.

The bridge is symbolic of the merger of the two former communities, which were divided for centuries.

=== Town partnerships ===
- Attichy, Oise, France
- (United States) Shoreview, Minnesota, USA

== Regular events ==
=== Kirchweih/Kerwe ===
Einhausen’s Kirchweih (church consecration festival) is held each year on the first weekend in October. It is staged by the Verein zur Erhaltung der Tradition Einhausen e.V. (“Einhausen Club for Maintaining Tradition”) in collaboration with the three festival groups ADI, CHIEF and Ladännsche. Known well beyond Einhausen is the parade at this festival, which is run on the first Sunday in October.

The float built in 2007 on the theme “North Korea” was featured in the November edition of the Carnival magazine Tusch!!! (a national trade magazine published around Carnival) as Germany’s best political float of 2007.

=== Carnival ===
Known in this part of Germany as Fastnacht, this includes four of the Sitzungen (“sittings” or “sessions”) that typify this celebration. Three are Narrengiggelsitzungen and one is a Kindersitzung (for children). They are staged by the Verein zur Erhaltung der Tradition Einhausen e.V. (see above).
