= Biblis =

- Municipality
- Coat of arms

- Location of Biblis within Bergstraße district
- Interactive map of Biblis
- Location within Germany Location within Hesse
- Coordinates: 49°42′N 8°28′E
- Country: Germany
- State: Hesse
- Admin. region: Darmstadt
- District: Bergstraße

Government
  - Mayor (2019–25): Volker Scheib

Area
  - Total: 40.44 km^{2} (15.61 sq mi)
- Elevation: 93 m (305 ft)

Population (2025-12-31)
  - Total: 9,135
  - Density: 225.9/km^{2} (585.1/sq mi)
- Time zone: UTC+01:00 (CET)
  - Summer (DST): UTC+02:00 (CEST)
- Postal codes: 68647
- Dialling codes: 06245
- Vehicle registration: HP
- Website: www.biblis.eu

Biblis is a municipality in the Bergstraße district in southern Hesse, Germany.

== Geography ==
=== Location ===
The municipality lies in the Rhine rift west of the Odenwald between Darmstadt to the north and Mannheim to the south; it also lies north of Bürstadt. Biblis lies directly north of the lower reaches of the Weschnitz, which empties into the Rhine only a few kilometres northwest of the municipality.

=== Neighbouring municipalities ===
Biblis borders in the north on the municipalities of Groß-Rohrheim and Gernsheim, in the east on the municipality of Einhausen, in the south on the towns of Bürstadt and Lampertheim and in the west on the district-free city of Worms (Rhineland-Palatinate).

=== Constituent communities ===
Biblis's three Ortsteile are Biblis, Nordheim and Wattenheim.

== History ==
In 836, Biblis had its first documentary mention in the Lorsch Abbey’s Codex Laureshamensis under the name Bibifloz (“settlement at the water”) when King Louis the German donated his holdings in Biblis, Wattenheim and Zullestein to his faithful vassal Wernher, who in turn bequeathed them to the Lorsch Abbey in 846. From 1461 to 1623, the area was pledged to the Palatinate, and in the Reformation’s wake it became Protestant, although after the retrocession, it became Catholic again. During the Thirty Years' War, the municipality was laid waste several times, and the populace was decimated by the Plague. With Secularization in 1803, the municipality passed to what later became the Grand Duchy of Hesse and was assigned to the district of Worms.

In 1936 the German Luftwaffe built an airfield in Biblis disguised as a typical Hessian farm. The airfield was used during World War II to intercept allied bombers and is an equestrian centre and restaurant today.

In 1945, Biblis was split off from Worms, which became part of the new federal state of Rhineland-Palatinate, and became part of the Bergstrasse district in the state of Hesse. The formerly self-governing municipalities of Biblis, Nordheim and Wattenheim merged in 1970 to form the greater municipality of Biblis.

== Population development ==
Year	Biblis (main centre)	Nordheim	Wattenheim
1600	500		
1806	1,355	762	283
1980	5,888	1,450	930
2002	6,350	1,755	1,146
2006	6,359	1,896	1,181
2013	8,814	1,824 (2012)	1,132 (2012)

== Politics ==
=== Mayor ===
- 1995–2001: Alfred Kappel (CDU)
- 2001–2013: Hildegard Cornelius-Gaus (independent)
- 2013–2019: Felix Kusicka (CDU)
- 2019–incumbent: Volker Scheib

=== Municipality council ===
The municipal election held on 26 March 2006 yielded the following results:

Parties and voter communities		% 2006	Seats; 2006	% 2001	Seats; 2001
CDU	Christian Democratic Union of Germany	50.3	12	47.4	15
SPD	Social Democratic Party of Germany	32.9	8	38.7	12
BBF	Bibliser Bürger Forum	6.6	1	7.9	2
FLB	Freie Liste Biblis	10.2	2	6.0	2
Total		100.0	23	100.0	31
Voter turnout in %		43.9		53.8	

=== Coat of arms ===
The arms were bestowed upon the municipality of Biblis in 1950, and might be described thus: Azure a plough sinister argent, in the base a water lily argent.

Biblis's coat of arms displays the Biblis forebears’ dogged struggle against the swamp. They reclaimed the reedy country with what was then still primitive equipment. The water lily stands for the wetland while the plough stands for the clearing of the land. The tinctures come from the arms once borne by the House of Wittelsbach, once rulers of the Electorate of the Palatinate, to which Biblis belonged from 1461 to 1623.

== Religion ==
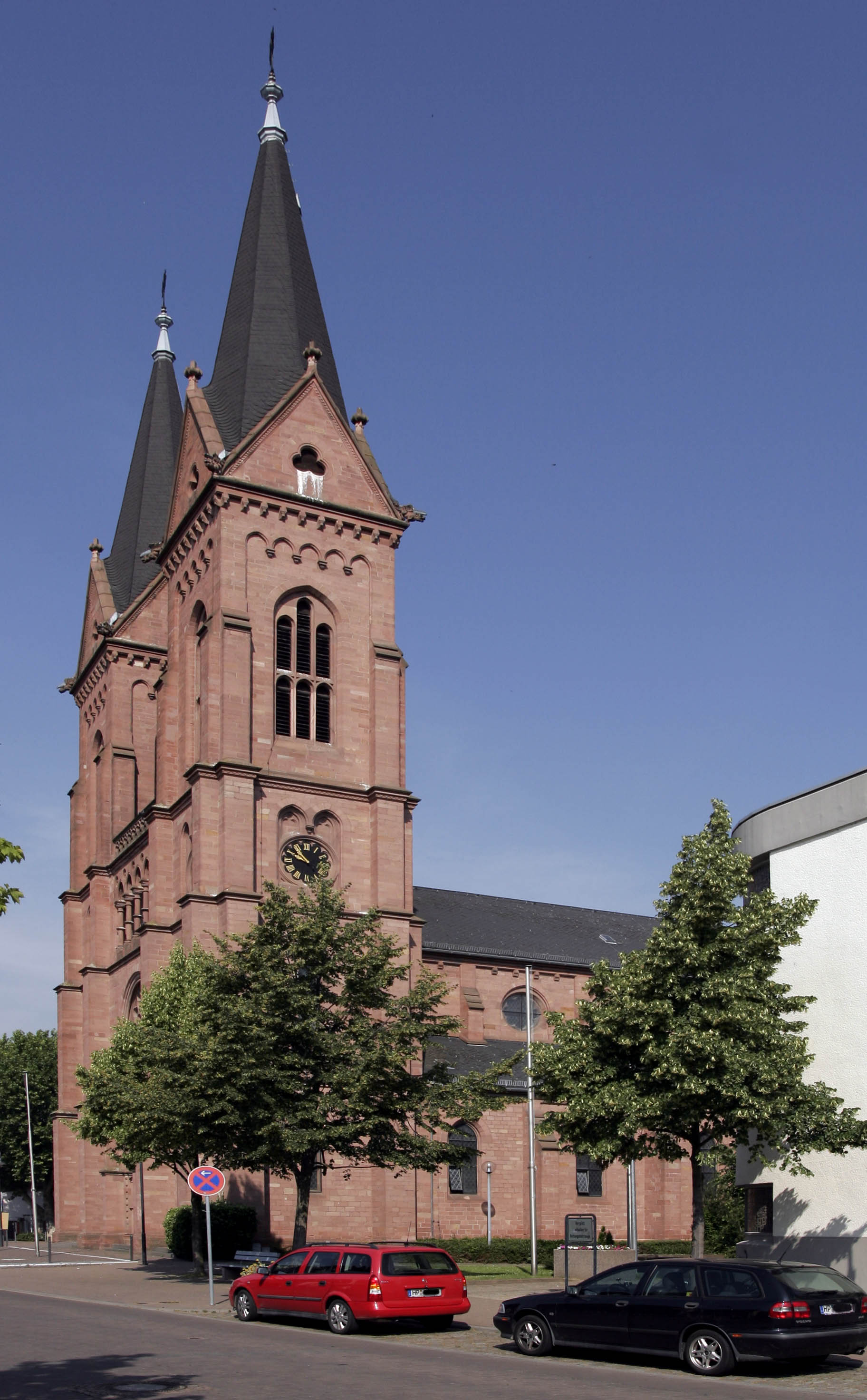
St. Bartolomew's Catholic Church

=== St. Bartolomew’s Catholic parish ===
St. Bartolomew's Church (St. Bartholomäuskirche) comes from the year 1865. The forerunner church became too small for the population, which had sharply risen.

The plans for the current church were drawn up by the then Grand Duchy of Hesse district building master Christian Horst. He designed the church as a “neo-Early Gothic”, three-naved column-borne basilica with quire and transept on the model of the Elisabeth Church in Marburg.

The Catholic parish belongs to the Biblis Catholic parish cluster, which consists of these parishes:

- St. Bartholomäus Biblis
- St. Christophorus Wattenheim
- St. Theresia v.K.J. Groß-Rohrheim
- St. Antonius Nordheim

=== Jewish community ===
In Biblis, there was a Jewish community from the 18th century until 1938. In the mid-19th century, the Jewish community numbered some 200, roughly 8% of the wider community's population. Under Rabbi Salomon Bodenheimer (1813–1886), a Talmud-Torah school and other institutions were founded, which were of great importance to Jews far beyond as well as in Biblis. The community's synagogue was built in 1832 on the lot at Enggasse 6. On Kristallnacht (9 November 1938), it was desecrated by SA members, who thoroughly destroyed the inside, after which it was used for other purposes; in 1981, it was torn down. A memorial stone still recalls the now long-gone building. At least 13 Jewish former inhabitants of Biblis were deported to the death camps where they were murdered.

== Regular events ==
Every year in June the four-day Gurkenfest (Cucumber Festival) is opened by the Gurkenkönigin (“Cucumber Queen”) for the enjoyment of the local population and visitors alike.

== Economy and infrastructure ==
=== Transport ===
Biblis lies on the Bundesstraße 44 federal road and the Landesstraße 3261 state road. Autobahn interchanges are in Lorsch, Heppenheim and Gernsheim, about 10 km away. Biblis station has direct connections to Mannheim (half-hourly), Frankfurt (hourly) and Worms (hourly).

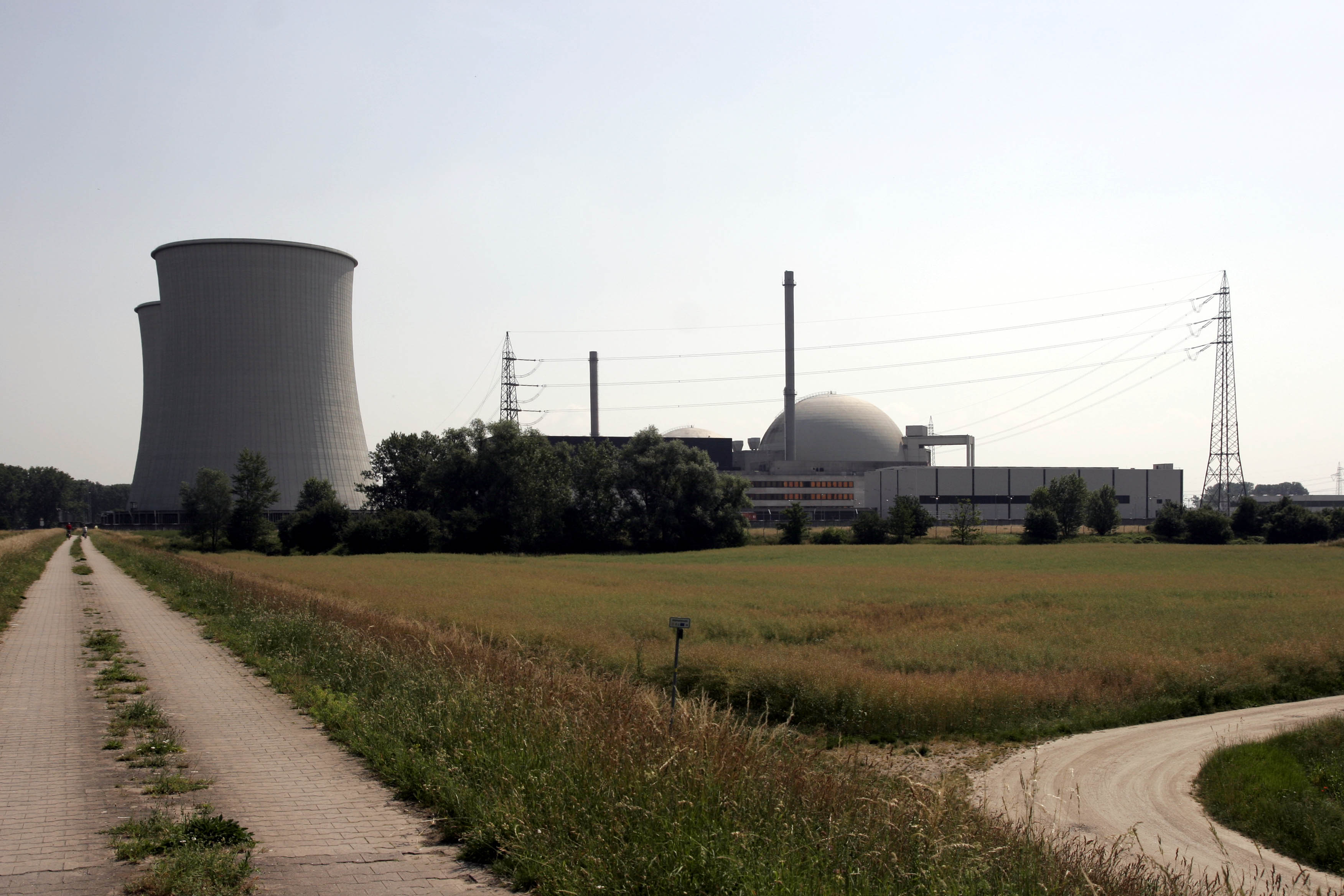
The Biblis Nuclear Power Plant seen from the south

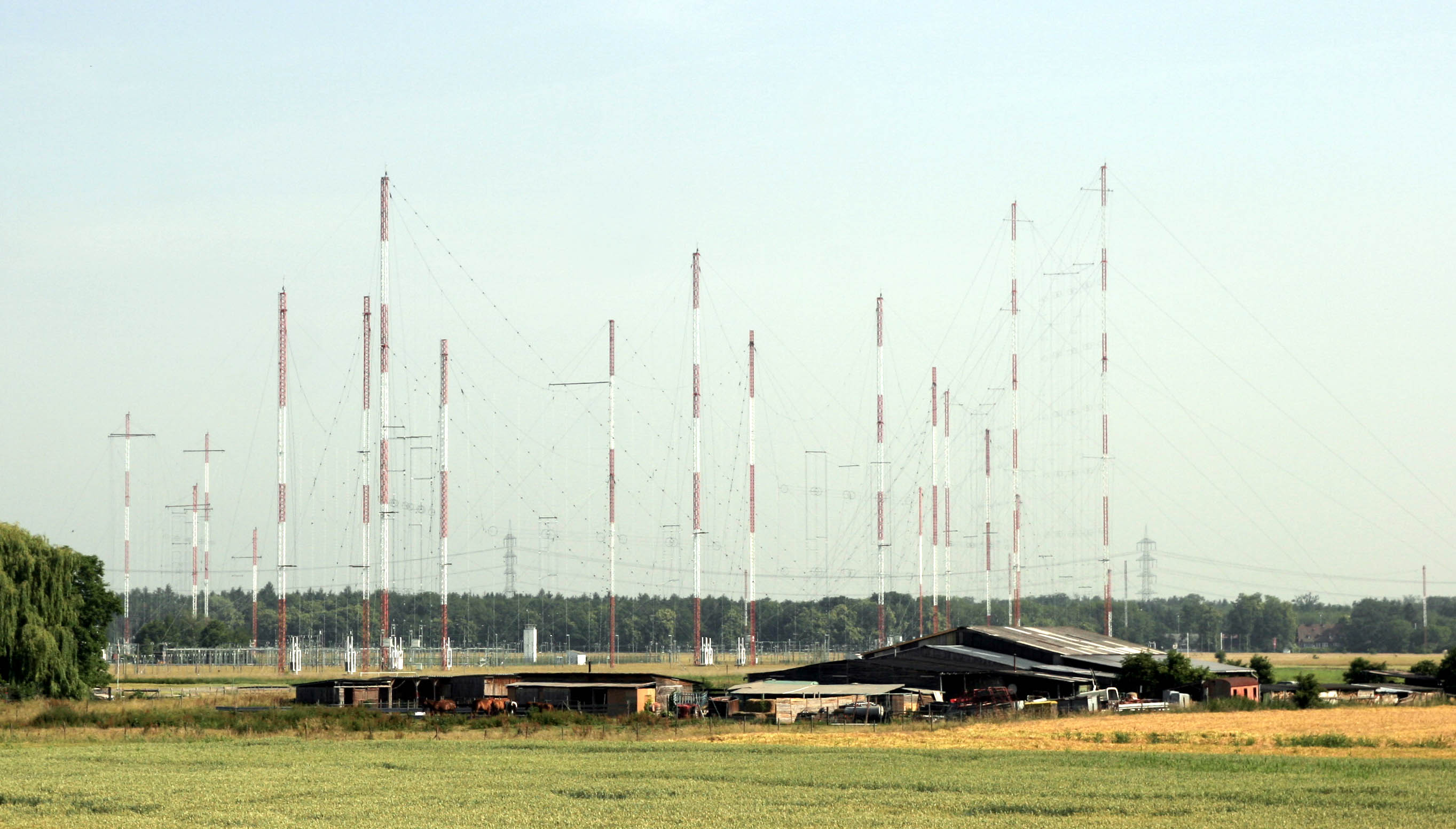
Radio Free Europe’s transmitter

=== Education ===
- Katholische Kindertagesstätte Sonnenschein (Catholic daycare)
- Kindergarten Pusteblume
- Schule in den Weschnitzauen (primary school and Hauptschule)

=== Nuclear power station ===
Biblis has the Biblis Nuclear Power Plant, situated on the river Rhine with two blocks of pressurized water reactors - Biblis A and Biblis B. Together the blocks produce a power output of 2 500 MW. Block A came online in 1974 and Block B in 1976. At the time of opening, "Biblis" was the biggest nuclear power plant in the world and a milestone in electric power generation.

=== Other facilities ===
East of Biblis is found a transmission facility used by the American shortwave overseas broadcaster Radio Free Europe with antenna masts up to 125 m tall which bear the “curtain” antennae.

Near Nordheim, three parallel high-voltage network overhead transmission lines cross the Rhine on pylons up to 103 m tall.

== Notable people ==
- Moritz Hochschild, Hero in WWII and Mining at Bolívia
- Uwe Ochsenknecht, actor
- Klaus Schlappner, football trainer
