= Bergstraße =

Bergstraße or Bergstrasse can refer to:

- Bergstraße Route, literally "Mountain Road", in the Odenwald of Baden-Württemberg and Hesse, Germany
- Bergstraße (district), a district in Hesse, Germany
- Hessische Bergstraße, a Hessian winegrowing region
- Badische Bergstraße, a winegrowing region in Baden-Württemberg, Germany
