= Gassensensationen =

Theatre festival in Germany

Gassensensationen is an international street theatre festival in Heppenheim, Bergstraße. It is held in July.

The first Gassensensationen street theater festival took place in Heppenheim from July 10–13, 1993. Since then, the event series has showcased artists and ensembles from around the world annually. The spectrum of performances ranges from street and square productions to shadow puppetry, stilt and puppet theater, performance art, and comedy. Original productions and art projects in the field of street theater, created specifically for Gassensensationen, have been a regular feature of the festival since 1994. All events are free of charge. The organizer is the city of Heppenheim. The artistic director of Gassensensationen is Stefan Behr.

The festival takes place after the first weekend in July, from Wednesday to Saturday. Performances are held in the squares of the historic old town as well as on the local open-air stage. More than 25,000 visitors attend the approximately 50 events each year. The street performances are financed by public funds, sponsorship money, and grants from a support association.

Theater Anu emerged from the festival in 1998. From 2001 to 2004, the Heppenheim Lantern Trail was created as part of the festival: 150 paper cutouts depicting scenes from Hessian legends are displayed on the streetlights of the old town. The Lantern Trail is open year-round. Guided tours are offered every Saturday from May to September.
