= Leipzig Long-Distance Bus Terminal =

Bus station in Leipzig

Coordinates: 51.3451°N 12.3849°E

Leipzig Long-Distance Bus Terminal Fernbusterminal Leipzig
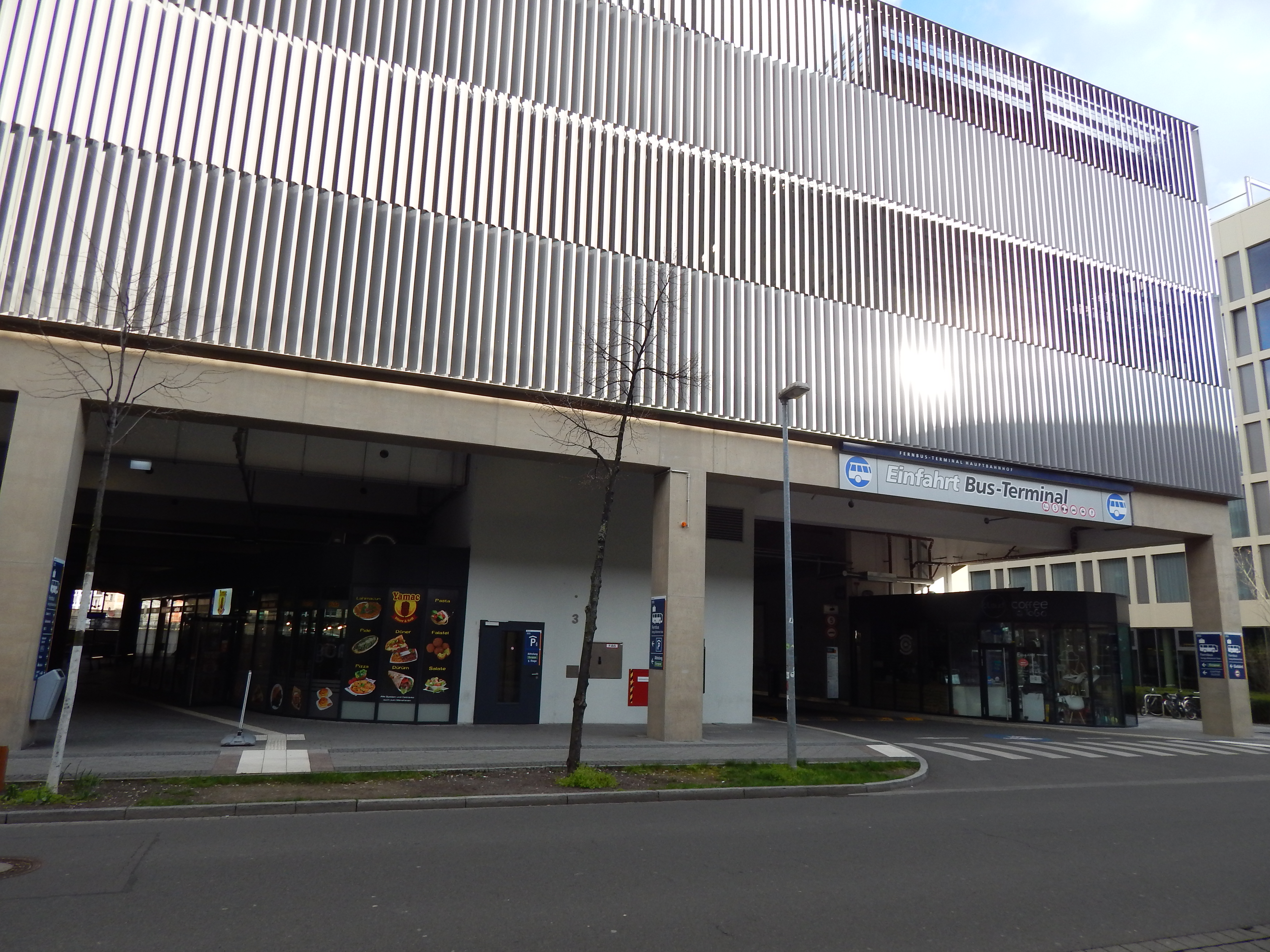

Other information
- Website: www.goldbeck-parking.de/fernbusterminal
Location

The Leipzig Long-Distance Bus Terminal (Fernbusterminal Leipzig) is the central bus station for Intercity bus services in Leipzig, Germany. It opened in 2018 and is located on the east side of the main train station.

== Description ==
The nine bus gates are located on the ground floor of a multistorey car park with 553 parking spaces; two additional bus gates are outside. The car park and the long-distance bus terminal are operated by Goldbeck Parking Services. The bus entrance is on the western side, on the street called Sachsenseite; on the eastern side, the terminal building is bordered by Brandenburger Strasse. The main train station is a few meters away, as are two hotels that were built in direct connection with the long-distance bus terminal.

Sanitary facilities, retail, restaurants, and a 700 square metres (7,535 sq ft) service area were integrated into the terminal. It, along with the two hotels, was planned, financed, built, and marketed by the private project developer S&G Development GmbH. The investment costs for the long-distance bus terminal are estimated at €17 million, and for the hotels at a further €72 million.

== Bus service ==
After one year it was reported in 2019 that a total of 27,900 long-distance buses had stopped at the terminal, which corresponds to an average passenger volume of around 125,000 passengers per month.

In the same year, 27 different bus companies, including FlixBus, used the terminal. From a transport perspective, the sources emphasize the intermodal passenger transport means at this location (long-distance buses in the terminal, long-distance trains in the main station, S-Bahn in the Leipzig City Tunnel, the trams interchange in front of Leipzig Hauptbahnhof, as well as parking spaces in the multi-storey car park, bicycle rentals, carsharing, rental cars).

== Architecture ==
The Dortmund-based architectural firm Gerber Architekten won an international architectural design competition. The most striking feature of the terminal building is the partially translucent steel cladding, which has been described as elegant, timeless, and unobtrusive. The urban space east of the main station has been enhanced by a high-quality plaza with stone benches, rows of trees, and strips of lawn.

== Gallery ==
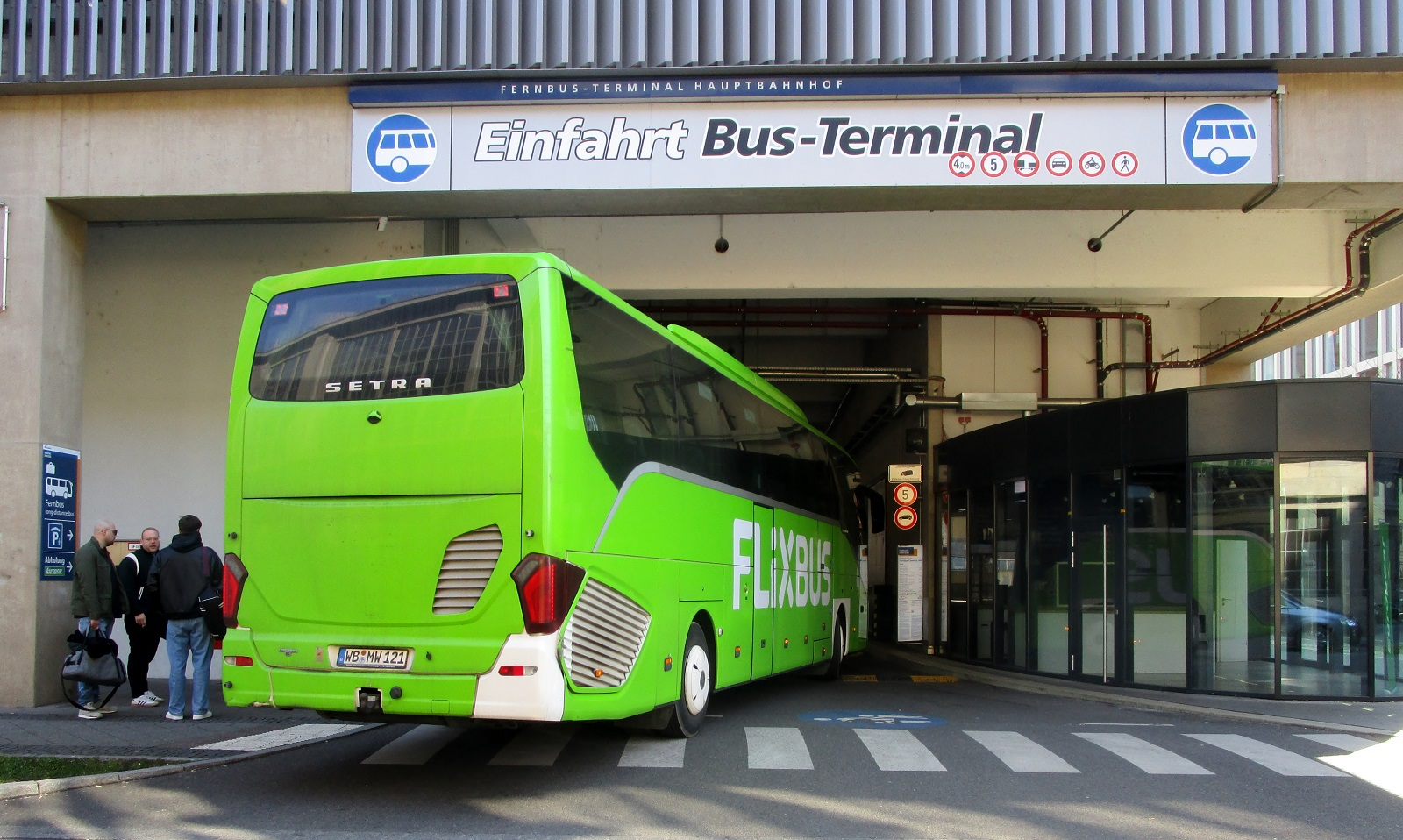
Bus enters the long-distance bus terminal

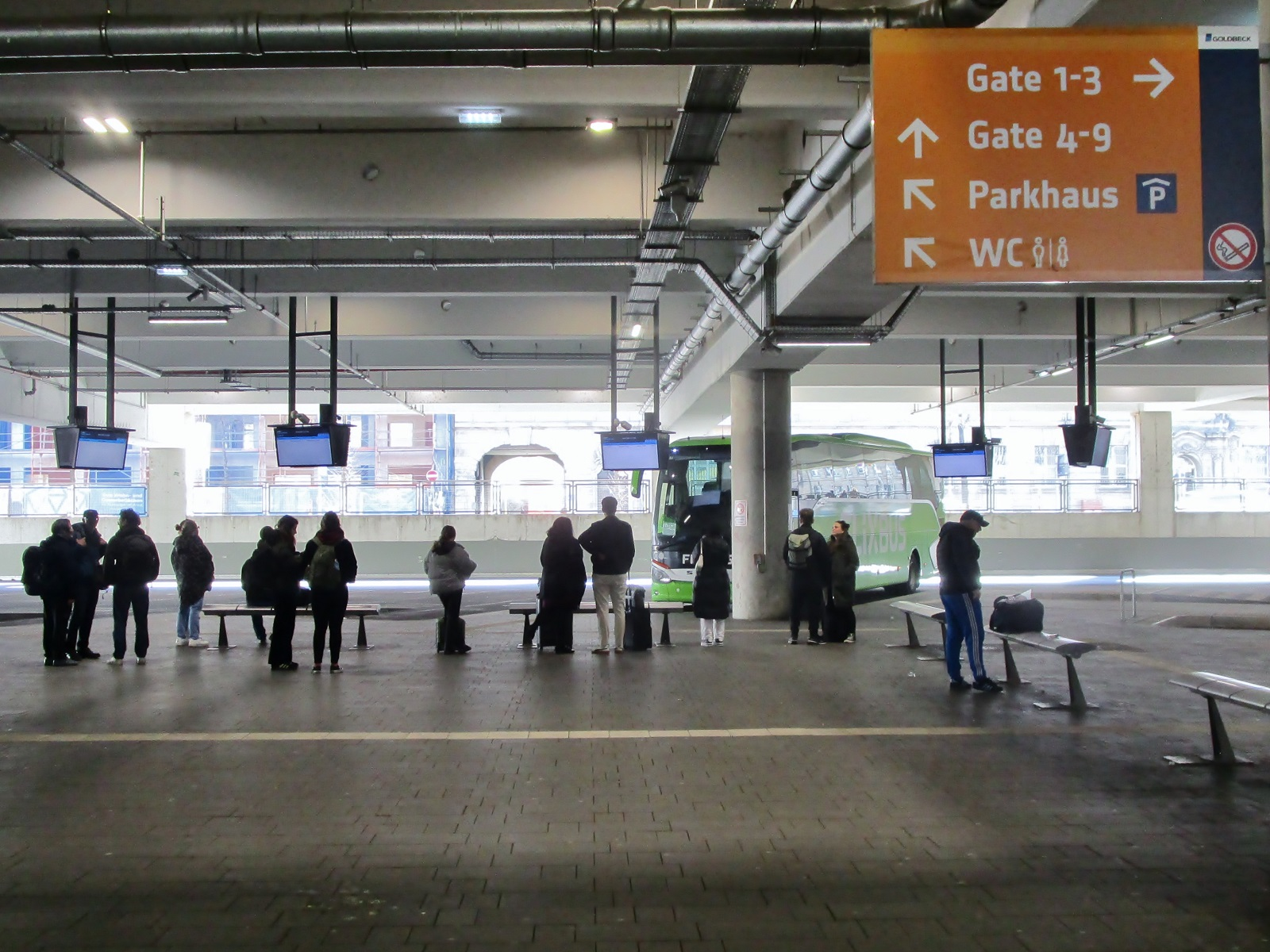
Inside the long-distance bus terminal

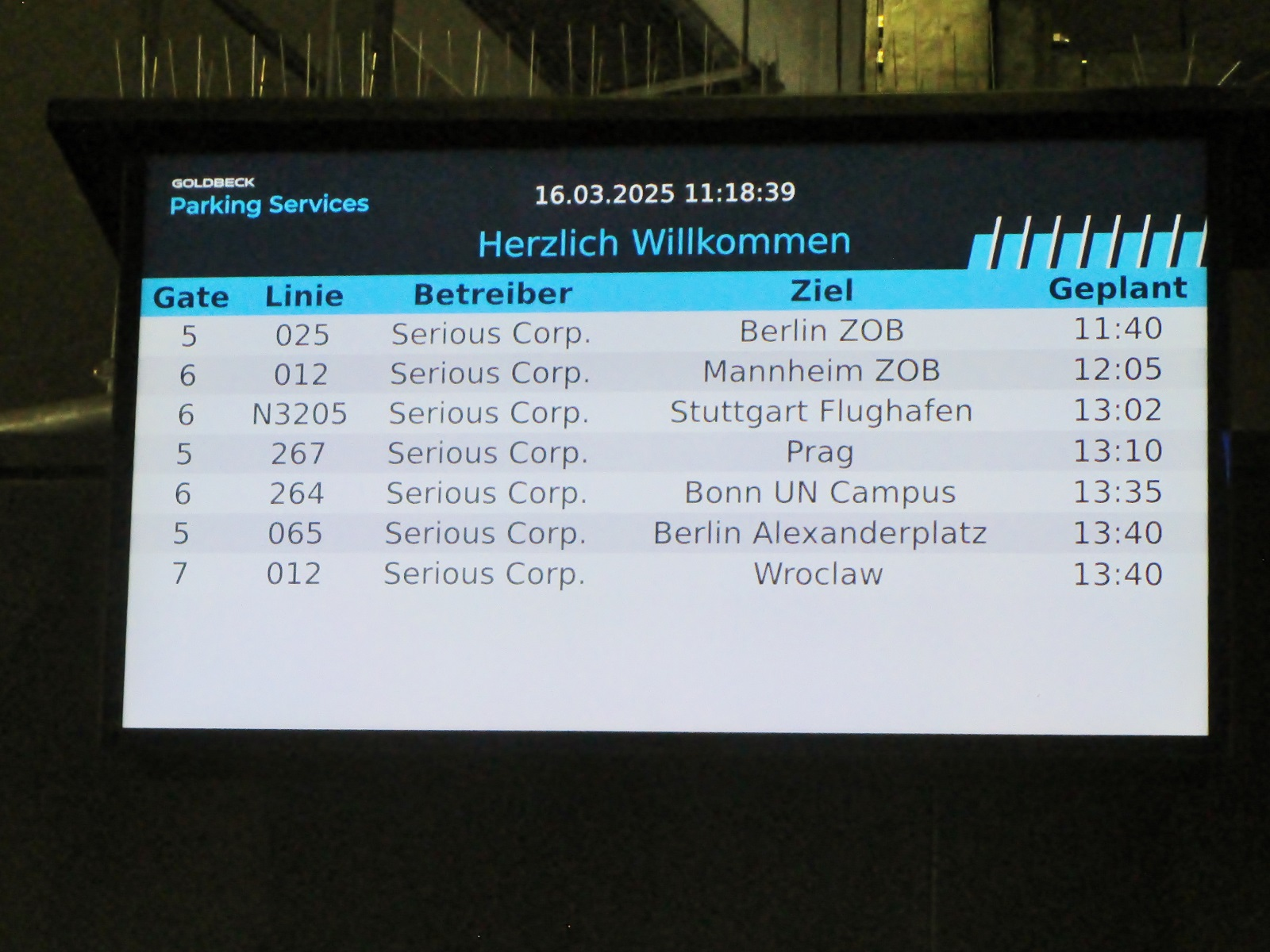
Display board in the long-distance bus terminal

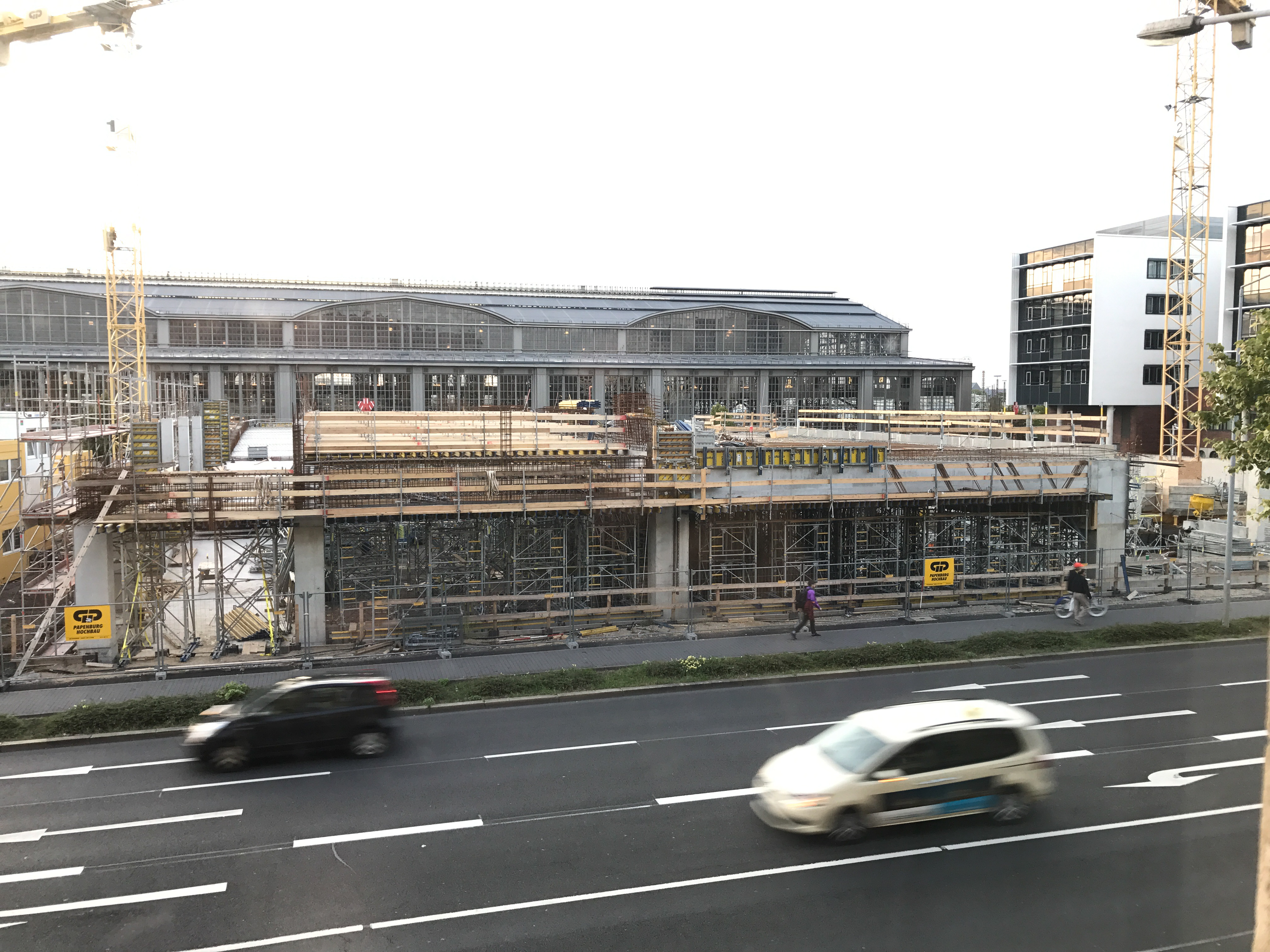
Long-distance bus terminal under construction (2017)

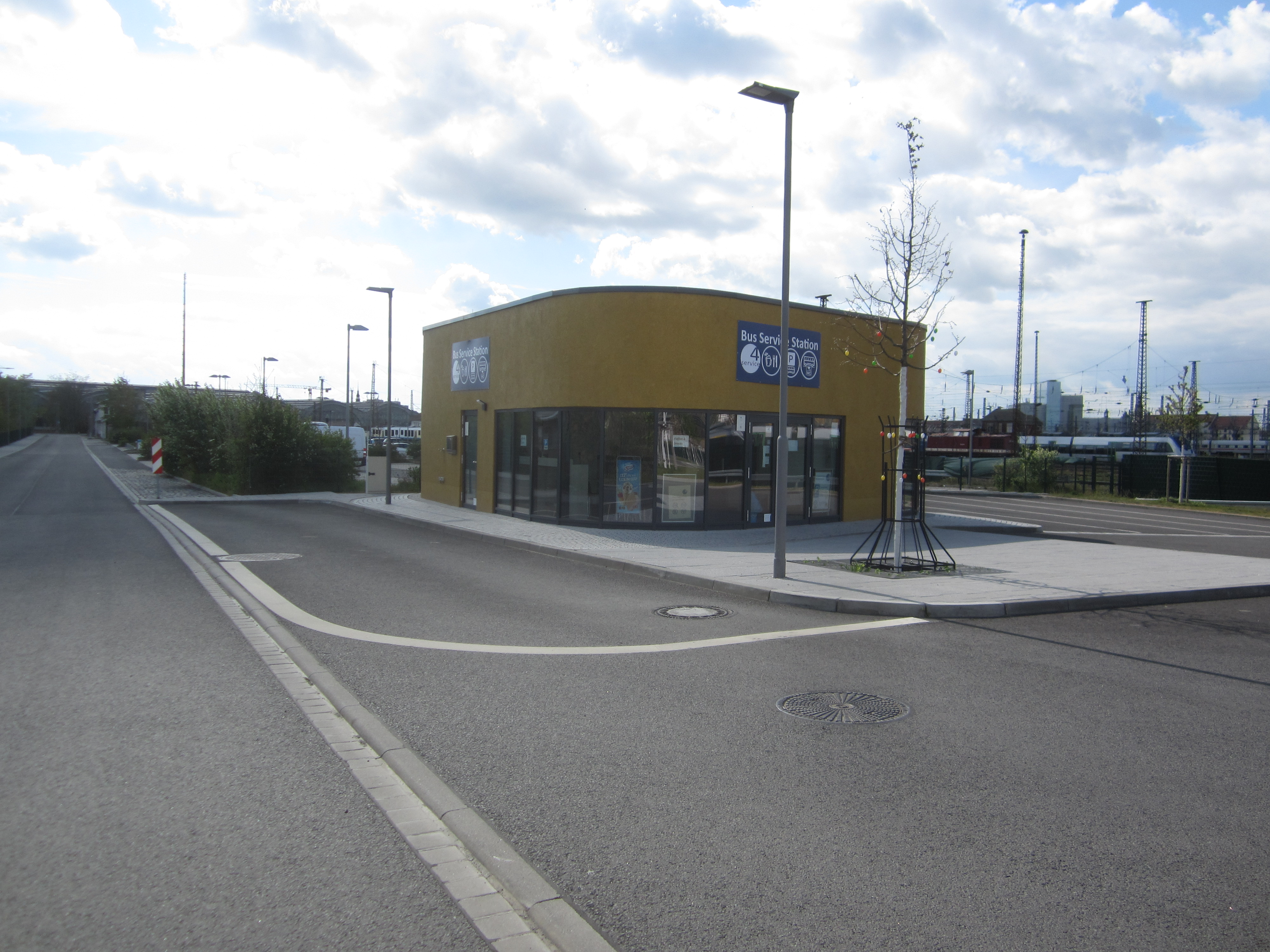
Service facility for bus drivers built for the long-distance bus terminal near the Brandenburg Bridge
