= Ober-Laudenbach =

Coordinates: 49°37′N 8°40′E

Ober-Laudenbach is a district of the town of Heppenheim in the state of Hesse, Germany. Formerly an independent municipality, it was merged into Heppenheim in 1971.

== History ==
Archaeological finds (burial mounds) show that Ober-Laudenbach was already a settlement 4000 years ago. Laudenbach was first documented in 795, referred to as Lutenbach. Around 1200, it became the principal town of Ober-Laudenbach.
