= Bergstraße (route) =

Ancient trade route in Germany

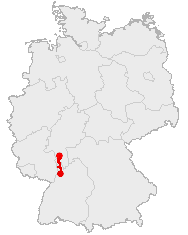
The Bergstraße route

The Bergstraße (German pronunciation: [ˈbɛʁkˌʃtʁaːsə], lit. 'Mountain Road') is an 80-kilometre-long (50 mi) ancient trade route in the south-west of Germany, running north‒south from Darmstadt via Heidelberg to Wiesloch. The route and the area around it is a mountainous "theme route" running north–south along the western edge of the Odenwald forest in southern Hesse and northern Baden-Württemberg. The route passes through the Bergstraße administrative district, and independent viticultural regions of Hessische Bergstraße and Badische Bergstraße. Between the cities of Heidelberg and Weinheim the Upper Rhine Railway Company (OEG) tram route runs alongside.

== Route ==
The route goes almost straight from north to south at the spot where the Rhine lowlands meet the western edge of the Odenwald. The name comes from the road's route along the foot of the mountains, the Rhine lowlands once being too damp to build a road there.

The route mostly follows the modern B3 road. It begins in Darmstadt and, after passing through Eberstadt, splits into the "Old Bergstraße" and the "New Bergstraße", which goes somewhat further to the west. The two routes meet again at Zwingenberg.

In Weinheim-Lützelsachsen an old and a new Bergstraße once more form, the new one passing west of the old route as far as Heidelberg-Handschuhsheim, where the two meet once more. The route carrying on after the Neckar from Heidelberg to Wiesloch is still usually known as the Bergstraße, even though the type of country and climate typical of the Bergstraße is no longer as pronounced.

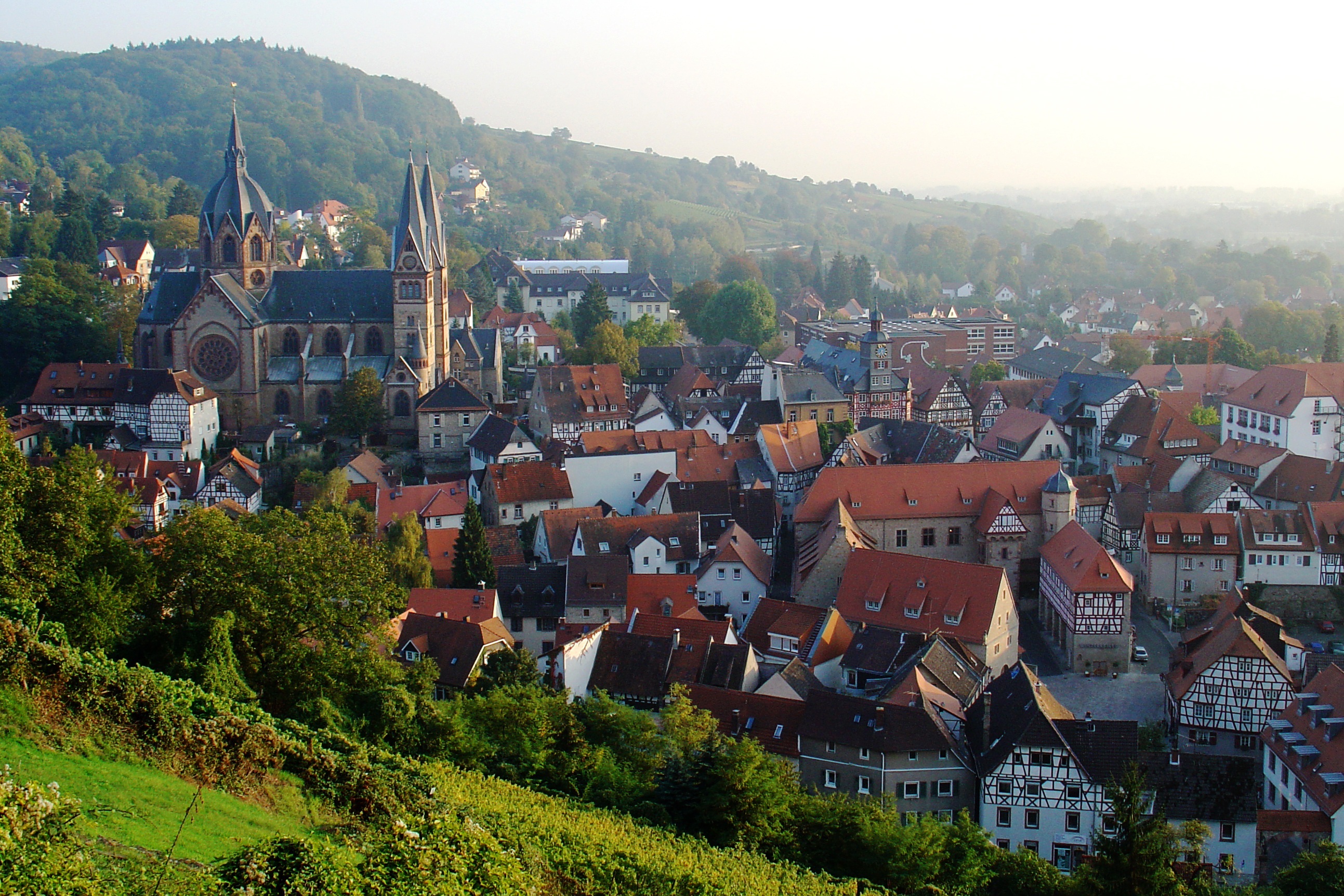
Heppenheim

The Bergstraße passes through three rural districts and two urban districts: Darmstadt, Landkreis Darmstadt-Dieburg, Kreis Bergstraße, Heidelberg and the Rhein-Neckar-Kreis. The northern part belongs to Hesse and the southern part to Baden. The border between these two Länder is between Heppenheim and Laudenbach.

The Bergstraße was used as a trading route as far back as Roman times. The name bergstrasen was first recorded in 1165. A Latinised form of the name (strata montana) did not arise from the Romans but during the Renaissance. Older names are: strata publica (795), platea montium (819) and montana platea (1002).

The route has changed slightly in places across the centuries. In 1955 traces of the old paved Roman road were discovered during work on the drains in Heppenheim. They were moved to the Ferdinand Feuerbach Unit (on the corner of Karlstraße and Karl-Marx-Straße) and can still be seen there today. They cover an area of about 20 m².

== Places along the route ==
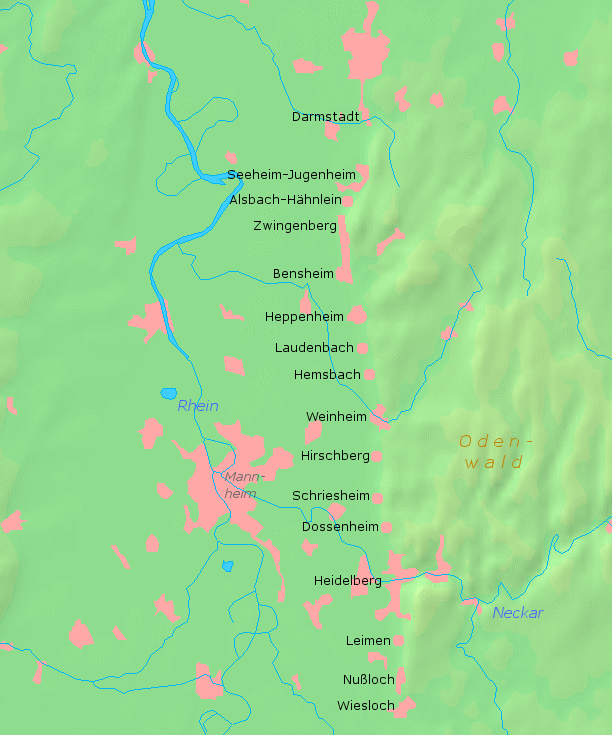
Bergstraße

The Bergstraße travels through the following towns (from north to south):

- Darmstadt
  - Darmstadt
  - Darmstadt-Eberstadt
- Seeheim-Jugenheim (Old Bergstraße)
  - Malchen
  - Seeheim
  - Jugenheim
- Alsbach-Hähnlein (Old Bergstraße)
  - Alsbach
- Bickenbach (New Bergstraße)
- Zwingenberg
- Bensheim
  - Bensheim-Auerbach
  - Bensheim
- Heppenheim
- Laudenbach (Rhein-Neckar)
- Hemsbach
- Weinheim
  - Weinheim-Sulzbach
  - Weinheim
  - Weinheim-Lützelsachsen
  - Weinheim-Hohensachsen
- Hirschberg an der Bergstraße
  - Großsachsen
  - Leutershausen
- Schriesheim
- Dossenheim
- Heidelberg
  - Heidelberg-Handschuhsheim
  - Heidelberg-Neuenheim
  Neckar
  - Heidelberg
  - Heidelberg-Rohrbach
- Leimen (Baden)
- Nußloch
- Wiesloch

== Countryside ==
The countryside directly along the route is also named after the road. The weather in the region is typically particularly mild and sunny, with around 1500 hours of sun every year. Spring starts earlier here than anywhere else in Germany. This and the good soil conditions (a fertile loess soil) make the Bergstraße one of Germany's richest fruit-producing areas, with grapes, other fruit, almonds, sweet chestnuts and walnuts. The Bergstraße is famous for its almond trees which thrive in the area and bloom as early as March. Other Mediterranean plants such as figs and olive trees also grow there.

Because of the mild climate, Joseph II, Holy Roman Emperor (1765–1790), pausing at the Bergstraße on a trip back from Frankfurt am Main, is said to have exclaimed "This is where Germany starts to become Italy".

As part of the conurbation at the point where the Rhine, Main and Neckar rivers meet, the Bergstraße is highly developed and industrialised. But tourism is also of some importance there. Apart from the countryside, the most important sights are Heidelberg with its castle and old city; Darmstadt, the center of Jugendstil art, with its artists' colony; the chain of castles on the edge of the Oden forest (Castle Frankenstein, Alsbach Castle, Auerbach Castle, Starkenburg above Heppenheim, Wachenburg and Windeck above Weinheim, Strahlenburg above Schriesheim), as well as the picturesque old town centers in many cities and towns, especially the almost completely preserved (except for the city walls) town of Heppenheim with its splendid city hall, marketplace, "Bergstraße Cathedral", and numerous medieval half-timbered structures; and in addition the old town centers of Zwingenberg, Bensheim and Weinheim. An extraordinary sight in the immediate vicinity of the Bergstraße is the Carolingian-era entrance hall of the one-time Lorsch monastery, designated by UNESCO as a world cultural heritage site.

== Population history ==
The Bergstraße area was settled in early times. Numerous excavations have uncovered finds dating back to the times of the Linear Pottery c. 5500 BC and Corded Ware cultures, who tilled the land and herded cattle there in around 2500 to 1500 BC. The population grew in Roman times and settlements were built in different sizes, villae rusticae. These were the dominant economic units of the mountainous country along the Bergstraße between 120 and 260 AD.

== See also ==
- Heidelberg‒Wiesloch Electric Railway
- Hessische Bergstraße, one of 13 regions for quality wine in Germany
