= Goldbeck Solar =

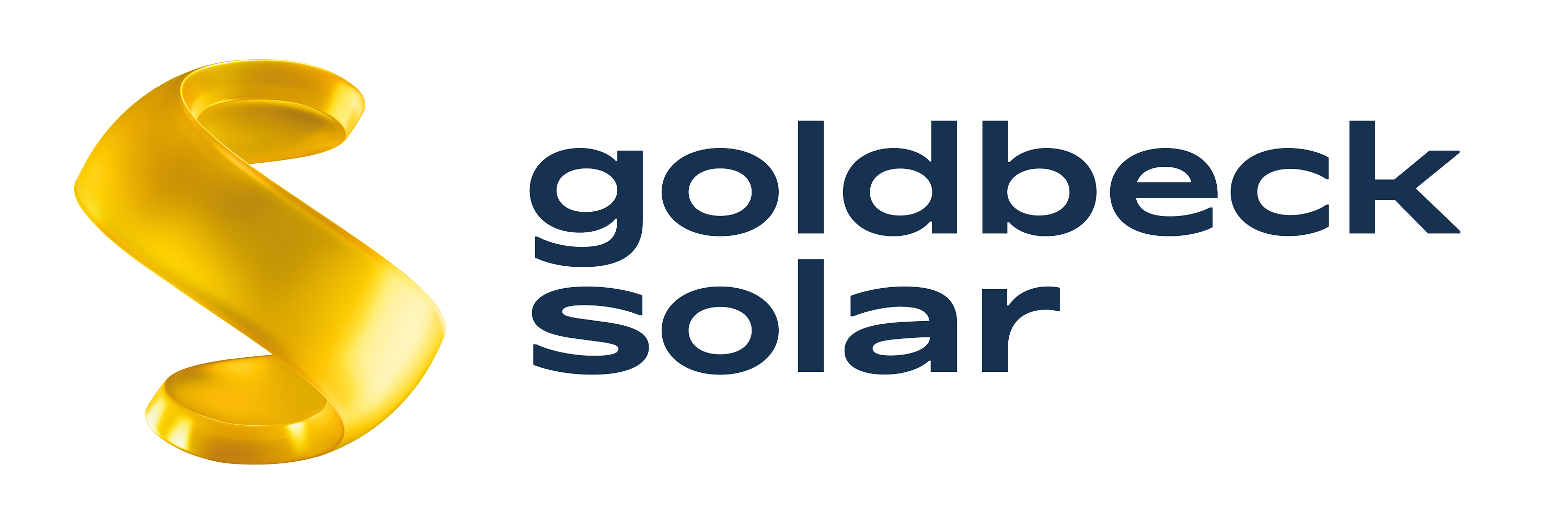
- Type: GmbH
- Industry: Solar power
- Founded: 2001; 25 years ago
- Founder: Joachim Goldbeck
- Headquarters: Hirschberg an der Bergstraße, Germany
- Key people: Joachim Goldbeck; Tobias Roland Schüssler
- Revenue: €218.8 million(2023)
- Number of employees: 560(2026)
- Website: goldbecksolar.com

Goldbeck Solar GmbH is a solar energy company headquartered in Hirschberg an der Bergstraße in Baden-Württemberg. The company offers utility-scale photovoltaic systems for open spaces or industrial and commercial roofs, as well as their commissioning and maintenance in Europe, South and North America and Central Asia.

== History ==
In 2001, entrepreneur Joachim Goldbeck founded Goldbeck Solar GmbH as a subsidiary of the Bielefeld-based Goldbeck Group in Ichtershausen near Erfurt. Initially, Goldbeck Solar focused on the installation of photovoltaic systems on industrial buildings and commercial roofs and developed the "Sunovation" substructure system.

In 2004, the company headquarters were relocated to Hirschberg an der Bergstraße in Baden-Württemberg. In 2007, the company began its international expansion and increasingly built ground-mounted solar power plants in Germany and abroad. The first large ground-mounted projects were completed in Spain in 2008. The following year, the company expanded to the Czech Republic and Slovakia, and in 2011 to the United Kingdom.

In 2010, Goldbeck Solar developed a mounting system for flat-roof solar systems in collaboration with German companies Ensinger and BASF. The firm launched the substructure for this system under the "Sunolition" brand. In 2015, Goldbeck Solar took over the operations of Soventix and Gehrlicher Solar.

Solarnet GmbH, also founded by Joachim Goldbeck, oversees Goldbeck Solar's non-European business and made its initial expansion into Latin America and Asia in 2016. In 2017, Goldbeck Solar established a branch in Mexico City and entered the Chilean and Thai markets. During the same year, Chint Solar and Goldbeck Solar completed the "Solar Park Veendam" project in Veendam, the Netherlands.

Amidst a downturn in the European solar market starting in 2015, Joachim Goldbeck, then managing director of construction firm Goldbeck Group, planned a €100 million investment in the Kazakh solar market. This initiative led to disagreements within Goldbeck Group, culminating in the establishment of Goldbeck Solar as an independent entity in 2018. Joachim Goldbeck Holding GmbH has since been operating as the controlling company of Goldbeck Solar. Solarnet and Goldbeck Solar Investment were subsequently established as affiliated companies to manage Goldbeck Solar's photovoltaic projects, including financing and commercial operation.

Goldbeck Solar has also been present in the Kazakh market since 2018, where it built the largest solar power plant in Central Asia in 2018 on an area of 160 hectares in the Karaganda region.

In 2020, the subsidiary Zonnepark Services was founded in the Netherlands together with Chint Solar.

In 2022, Goldbeck Solar took over the North American PV business of GP Joule. This was officially renamed Goldbeck Solar Canada / USA in 2023 (formerly: GP Joule Canada / USA). The completion of the "Youngstown Solar Park" in Alberta, which is expected to generate around 13,000 megawatt hours of electric energy per year, was announced in late 2023. In December 2023, Goldbeck Solar and Suncatcher Gruppe sold a solar power complex in Barlinek, Poland.

In 2024, the GOLDBECK SOLAR Group, as part of Joachim Goldbeck Holding, received the 2024 TOP 100 Seal, which recognizes particularly innovative medium-sized companies. In addition, construction began on the Bartow solar park, which, with a capacity of 260 MWp and an area of over 205 hectares, ranks among the largest solar parks in Germany.

In 2025, the company achieved a construction output of 1 GW and a cumulative installed capacity of 4.6 GW. With the introduction of ISO 9001 and other certifications, key quality and process standards were established. The EcoVadis Silver rating and the publication of a voluntary ESG report documented the company’s existing activities in the areas of sustainability and corporate responsibility.

== Corporate structure ==
Joachim Goldbeck Holding GmbH is the main shareholder of Goldbeck Solar GmbH.

The managing directors of Goldbeck Solar are Joachim Goldbeck, Tobias Roland Schüssler and Michiel Vanhouette. In the 2023 financial year, the company generated sales of €218.8 million and employed 150 people. Joachim Goldbeck Holding GmbH holds 98% of the shares in Goldbeck Solar.

Subsidiaries of Goldbeck Solar GmbH are:

- Goldbeck Solar España S.L., Madrid/Spain
- Solar Polska Sp z o.o., Komorniki/Poland
- Goldbeck Solar Ltd, Birmingham/England
- Goldbeck Solar Nederland B.V., Zuidbroek/Netherlands
- Too Pv Construction, Saran/Kazakhstan
- Goldbeck Italia S.L.R. Bergamo/Italy
- Zonnepark Services Nederland B.V., Utrecht/Netherlands
- Goldbeck Solar Thailand Co, Ltd, Bangkok/Thailand
- Goldbeck Solar Canada Corp., Toronto/Canada

Managing director Joachim Goldbeck has also been the President of the German Solar Industry Association (BSW-Solar) since 2014.

== Products and services ==
Goldbeck Solar offers turnkey installations of commercial photovoltaic systems for open spaces or commercial roofs in Europe, Central Asia and North and South America. The company also provides maintenance services for solar power plants. Goldbeck Solar plans, builds and maintains solar plants and parks, Goldbeck Solar Investment develops, finances and operates solar projects and the third branch of Goldbeck Solar holds a majority stake in PMT, which develops and produces substructures for solar plants.

Together with the Fraunhofer ITWM, Goldbeck Solar also developed the "Solar Planner" software, which calculates system variants and makes them economically comparable.
