= Heidelberg–Wiesloch Electric Railway =

Railway line in Germany

Coordinates: 49.3432°N 8.6936°E

The Heidelberg‒Wiesloch Electric Railway (Elektrische Bahn Heidelberg – Wiesloch) is a metre gauge railway and tram line running along the Bergstraße route form Heidelberg southwards towards Wiesloch, Germany. As of 2020 the northern section of the route carries as Line 23 of the Heidelberg Tramway system, terminating at Leimen Cemetery. The southern section, which carried tram Line 8 between Leimen and Wiesloch Schillerpark closed in 1973.

The closed section ran directly through the villages of Rohrbach, Leimen, and Nußloch providing a parallel service to the Baden main line of the Grand Duchy of Baden State Railway.

== Development ==
The Actiengesellschaft für Bahn-Bau und Betrieb (BBB) company was founded in Frankfurt am Main on 18 January 1898.

On 7 May 1898 a request was made to the Lord Mayor of Wiesloch for assistance in obtaining permission to build the line. Permission was obtained on 6 June 1900, with the voltage limited to 530 volts.

In 1905 the railway was purchased by the Heidelberger Straßen- und Bergbahn (HSB), bringing the route under the control of the City of Heidelberg, for incorporation into the Heidelberg Tramway system.
