= Heppenheim =

Town in Hesse, Germany

- Town
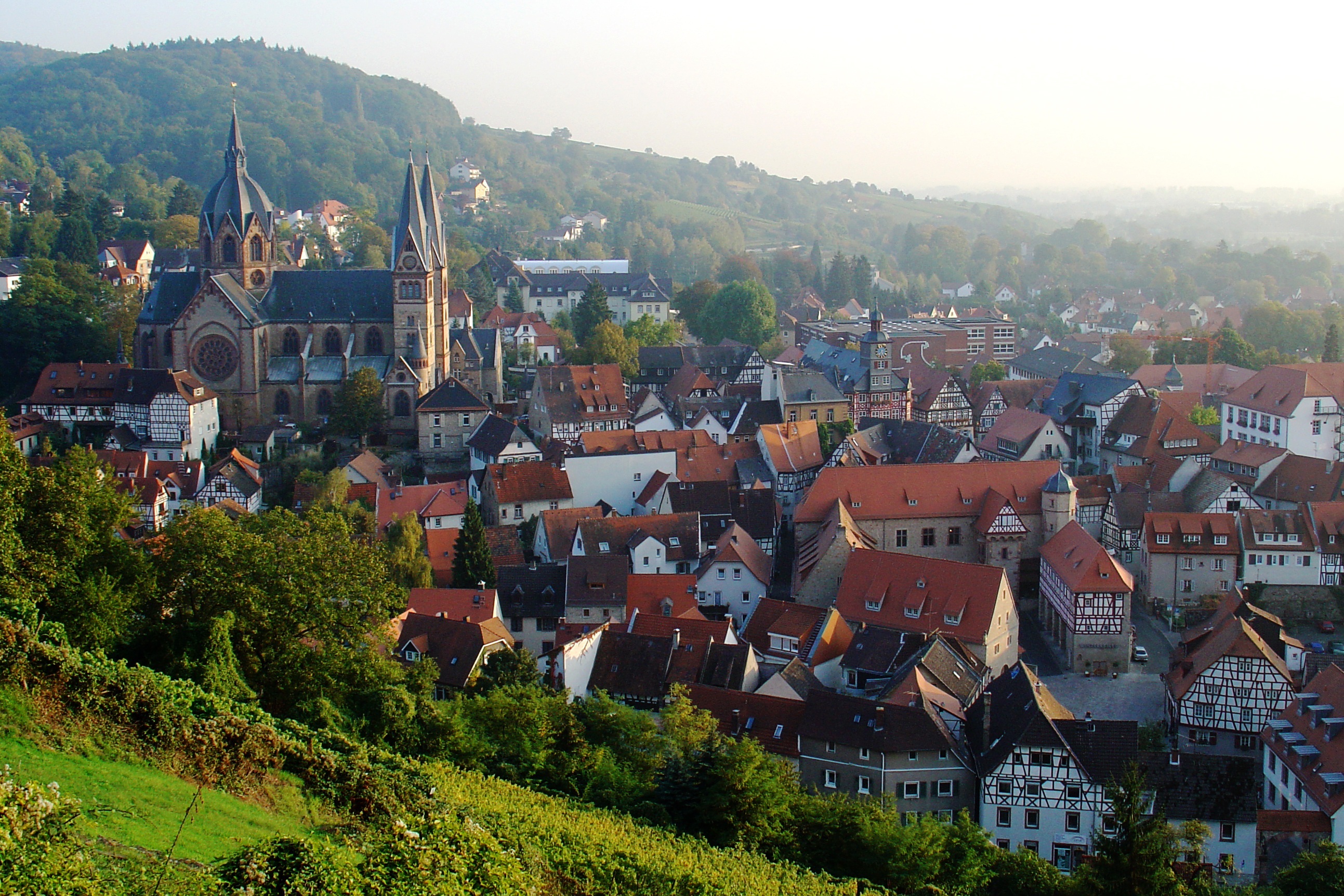
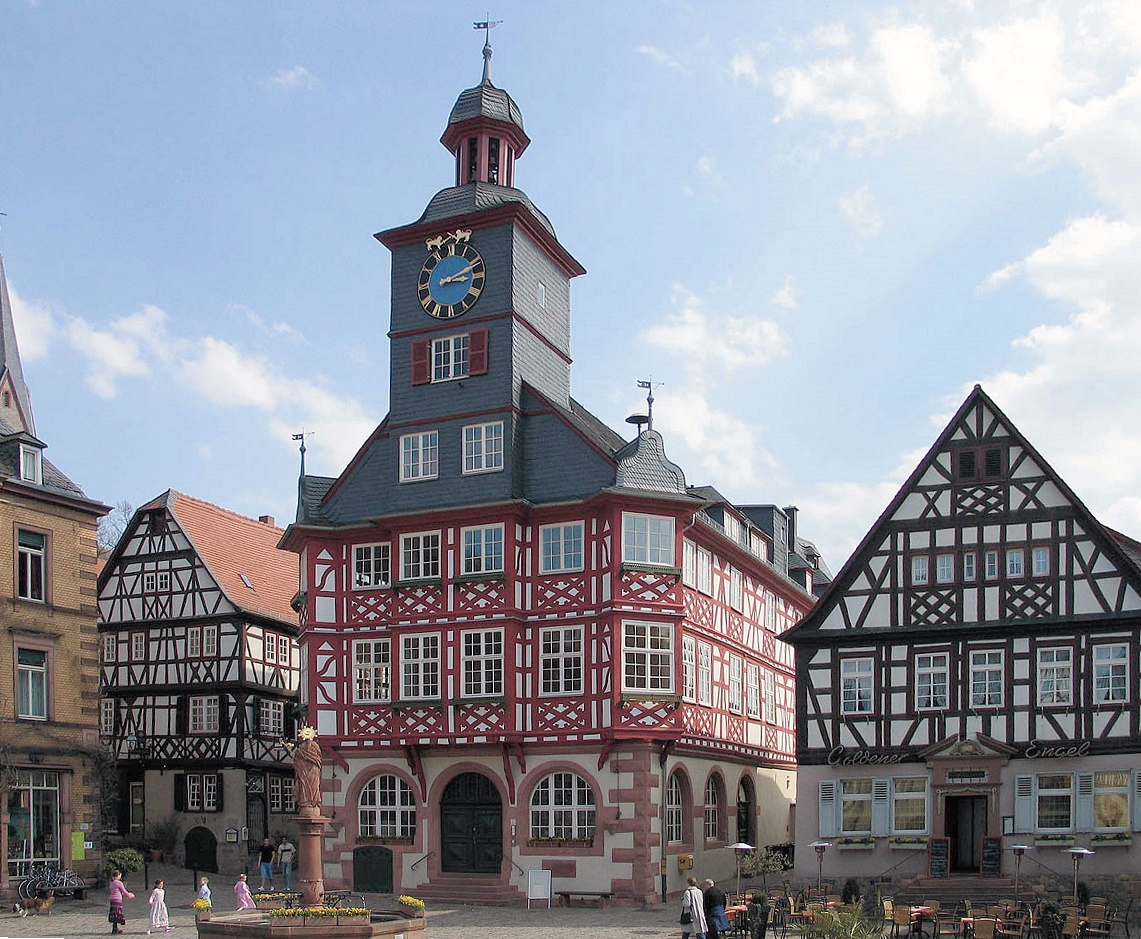
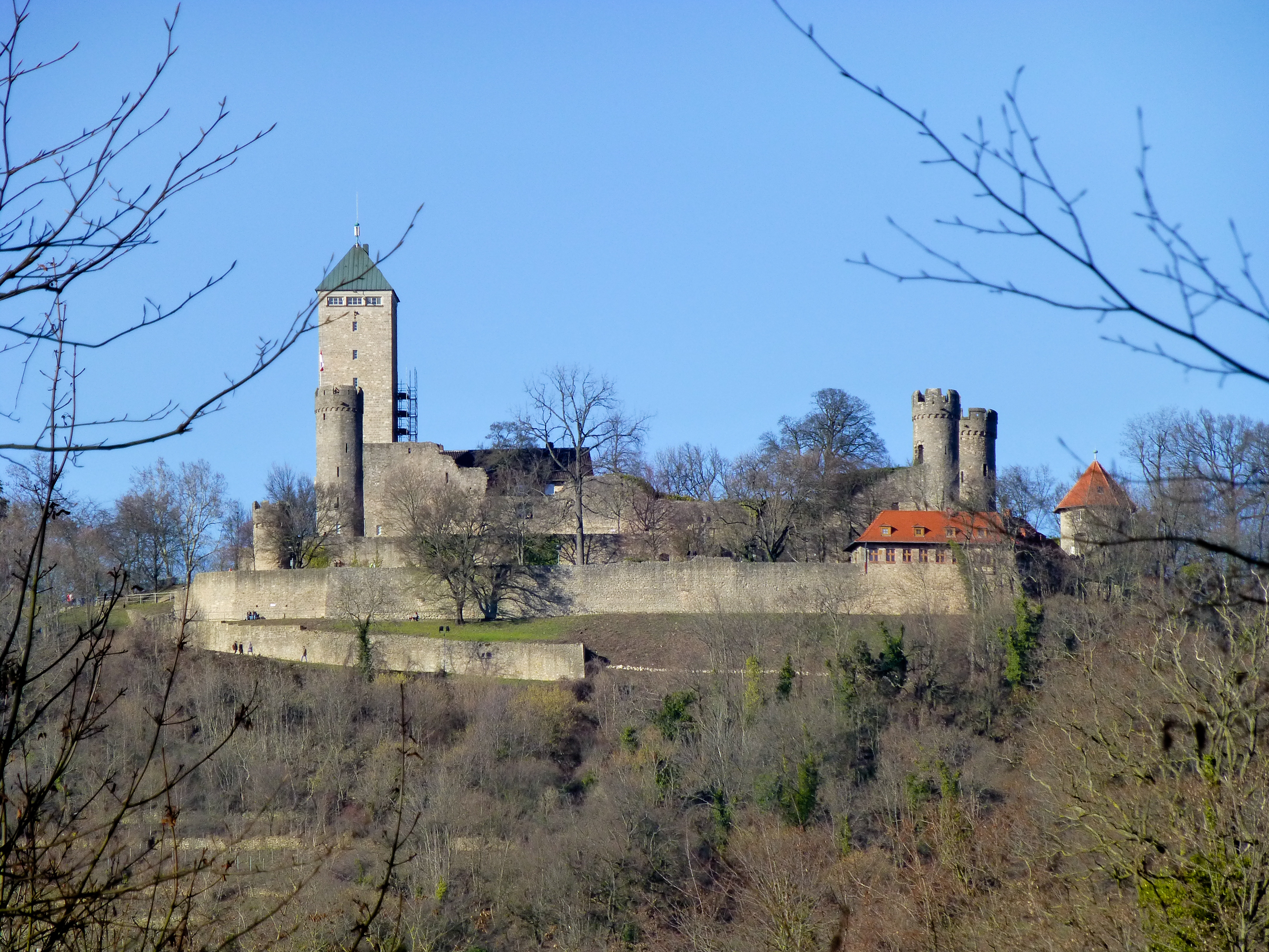
- Cathedral and old town Town Hall on the Marketplace Starkenburg

- Coat of arms

- Location of Heppenheim within Bergstraße district
- Interactive map of Heppenheim
- Location within Germany Location within Hesse
- Coordinates: 49°38′35″N 8°38′20″E
- Country: Germany
- State: Hesse
- Admin. region: Darmstadt
- District: Bergstraße

Government
  - Mayor (2023–29): Rainer Burelbach (CDU)

Area
  - Total: 52.12 km^{2} (20.12 sq mi)
- Elevation: 122 m (400 ft)

Population (2025-12-31)
  - Total: 28,031
  - Density: 537.8/km^{2} (1,393/sq mi)
- Time zone: UTC+01:00 (CET)
  - Summer (DST): UTC+02:00 (CEST)
- Postal codes: 64646
- Dialling codes: 06252, 06253 (part of Unter-Hambach, Mittershausen-Scheuerberg)
- Vehicle registration: HP
- Website: www.heppenheim.de

Heppenheim (Bergstraße) (German pronunciation: [ˈhɛpn̩ˌhaɪm]) is the seat of Bergstraße district in Hesse, Germany, lying on the Bergstraße on the edge of the Odenwald. It is best known for being the birthplace of Sebastian Vettel, a four-time Formula One World Champion and the place of founding of the Free Democratic Party (Germany).

== Geography ==
=== Location ===
The town is set on the vineyards below the mediaeval Starkenburg (castle). Defining for the townscape, besides the castle, is St. Peter, the “Cathedral of the Bergstraße” as the big Catholic church is known locally; it was consecrated on 1 August 1904, and is not a bishop's seat. Heppenheim lies centrally on Bundesstraßen 3 and 460, and Autobahn A 5/A 67, almost halfway between Heidelberg and Darmstadt, in southern Hesse on the boundary with Baden-Württemberg, and is Hesse's southernmost district seat.

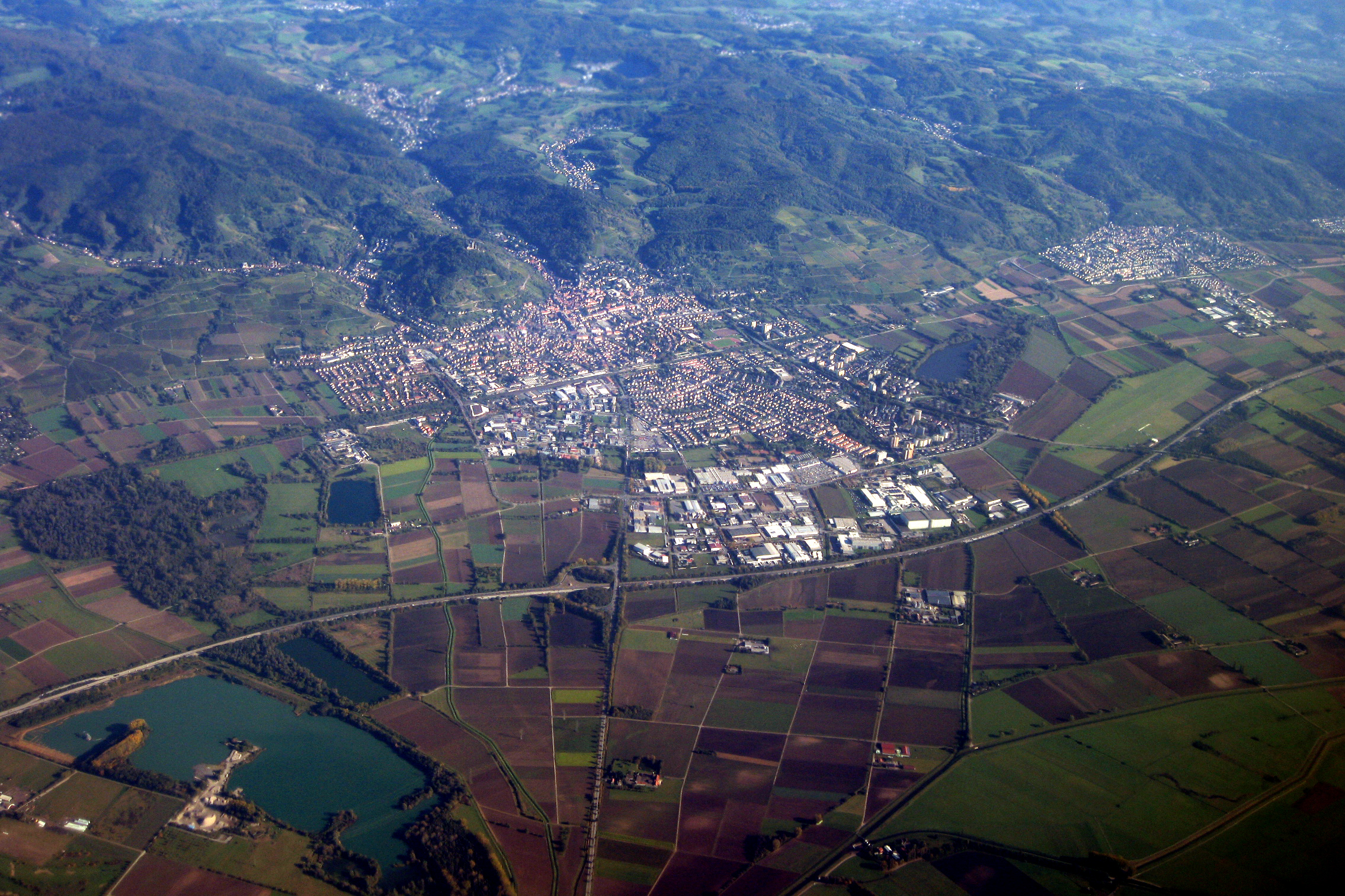
Aerial photograph

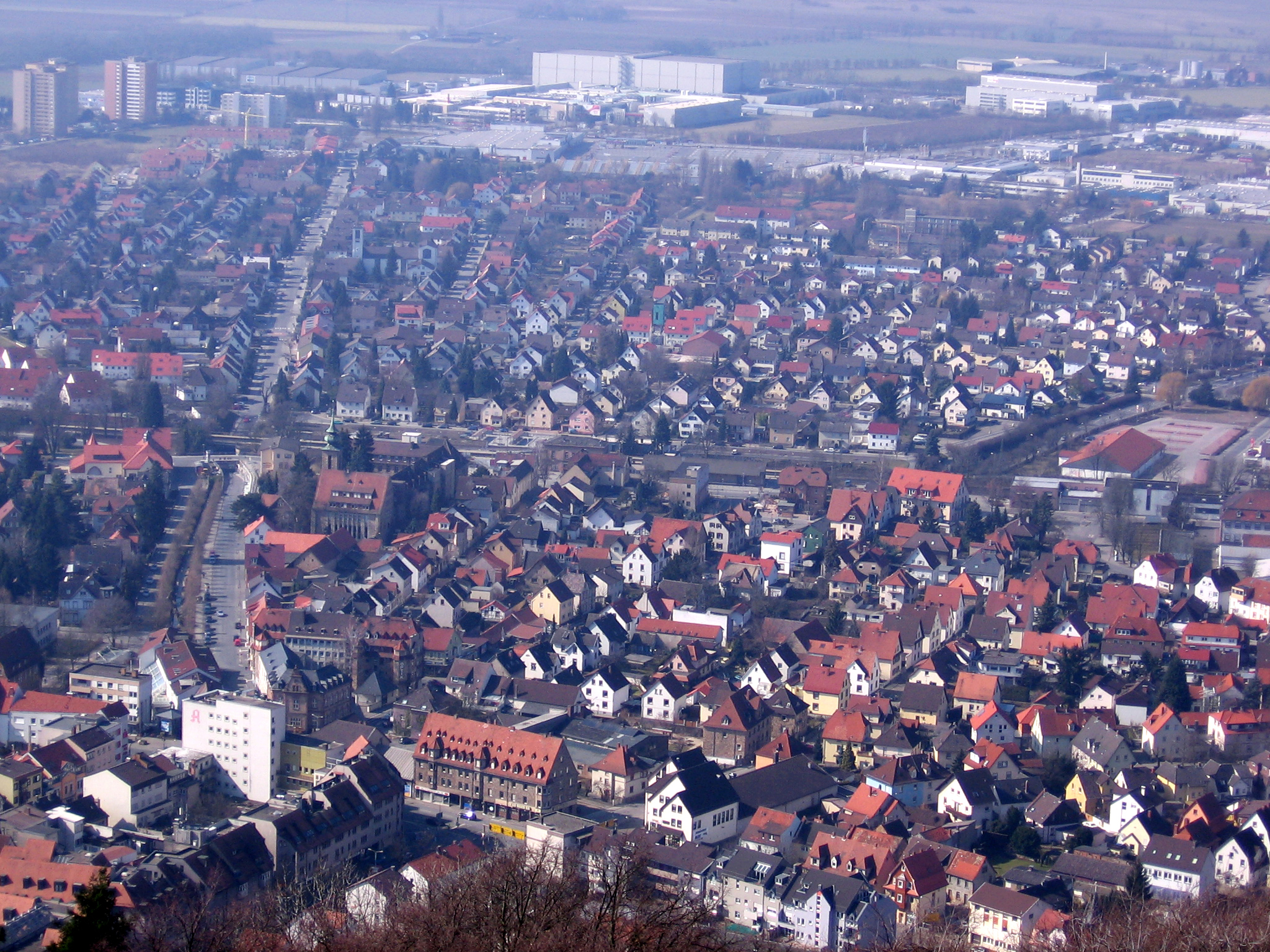
Heppenheim seen from the Starkenburg castle

The town's official designation is “Heppenheim an der Bergstraße”. In the local Hessian German dialect, the town is also called Hepprum.

Heppenheim´s biggest lake is the Bruchsee. Multiple streams such as the Hambach, Stadtbach, Erbach und Brombach flow from the east and down the valleys of the Odenwald into the Weschnitz, the town's western border.

“Bergstraße” is not only the name given the road running from Darmstadt to Heidelberg on the western edge of the Odenwald and eastern edge of the Rhine rift (now Bundesstraße 3), but also one given the landscape along the road. It stands out with its unusually mild and sunny climate in which trees blossom especially early.

In the area around the outlying centre of Ober-Laudenbach is a boundary oddity unique in Hesse: just there within the town's municipal area are two enclaves belonging to Baden-Württemberg, within one of which is a further enclave belonging to Hesse.

=== Neighbouring communities ===
Heppenheim borders in the north on the town of Bensheim, in the northeast on the community of Lautertal and the town of Lindenfels, in the east on the communities of Fürth, Rimbach, Mörlenbach and Birkenau, in the south on the community of Laudenbach (Rhein-Neckar-Kreis, Baden-Württemberg), in the southwest on the towns of Viernheim and Lampertheim and in the west on the town of Lorsch.

=== Constituent communities ===
Besides the main town, Heppenheim has the outlying centres of Unter-Hambach, Ober-Hambach, Kirschhausen (with Igelsbach), Erbach, Sonderbach, Wald-Erlenbach, Mittershausen-Scheuerberg, and Ober-Laudenbach, which were in the course of municipal reform in Hesse amalgamated with Heppenheim with effect from 1 January 1972.

== History ==
In 755, Heppenheim had its first documentary mention. At that time, the town was the hub of a Frankish domain. In 773, this area became one of Charlemagne’s donations to the Lorsch Abbey, and to protect it, the castle (Starkenburg) was built above it in 1065; in 1066 it successfully resisted a siege by Prince-Archbishop Adalbert of Hamburg-Bremen. The Imperial Abbey held the rank of principality, and Heppenheim developed over time into the territory's administrative and economic hub, although it lost its importance with the Abbey's downfall in the 11th and 12th centuries. In 1229, Emperor Friedrich II put the Starkenburg under the administration of the Archbishops of Electoral Mainz, doing likewise with the Lorsch Abbey along with Heppenheim in 1232. But for an interruption from 1461 to 1623 when the fief was pledged to the Electorate of the Palatinate, Heppenheim remained an Electoral Mainz holding right up until the Reichsdeputationshauptschluss in 1803. Then it became Hessian, first part of the Landgraviate of Hesse-Darmstadt, and since 1948 it has been part of the Bundesland of Hesse.

Heppenheim has had town rights since at least 1318, and market rights, it is believed, already by the early 9th century. From 1265 (possibly earlier) until 1803, Heppenheim was the seat of the Electoral Mainz Amt (Oberamt) of Starkenburg. Once it passed to Hesse-Darmstadt, the Amt was abolished. Heppenheim was thereafter first the seat of a (much smaller) Amt, and then, as of 1821 the seat of the Heppenheim Administrative Region (Landratsbezirk). As of 1832 it was the seat of the Heppenheim district. Since then, it was between 1848 and 1852 the seat of the Regierungsbezirk of Heppenheim, and has been since 1938 the seat of the Bergstraße district, to which were assigned not only the old Heppenheim district, but also great parts of the likewise abolished Bensheim district, with the parts of the Worms district on the Rhine’s right bank being added after the Second World War.

In both 1369 and 1693 (in the latter case owing to the devastation wrought by the French in the Nine Years' War), Heppenheim was almost utterly destroyed in town fires. The town came through both world wars unscathed, aside from slight damage when the Americans marched in March 1945.

Heppenheim suffered severely in the Thirty Years' War (1618–48); the Starkenburg was overwhelmed by Spanish troops in 1621, and by the Swedes in 1630. The Plague killed about 80% of the population in 1635 (almost 100% in the outlying countryside), and the town was sacked by the Poles in 1636 and again in 1645 by the French.

The Heppenheim Conference (Heppenheimer Tagung), a meeting of leading liberals on 10 October 1847 in the Halber Mond (“Half Moon”) Hotel, was a prelude to the German Revolution in 1848 and 1849. Given this historical connection, the Free Democratic Party (FDP, Freie Demokratische Partei) was founded on 11 December 1948 in Heppenheim.

There were Jews living in Heppenheim by the Middle Ages. The town was part of the Archbishopric of Mainz from 1232 to 1803 and there were repeated ecclesiastical measures undertaken to persecute Jews. Jewish life in the town was wiped out during the persecution that accompanied the Plague in 1348 and 1349. The modern community was founded in the 17th century. About 1900, there were some 40 Jewish families, with 200 to 300 people living in town. That figure fell to 113 people by 1933, a result of migration and emigration.

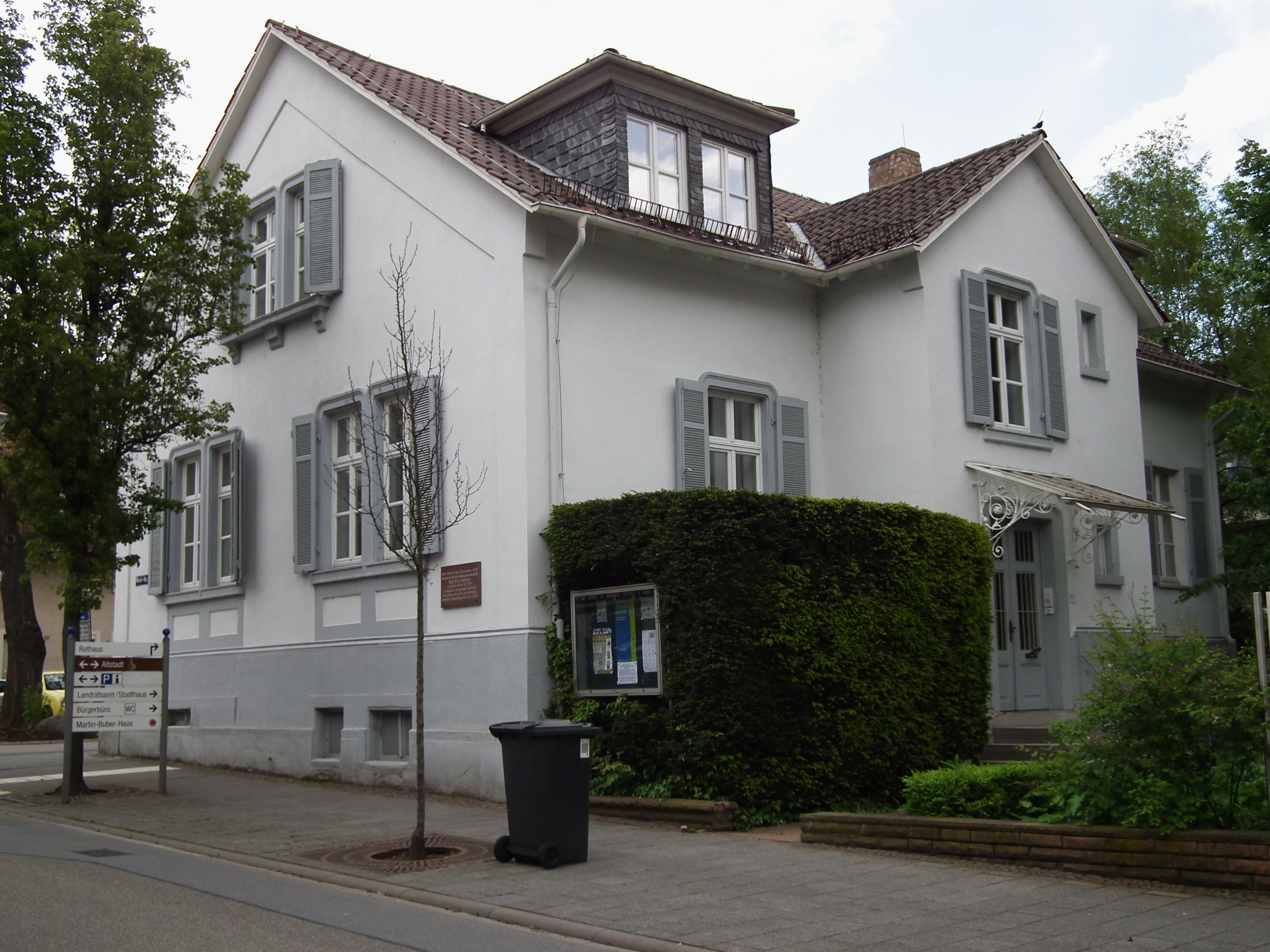
Martin Buber's house (1916–38) in Heppenheim, Germany. Now the headquarters of the International Council of Christians and Jews.

Martin Buber, Zionist and honorary professor of religious sciences at the University of Frankfurt am Main, is the best known Jewish inhabitant of Heppenheim where he settled in 1916. In February 1938, he left the country and emigrated with his family to Jerusalem. On 9 November 1938, Kristallnacht, Buber's house was looted and his 3,000-volume library was destroyed. In May 1939, there were still 37 Jews in Heppenheim, but in September 1942, the last few Jewish residents were deported. The former synagogue's location, now a memorial, has stone marking the perimeter of the synagogue destroyed in 1938. A plaque bears the inscription, Hier stand die 1900 erbaute und 1938 zerstörte Synagoge. (“Site of the synagogue, built in 1900 and destroyed in 1938.”). An additional plaque with the title Im Gedenken an die Ermordeten (“In memory of the murdered”) lists the names of 29 former Heppenheim Jews. The psychiatric institution in Heppenheim took part in the Nazi “euthanasia” crimes, and was also a “collection facility,” where Jewish psychiatric patients were sent on the way to the gas chamber.

Beginning on 28 May 1942, a subcamp of Dachau/Natzweiler-Struthof concentration camp was located in Heppenheim. It was closed on 18 December 1942, but opened again as Heppenheim subcamp on 15 June 1943. It was permanently closed on 27 March 1945 when the town was occupied by American troops at the end of the fighting in Hesse. The prisoners in Heppenheim were put to work in the SS institution Deutsche Versuchsanstalt für Ernährung und Verpflegung.

In 1955, the town celebrated its 1,200th anniversary and opened the new open-air stage "Freilichtbühne". It is still in use today, seats around 2500 people and also proved its worth at the Hessentag 2004.

In 2004, the town hosted the 44th Hessentag state festival.

== Population development ==
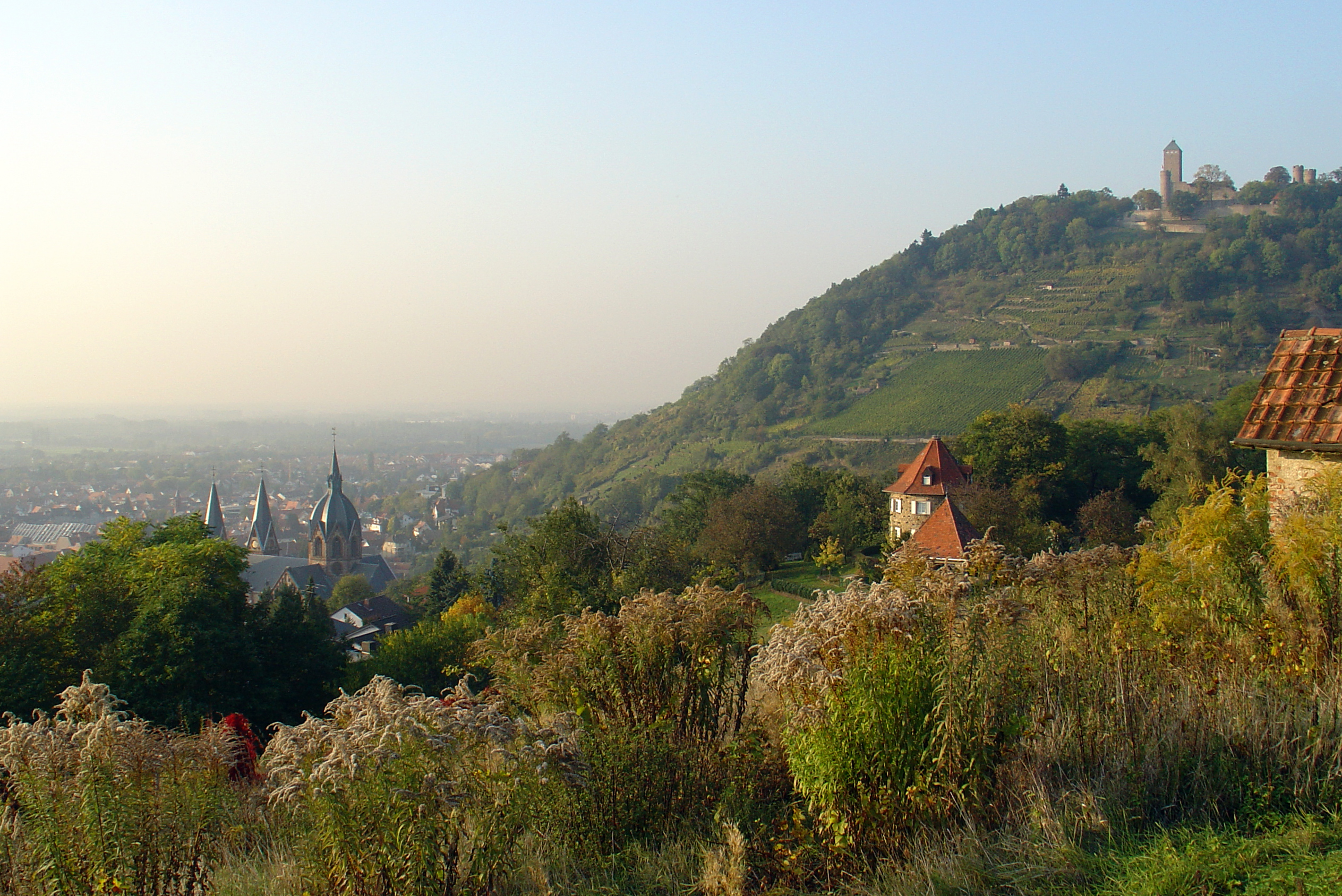
”Cathedral” and Starkenburg (view from Maiberg)

Year	Inhabitants
1666	1,066
1806	3,190
1861	4,599
1900	5,779
1925	7,693
1939	9,350
1950	13,111
1971	17,411
1975	23,793
2003	25,457
2008	26,792
2013	25,013
2022	26.946

The sharp rise between 1971 and 1975 has to do with the amalgamations in the course of administrative reform in Hesse in 1972.

== Politics ==
In 1948 the Free Democratic Party was founded in Heppenheim. Furthermore, the liberal Heppenheimer Versammlung was one of the starting points of the German revolutions of 1848–1849.

=== Town council ===
The municipal election held on March 15, 2026 concluded with the following results:

Parties and voter communities		% 2026	Seats 2026	% 2021	Seats 2021
CDU	Christian Democratic Union of Germany	37.4	14	38.7	14
GRÜNE	Alliance 90/The Greens	17	6	19.8	7
SPD	Social Democratic Party of Germany	16.2	6	16.3	6
FDP	Free Democratic Party	10.7	4	9.7	4
FWH	Freie Wähler	6.7	2	5.4	2
TIERSCHUTZ	Tierschutzpartei	6.01	2	7	2
LINKE	Die Linke/The Left Party	4.3	2	1.1	1
WG LIZ	Life in the Center	1.7	1	2.1	1
Total		100.0	37	100.0	37
Voter turnout in %		55.05		52.05	

=== Mayors ===
In the runoff election on 10 April 2005, Gerhard Herbert (SPD) defeated the incumbent Ulrich Obermayr (CDU). Herbert took over the mayor's office on 1 September 2005 from Obermayr, who had held it for 18 years. In 2011 Rainer Burelbach (* 1965) (CDU) was elected mayor with 55,6 % of the votes. Burelbach was reelected in 2017 and 2023.

The following mayors have held office in Heppenheim since the municipal constitution was promulgated in 1821:

Time in office	Mayor
1821–1842	Gottfried Piersch
1843–1852	Georg Neff
1853–1863	Gottfried Piersch
1864–1869	Georg Hamel
1870–1874	Johann Friedrich Weis
1874–1887	Lorenz Keßler
1887–1910	Wilhelm Höhn
1910–1913	Ludwig Lorenz Kohl
1914–1924	Anton Philipp Wiegand
1925–1937	Dr. Karl Schiffers (Centre Party (Germany)/NSDAP)^{1}
1937–1945	Dr. Walter Köhler (NSDAP)^{2}
1945	Dr. Gustav König^{3}
1945–1946	Jakob Fleck (SPD)^{3}
1946–1948	Karl Hagen (CDU)
1948–1954	Otto Holzamer (FDP)
1954–1973	Wilhelm Metzendorf (independent)
1973–1987	Hans Kunz (CDU)
1987–2005	Ulrich Obermayr (CDU)
2005–2011	Gerhard Herbert (SPD)
since 1 September 2011	Rainer Burelbach (CDU)

^{1}Dr. Schiffers switched to the NSDAP to keep abreast of changes, but he soon ran into difficulties with the Party and thereby lost his office in 1937.
^{2}Dr. Köhler was in the mayor's office only until 1941 when he was called into the Wehrmacht. His duties were performed by deputy Franz Keil during his absence. Despite party membership, Dr. Köhler is said not to have been a fanatical Nazi, but rather a respectable mayor.
^{3}Dr. König and Jakob Fleck were each provisionally appointed mayor after the Americans marched in 1945.

Since 1924, beginning with Karl Schiffers's time in office, the office of mayor has been executed by a professional mayor.

Among all the mayors, Wilhelm Höhn, Karl Schiffers and Wilhelm Metzendorf stand out as ones who decisively promoted the town.

=== Coat of arms ===
The town's arms are charged with the Lion of Hesse above the parting, striped as always horizontally in silver and red, but in these arms also holding a golden-hilted, silver-bladed sword in his right paw and wearing a golden crown. The part of the field below the parting at the fess line is itself parted per pale (vertically down the middle). On the dexter side (armsbearer's right, viewer's left) is the Lorsch Abbey's cross pattée fitchy (that is, cross with “flattened” ends to three of the arms, and a point on the bottom one) on a silver field. On the sinister side (armsbearer's left, viewer's right) is the silver six-spoked wheel of Mainz on a red field.

The arms, bestowed on the town on 30 August 1913 by Grand Duke Ernest Louis of Hesse, symbolize the town's historical allegiances (a Lorsch holding from 773 to 1232, a Mainz holding until 1803, and after that Hessian), but without any reference to the town's time with the Electorate of the Palatinate, which from 1461 to 1623 held it from Mainz as a pledge. The old, historical coat of arms showed a sitting bishop, symbolizing Electoral Mainz's hegemony.

== Twin towns – sister cities ==
Heppenheim is twinned with:

- Kaltern an der Weinstraße, Italy (1971)
- Le Chesnay, France (1975)
- West Bend, United States (2004)

=== Sponsorship ===
Since 1956, together with the town of Bubenreuth, there has been a sponsorship arrangement with regard to Luby, formerly Schönbach in the district of Eger in the Sudetenland (now in the Czech Republic).

== Culture and sightseeing ==
=== Sightseeing ===
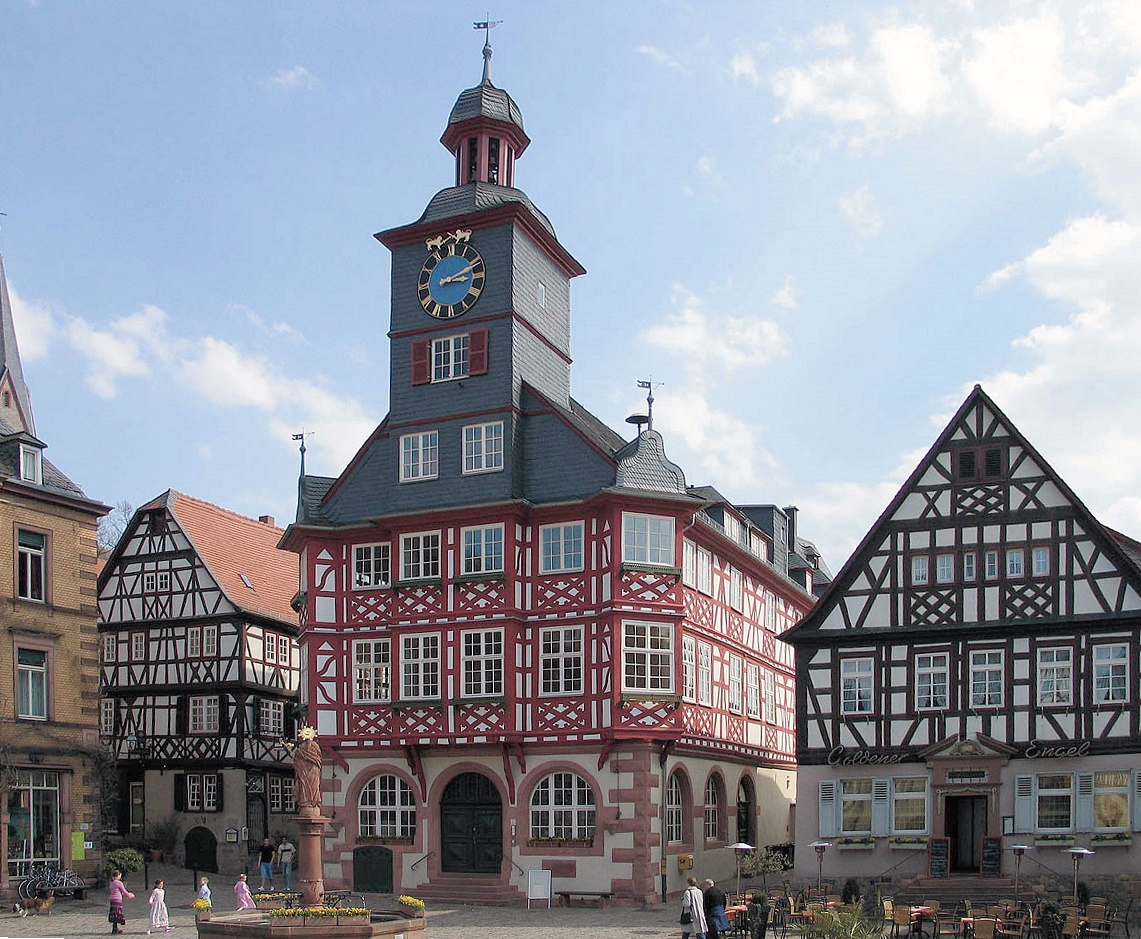
Town Hall on the Marketplace

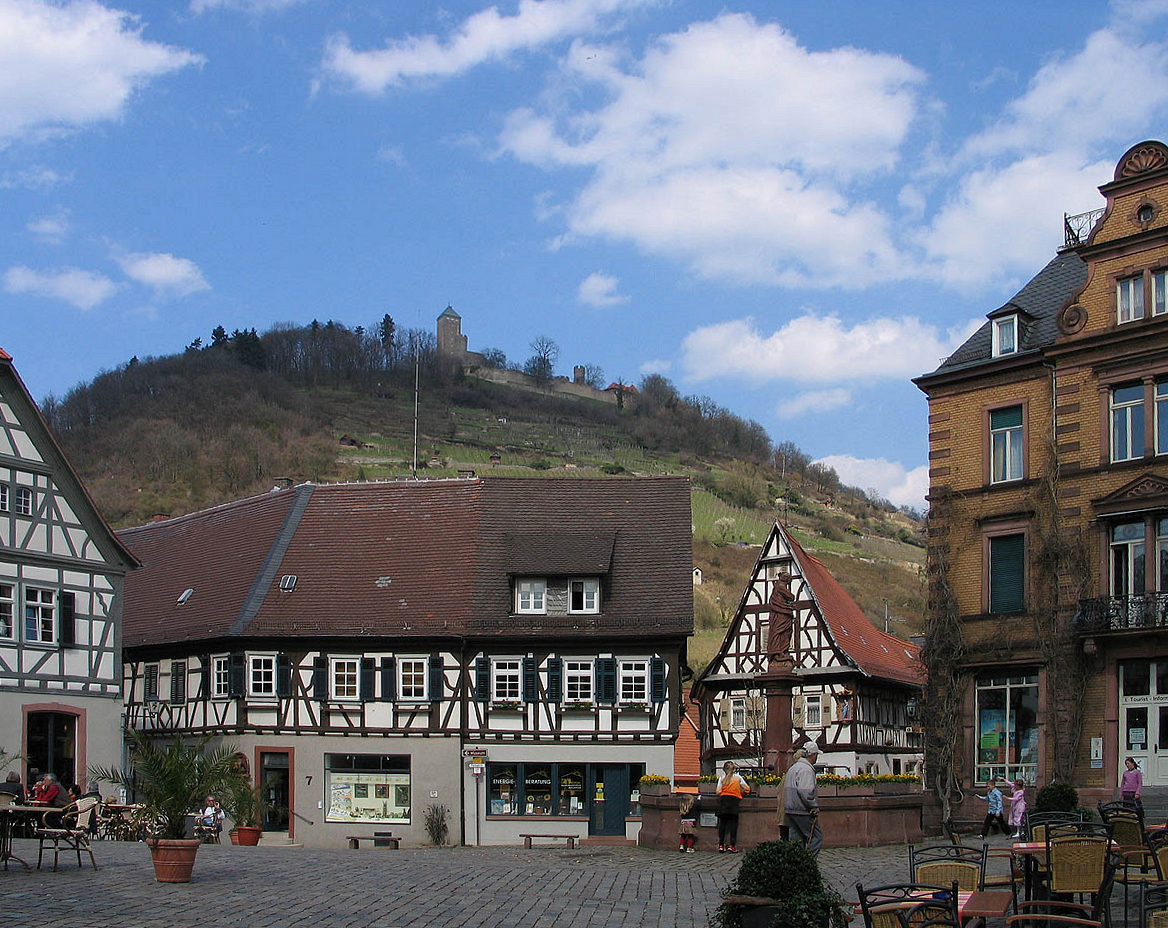
Marketplace and Starkenburg in the background

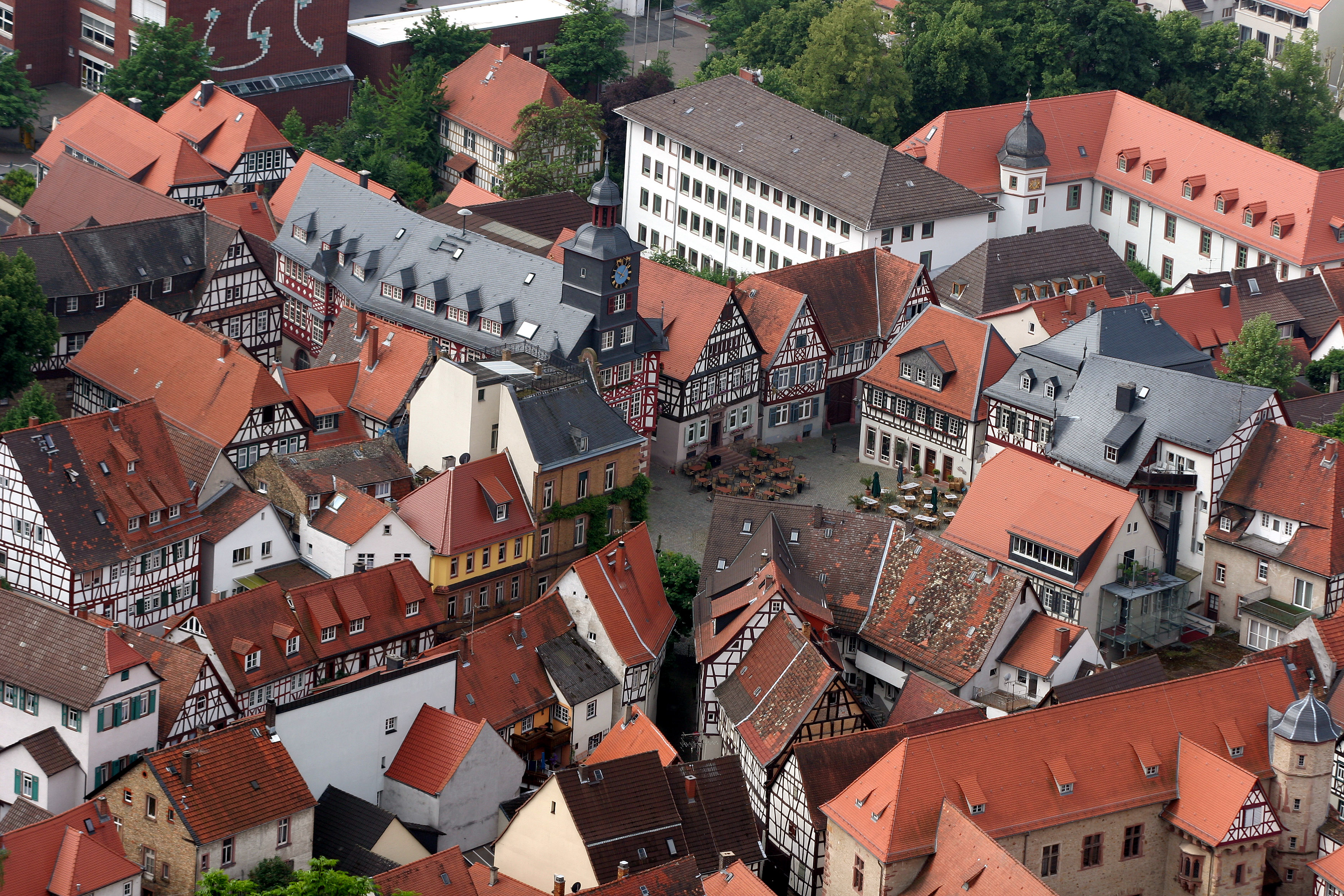
The centre of Heppenheim's Old Town seen from the Starkenburg

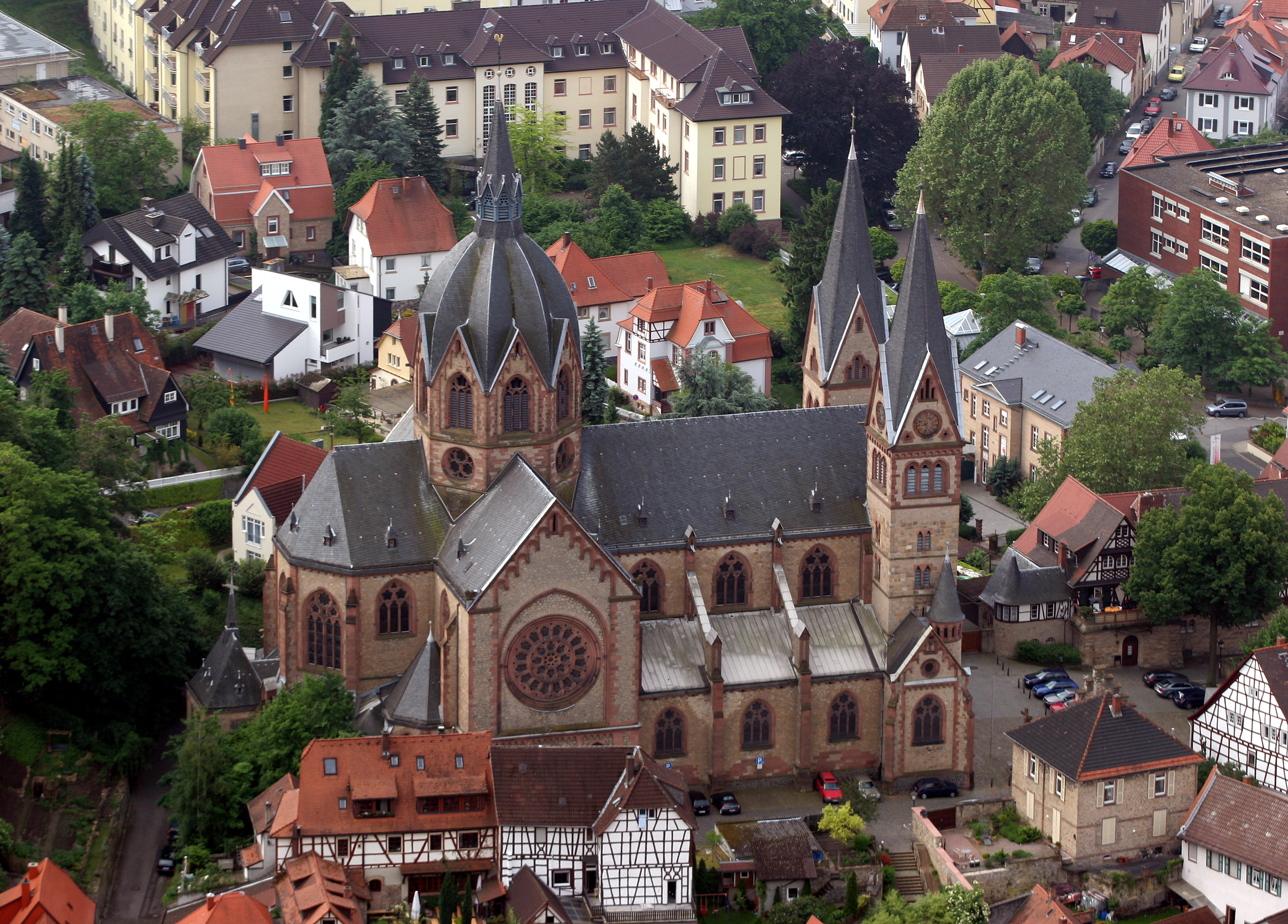
The “Cathedral of the Bergstraße”, St. Peter's Church

Heppenheim has (as at 30 April 2008) 408 cultural monuments that are under monumental protection. The following is a selection:

- Marketplace with Town Hall, timber-frame houses and Marienbrunnen (fountain)
- Starkenburg (castle) on the Schlossberg (mountain)
- Catholic Parish Church of St. Peter (“Cathedral of the Bergstraße”)
- Electoral Mainz Amtshof
- Former power station built in 1899 in Gothic Revival style
- Open-air stage, built in 1955 on the Kappel, on the occasion of the 1,200-year jubilee

Heppenheim has at its disposal a largely preserved, self-contained, picturesque Old Town core with an area of about 8 ha, within which are found all the sights mentioned in the foregoing list(except Starkenburg). The Old Town is characterized by timber-frame houses dating back mostly to the reconstruction in the early decades after Heppenheim's destruction in the Nine Years' War in 1693, which was done over the remains of the medieval town. Of the town wall, however, which was largely knocked down in the early 19th century, little remains.

=== Regular events ===
Important yearly events are:

- Heppenheimer Festspiele (festival, daily from mid to late July to early September)
- Bergsträßer Weinmarkt (wine market, late June)
- Internationales Weinmarkt-Stockschießturnier (international wine market and ice stock sport tournament, second weekend during wine market)
- Internationales Straßentheater beim Festival Gassensensationen (Street theatre, early July)
- Fastnachtsumzug (Carnival parade)
- Ferienspiele für Kinder von Vorschule bis 16 Jahren (children's summer holiday games, preschool to 16)
- Kirchweih (church consecration festival, first weekend in August)
- Easter Market, each year on Maundy Thursday in the pedestrian zone of Heppenheim
- Regular events by Forum Kultur

=== Starkenburg Observatory ===
The Starkenburg-Sternwarte, an amateur observatory on the Schlossberg near the Starkenburg, has made a name for itself nationally in minor planet research.

=== Museums and cultural institutions ===
- Museum für Stadtgeschichte und Volkskunde (town history and folklore)
- Musikschule (musical school)
- Konservatorium (conservatoire)
- “Theater im Hof” of the “Festspiele Heppenheim GmbH” (organizer of the Heppenheimer Festspiele)
- Kreisvolkshochschule (district folk high school)
- Haus am Maiberg (political and social training centre of the Diocese of Mainz)

=== Clubs in Heppenheim ===
- FC Starkenburgia 1900 e. V. Heppenheim, one of Germany's oldest football clubs, founded in the same year as the German Football Federation
- FC Sportfreunde Heppenheim e. V.
- REC Heppenheim e. V.; ice stock sport
- HC VfL Heppenheim; team handball
- WSV-BL; water sports
- BC Heppenheim (Badminton Club Heppenheim)
- Verkehrs- und Heimatverein e.V.; transport and local history
- SV Erbach; sport club
- Aero-Club Heppenheim Kreis Bergstraße e.V.; flying club at the Heppenheim airfield that flies both sailplanes and motorplanes

== Economy and infrastructure ==
Heppenheim is part of the economically strong Rhine Neckar Area, as well as the Rhein-Main area. Together with various neighbouring towns and communities (among others Bensheim, Lorsch and Lautertal), Heppenheim is identified as a middle centre in the South Hesse Regional Plan.

The town has in its favour good economic data – even in relation to the Rhine Neckar Area's and the Starkenburg Region's as a whole – above-average employment figures and an especially high proportion of graduates in the resident population's above-average buying power.

=== Transport ===
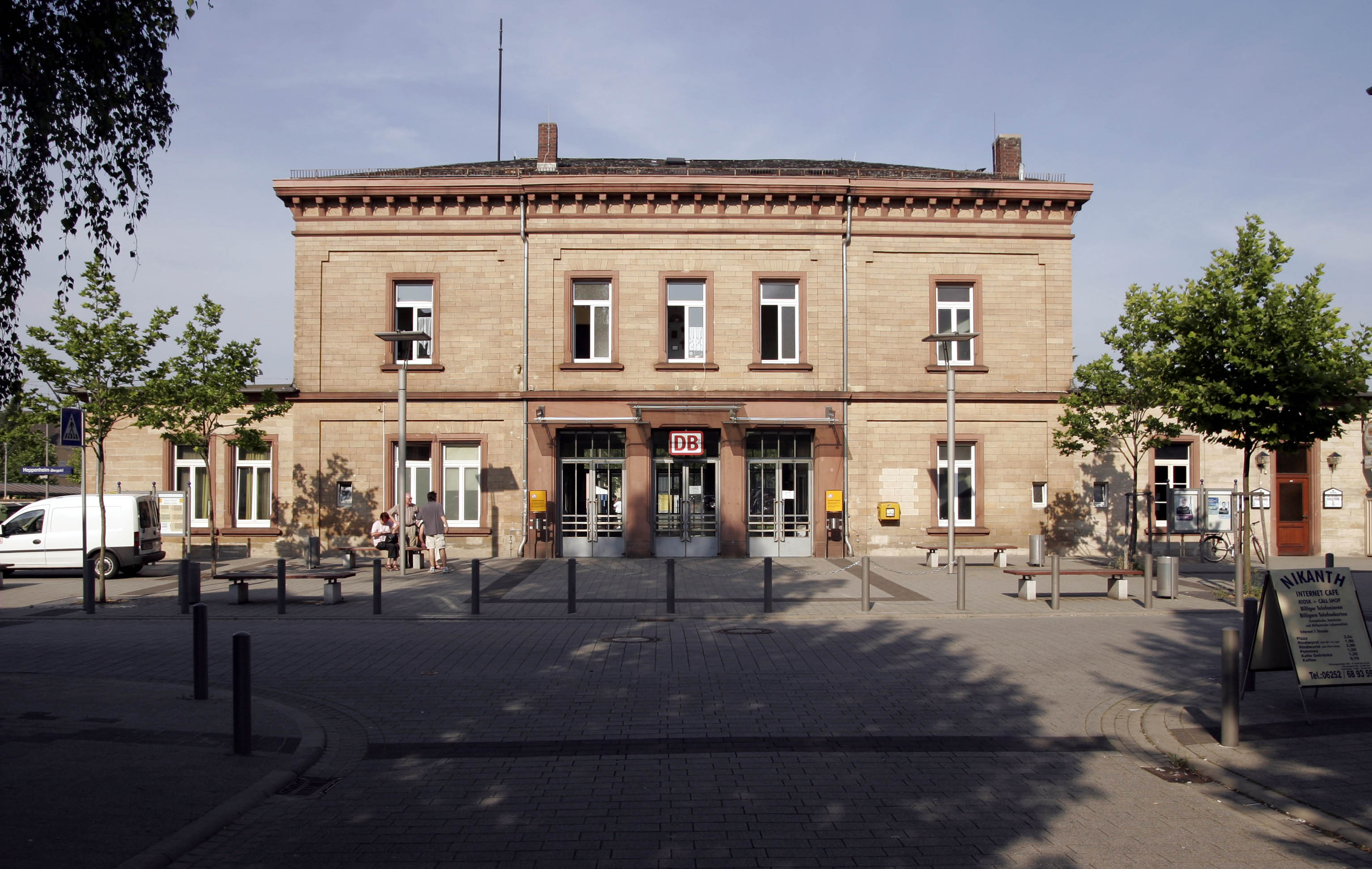
Heppenheim railway station in June 2007

Heppenheim is linked by several buslines to Jugenheim, Grasellenbach and Mörlenbach. Heppenheim station is found in the town centre, and the two-track Main-Neckar Railway links the town to Heidelberg and Frankfurt am Main.

=== Industry ===
In 1899, one of Europe's first power stations was built in Heppenheim. Two steam engines furnished electricity beginning in 1900 for Heppenheim and Bensheim. After the Second World War, many industrial operations settled in town, from such fields as machine building (KLN Ultraschall AG), mining (Granitwerke Röhrig in the outlying centre of Sonderbach), textile and food production (among others, a great Langnese-Iglo GmbHproduction plant) and the analytical industry (WICOM). The Unilever Heppenheim ice-cream plant is the largest in Europe, with Unilever Gloucester the next largest plant.

This array of businesses was also later filled out by further ones from the fields of logistics, marketing and services. On Bundesstraße 3, near the state boundary, the mineral spring business Odenwald-Quelle has been running since 1932.

=== Winegrowing ===
Heppenheim is a winegrowing town belonging to the Hessische Bergstraße wine region. With some 450 ha of vineyards it was originally Germany's smallest self-contained wine region (but since Reunification it has been the second smallest). Two hundred and thirty hectares alone – roughly half – can be found in Heppenheim and its two outlying centres of Hambach and Erbach. They are marketed under the banner name “Heppenheimer Schlossberg” with the individual designations Centgericht, Stemmler, Steinkopf, Schlossberg, Maiberg and Eckweg (until 2004 there was also Guldenzoll).

Owing to the especially favourable climate and good soil conditions on the Bergstraße, mainly dry and dryish wines of very high quality are made here. The main variety is Riesling. The biggest producer is the Bergsträßer Winzer eG cooperative, with its seat in Heppenheim, which also owns Hesse's biggest wine cellar. The Bergsträßer Staatsweingut (“state wine estate”) with its seat in Bensheim maintains the Hessischer Rebmuttergarten (“Vineyard Mother Garden”), formerly a vineyard cultivation facility whose goal was to fight the phylloxera, introduced from North America but only cropping up on the Bergstraße itself in 2005, by grafting phylloxera-proof hybrid rootstocks onto vines of nobler varieties. At the Bergsträßer Winzer eG begins the 6.9 km-long Erlebnispfad Wein und Stein (“Wine and Stone Adventure Path”), which runs through the vineyards with 30 stations.

=== Education ===
The Odenwaldschule, once Germany's oldest comprehensive school, was in the Ober-Hambach section of Heppenheim. It was founded by Edith and Paul Geheeb in 1910 and was based on their concept of holistic education reform, integrating work of the head and hand. The boarding school used to have up to 250 pupils. After a scandal about sexual abuse cases in the 1970s and 1980s and attempts to save the institution, it was closed in 2015. There are plans for renovating the location. Heppenheim is also home to the European Hotel Academy.

== Notable people ==
- Marianne Cope (1838–1918), nun, canonized
- Judith Buber Agassi (1924–2018), sociologist
- Horst Antes (born 1936), painter
- Jürgen W. Falter (born 1944), political scientist
- Franz Lambert (born 1948), musician, composer and organist
- Jürgen Groh (born 1956), footballer
- Erwin Schwab (born 1964), discoverer of numerous minor planets
- Thomas Zipp (1966–2026), artist
- Mai Thi Nguyen-Kim (born 1987), chemist and science communicator
- Sebastian Vettel (born 1987), 4-time Formula One world champion
- Fabian Vettel (born 1998), racing driver

=== Associated with the town ===
- Martin Buber, Jewish religious philosopher, lived here from 1916 to 1938
- Justus von Liebig, chemist, 10-month teaching stint in Heppenheim (1818/19)
- Hans Baumgartner, long jumper, Olympic medalist
- Bernhard Trares, football player and manager
