= Hirschberg an der Bergstraße =

- Municipality
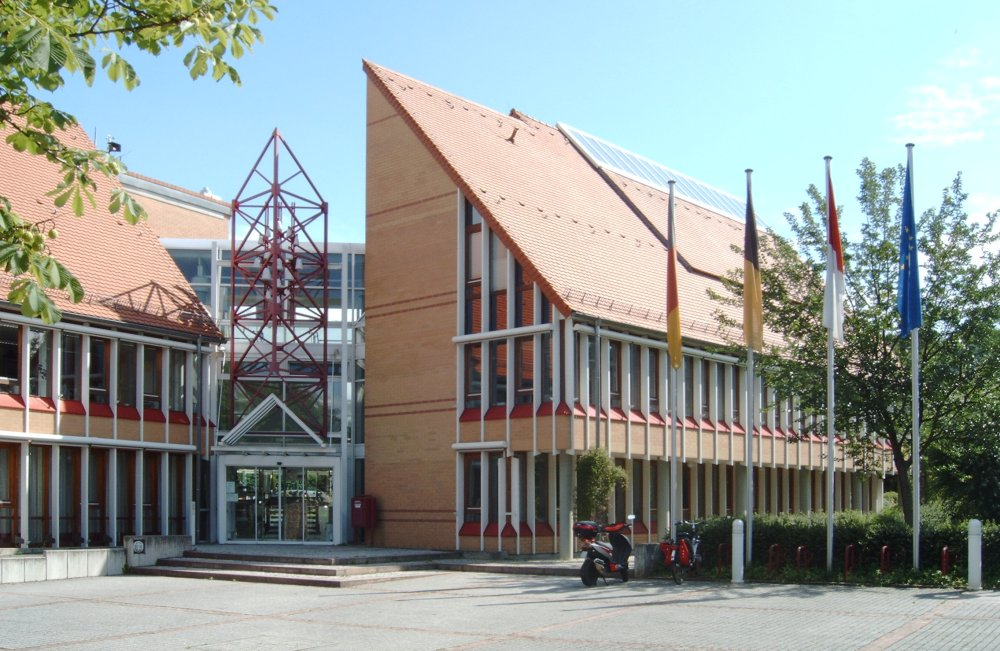
- Town hall

- Coat of arms

- Location of Hirschberg an der Bergstraße within Rhein-Neckar-Kreis district
- Interactive map of Hirschberg an der Bergstraße
- Location within Germany Location within Baden-Württemberg
- Coordinates: 49°29′58″N 08°39′44″E
- Country: Germany
- State: Baden-Württemberg
- Admin. region: Karlsruhe
- District: Rhein-Neckar-Kreis
- Subdivisions: 2 Ortsteile

Government
  - Mayor (2019–27): Ralf Gänshirt (Ind.)

Area
  - Total: 12.35 km^{2} (4.77 sq mi)
- Elevation: 126 m (413 ft)

Population (2025-12-31)
  - Total: 9,592
  - Density: 776.7/km^{2} (2,012/sq mi)
- Time zone: UTC+01:00 (CET)
  - Summer (DST): UTC+02:00 (CEST)
- Postal codes: 69493
- Dialling codes: 06201
- Vehicle registration: HD
- Website: www.hirschberg-bergstrasse.de

Hirschberg an der Bergstraße (German pronunciation: [ˈhɪʁʃˌbɛʁk ʔan deːɐ̯ ˈbɛʁkˌʃtʁaːsə], lit. 'Hirschberg on the Mountain Road') is a municipality in the Rhein-Neckar district of Baden-Württemberg, Germany. Hirschberg is situated on the Bergstraße ("Mountain Road") on the western rim of the Odenwald. It lies between Weinheim to the north and Schriesheim to the south. Hirschberg consists of two boroughs:

- Leutershausen
- Großsachsen
