= Nußloch =

- Municipality
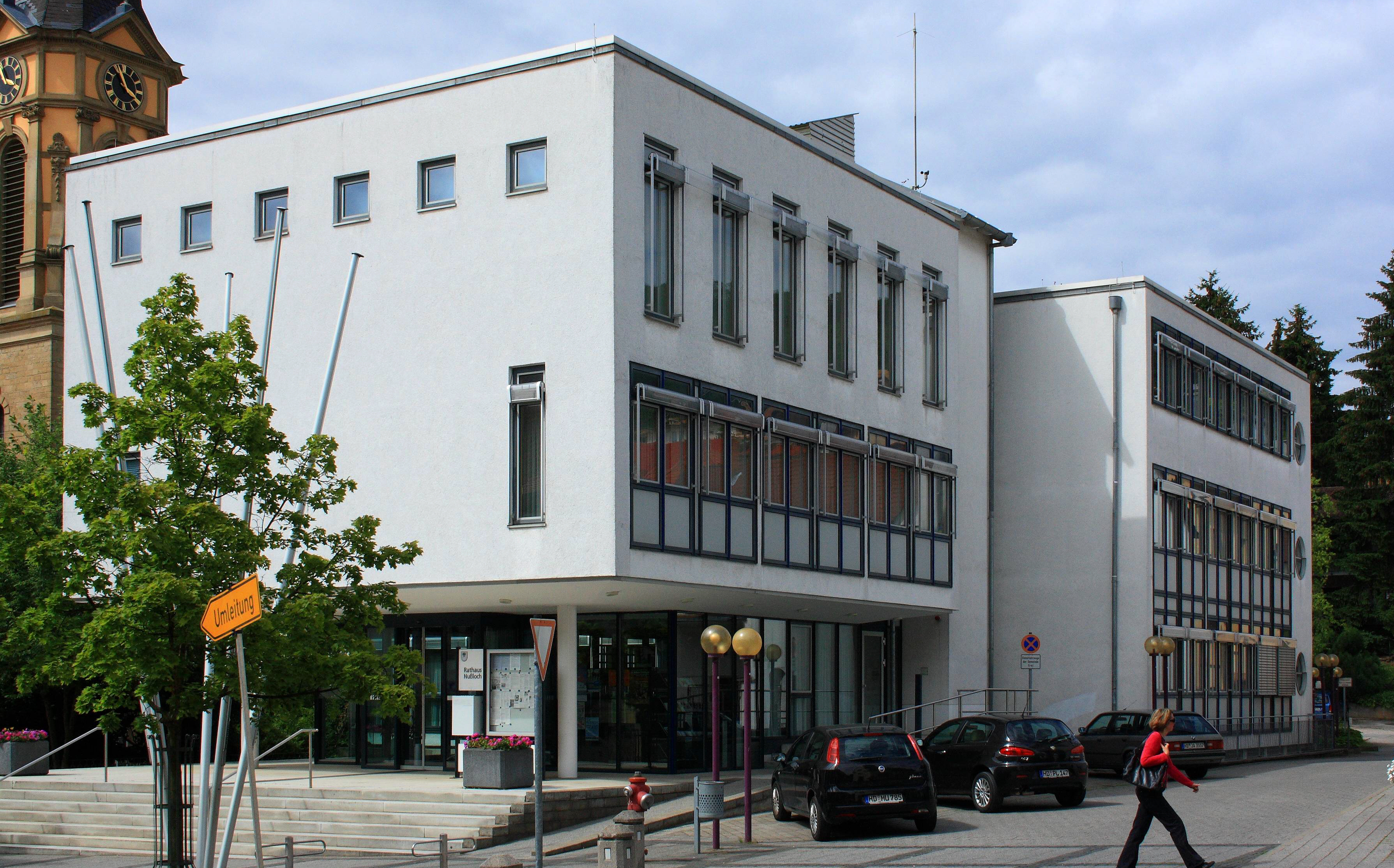
- Town hall

- Coat of arms

- Location of Nußloch within Rhein-Neckar-Kreis district
- Interactive map of Nußloch
- Location within Germany Location within Baden-Württemberg
- Coordinates: 49°19′25″N 08°41′38″E
- Country: Germany
- State: Baden-Württemberg
- Admin. region: Karlsruhe
- District: Rhein-Neckar-Kreis

Government
  - Mayor (2017–25): Joachim Förster

Area
  - Total: 13.59 km^{2} (5.25 sq mi)
- Elevation: 146 m (479 ft)

Population (2025-12-31)
  - Total: 11,392
  - Density: 838.3/km^{2} (2,171/sq mi)
- Time zone: UTC+01:00 (CET)
  - Summer (DST): UTC+02:00 (CEST)
- Postal codes: 69226
- Dialling codes: 06224
- Vehicle registration: HD
- Website: www.nussloch.de

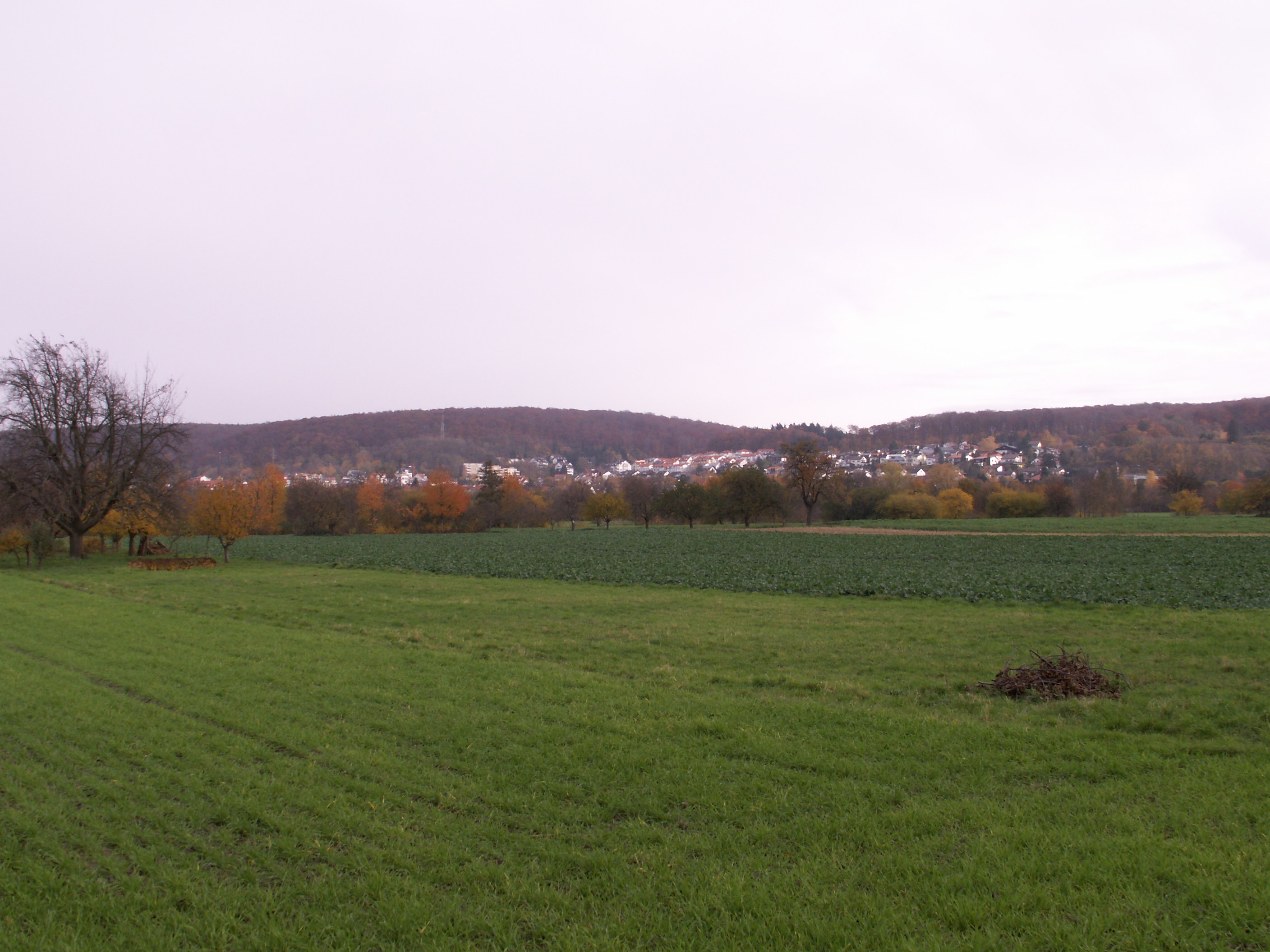
Nußloch from across the Saugrund

Nußloch is a municipality in the Rhein-Neckar-Kreis (Baden-Württemberg), about 10 km south of Heidelberg. It is on a much traveled tourist route: Bergstraße ("Mountain Road") and Bertha Benz Memorial Route. The hamlet of Maisbach also belongs to Nußloch.

== History ==
Nußloch was first mentioned on 31 December 766 in a deed of gift to the Lorsch Abbey. A married couple of strong faith donated a vineyard to the monastery from their property in Nußloch. It has been under the control of the Palatinate at the latest since 1269. The hamlet of Maisbach was annexed on 1 April 1937.

== Nature ==
=== Natural monument “Thick Beech” ===
Nestled in the Neckartal-Odenwald Nature Park, hikers come across the remains of the thick beech tree in the Nußloch community forest, near the Erlenteichweg. According to the forestry office's information board, the former natural monument on Hirschberg had a total height of 46 m and a trunk circumference of 4.20 m. The age of the beech was estimated to be around 260 years. Based on dendrological information, the tree germinated around 1740. The Thick Beech was a popular destination for hikes for a long time. Hugging the tribe became a ritual, requiring up to four people.

After a lightning strike in the spring of 1968, a main branch broke off in the crown area. As a result of moisture penetration, rot and frost damage ate into the interior of the trunk over time. Attempts at renovation by the forestry authorities failed due to the high costs. The mighty beech tree therefore became a danger and had to be felled on 9 June 1999. The trunk and stump remained on site as evidence of Nußloch's forest history.

== Demographics ==
Population development:

Year	Inhabitants
1990	9,719
2001	10,661
2011	10,482
2021	11,271

== Government ==
Nußloch has a municipal council with 18 members according to the municipal code of Baden-Württemberg. The mayor also has a seat and a vote in the municipal council as a regular member.

=== Municipal Council ===
Municipal Council 2019
Party	Votes	Seats
CDU	29.3 %	5
FDP/BfN	24.5 %	5
SPD	17.7 %	3
Greens	28.4 %	5
Voter Participation: %

=== Sister cities ===
The community of Nußloch has sister city relationships to the following communities:

- Andernos-les-Bains in France since 1977
- Nagyatád in Hungary since 2000
- Segorbe in Spain since 2001

== Economy ==
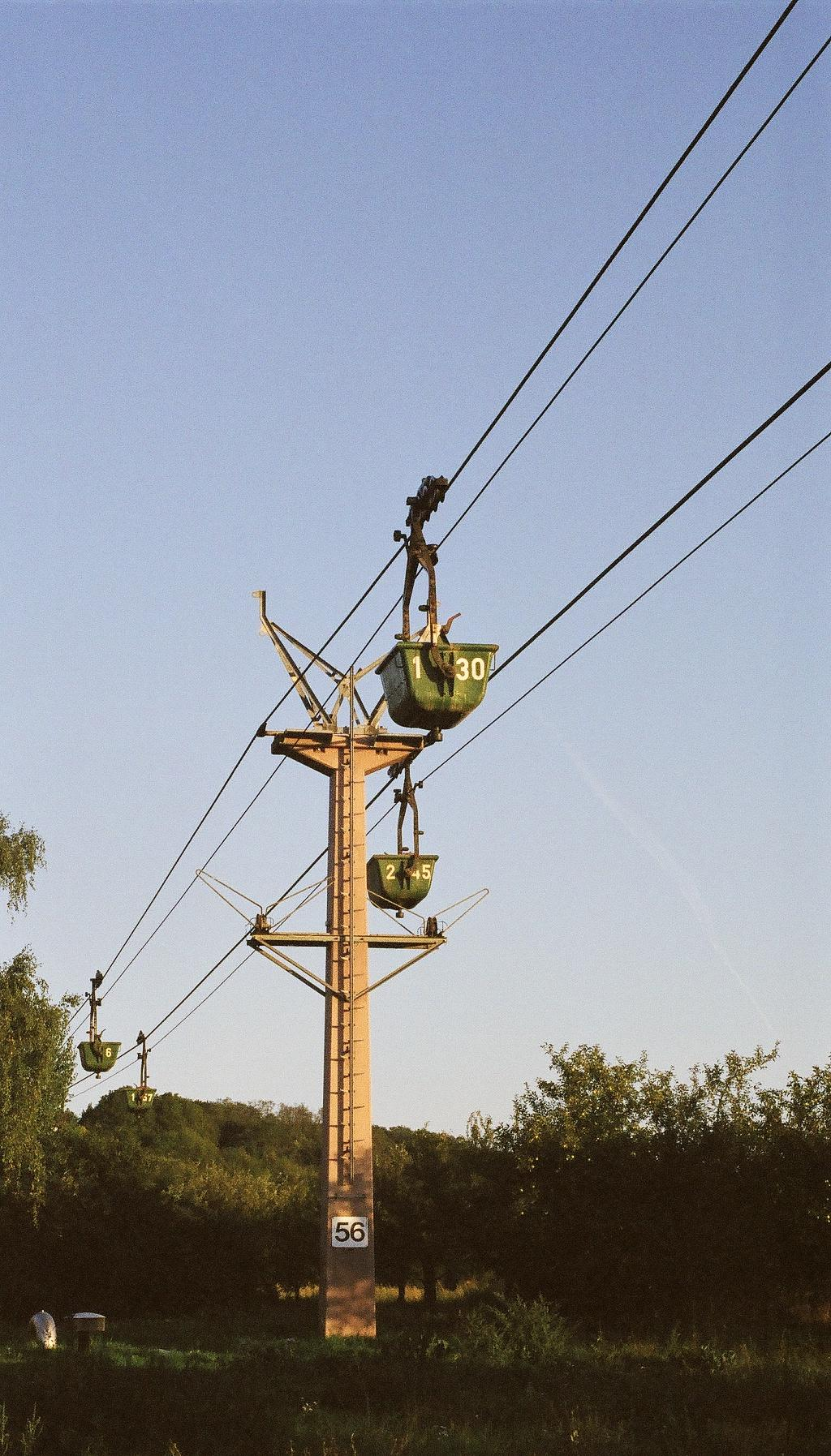
Cable car for limestone transport in Nußloch

Due to Nußloch's exposed south-west location, wine-growing had a long tradition and has always been part of small-scale farming. In the 19th century there were extensive areas under cultivation on the western slopes of the Leopoldsberg, the Wilhelmsberg and the Neuen Berg. Today, the vineyards have almost disappeared from the landscape. Remnants can still be found in the Wilhelmsberg district bordering on Wiesloch. A winery from Liemen supports local ecological cultivation.

The clothing company Betty Barclay employs more than 500 people in Nußloch. The factory outlet is supposed to be expanded to include 8000 square meters of salesfloor.

In Nußloch there is a large limestone quarry of the well-known company HeidelbergCement. The quarrying of the limestone began in 1899. After crushing, the crushed shell limestone is transported from Nußloch to Liemen with the help of a material cable car, that is about five kilometers long. The meanwhile aging facility (built in 1918) has proven to be a very environmentally friendly means of transport. During the First World War, the plant only operated irregularly, so that the cable car had to be shut down again and again. It can therefore only be assumed, that the company was really profitable from the end of 1918. Limestone quarrying is scheduled to end in 2023. The future use of the cable car and its route between the Nußloch quarry and the Leimen cement works was unclear for a long time. In February 2023, the Baden-Württemberg State Office for the Preservation of Monuments placed the material cableway between the Nußloch quarry and the Leimen cement works under protection as a landscape-defining cultural monument immediately after it was decommissioned in its entirety, including production facilities.
