= Goldbeck GmbH =

German construction company

Coordinates: 51.963982°N 8.457456°E

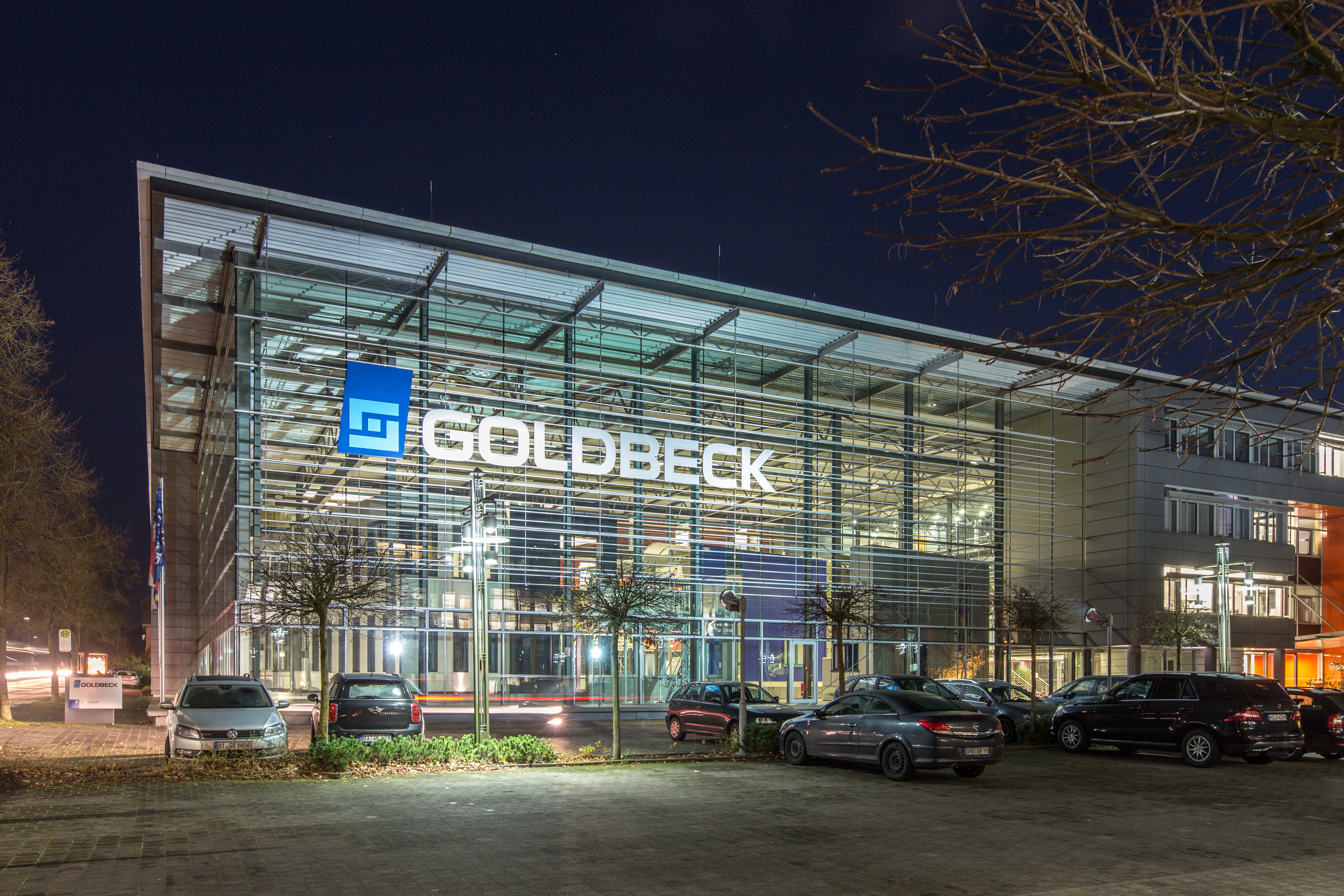
- Type: Gesellschaft mit beschränkter Haftung
- Industry: Architectural engineering, property management
- Founded: September 1, 1969; 56 years ago in Bielefeld, Germany
- Founder: Ortwin Goldbeck
- Headquarters: Bielefeld
- Key people: Jörg-Uwe Goldbeck; Jan-Hendrik Goldbeck; Oliver Schele; Hans-Jörg Frieauff
- Revenue: 5 billion euros (2022)
- Number of employees: Around 11,000 (2022)
- Website: goldbeck.de/en/

The Goldbeck GmbH is a family-run construction company based in Bielefeld, North Rhine-Westphalia. Its main area of operation lies in civil engineering for the commercial and public sectors. According to 2022 figures, the company has around 100 locations, including 13 of its own plants.

== History ==
The company was founded on 1 September 1969 by Ortwin Goldbeck in Bielefeld-Ummeln as a steel construction company. The first local branch was established in 1973 in Langenhagen near Hanover. In the mid-1980s, it also began to manufacture office buildings and multi-storey car parks in addition to industrial buildings. In the 1990s, the company continued its expansion with the opening of a new plant in the town of Treuen in Vogtland (1992), the purchase of a precast concrete part plant in the Czech Republic (1994) and the foundation of Goldbeck International GmbH (1997).

In 2001, the company founded the subsidiary Goldbeck Solar to offer photovoltaic system installation on industrial building roofs, general building roofs and in free areas. In the same year, it set up a joint venture called Goldbeck Rhomberg together with an Austrian partner to cater to the Austrian and Swiss markets. Ortwin Goldbeck handed over the management of the company to his sons Jörg-Uwe and Jan-Hendrik Goldbeck in 2007. In 2009, a new plant for precast concrete parts launched in Hamm. This was followed by the purchase and modernisation of a plant for precast concrete parts in Vöhringen near Ulm four years later. The photovoltaic business was spun off from the corporate group in 2018. The following year, Goldbeck acquired the French industrial and logistics turnkey contractor, GSE Group. The company’s interest in the Scandinavian market prompted it to buy all shares in the Danish family business DS Gruppen in 2022.

Jan-Hendrik Goldbeck is a vocal critic of German politics and regulations.

== Products and services ==
Goldbeck designs and constructs the following building types: industrial buildings, office buildings, multi-storey car parks, residential and school buildings. The company also offers existing building refurbishment. Its range of building-related services include property management and facility management, as well as the management of parking areas and multi-storey car parks. Cooperation with public-sector clients on property construction and operation is handled by a dedicated specialist unit (Goldbeck Public Partner).

== Foundation ==
The Goldbeck Foundation was founded in 2009. It primarily promotes projects in the fields of science and research, art and culture, as well as education and social issues.

== Sources ==
- Georg Meck: Vertrauen ist besser. Ortwin Goldbeck – eine Unternehmerbiografie. Herder. Freiburg, Basel, Wien 2021, ISBN 978-3-451-38923-8.
- Elena Brenk, Mechthild Hempe: Goldbeck. Seit 1969. teNeues. Kempen 2019, ISBN 978-3-96171-157-4.
- Anne Kitsch: „Ein inneres Bild unserer zukünftigen Realität“. Ortwin Goldbeck – Reflexionen über eine Unternehmenskultur. Goldbeck, Bielefeld 2007, ISBN 978-3-923830-61-9.
