= Hessische Bergstraße =

Wine-producing region

Coordinates: 49°43′01″N 8°37′01″E

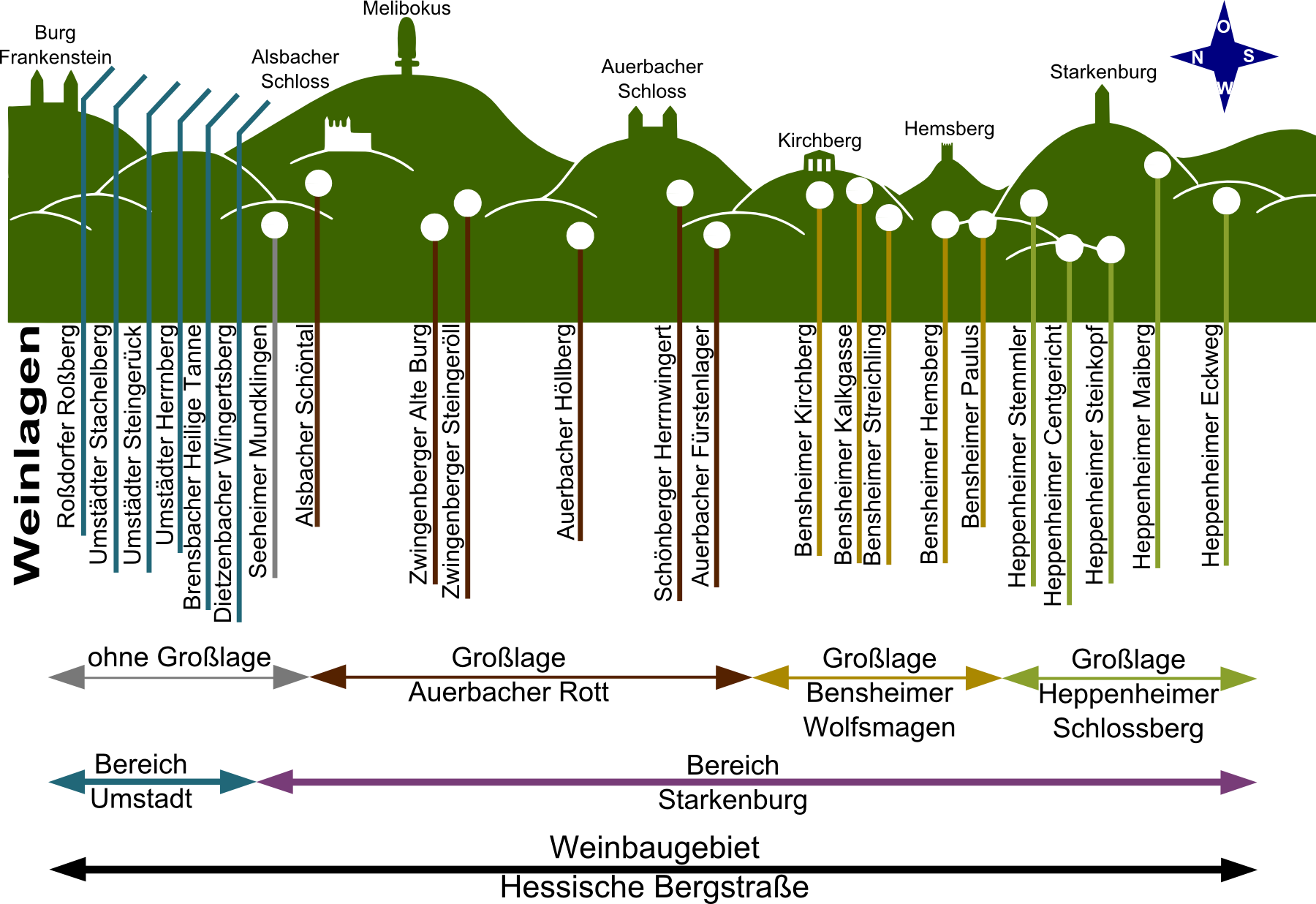
Topographic profile of the Hessische Bergstraße showing all the region's districts, collective vineyard sites and vineyard sites.

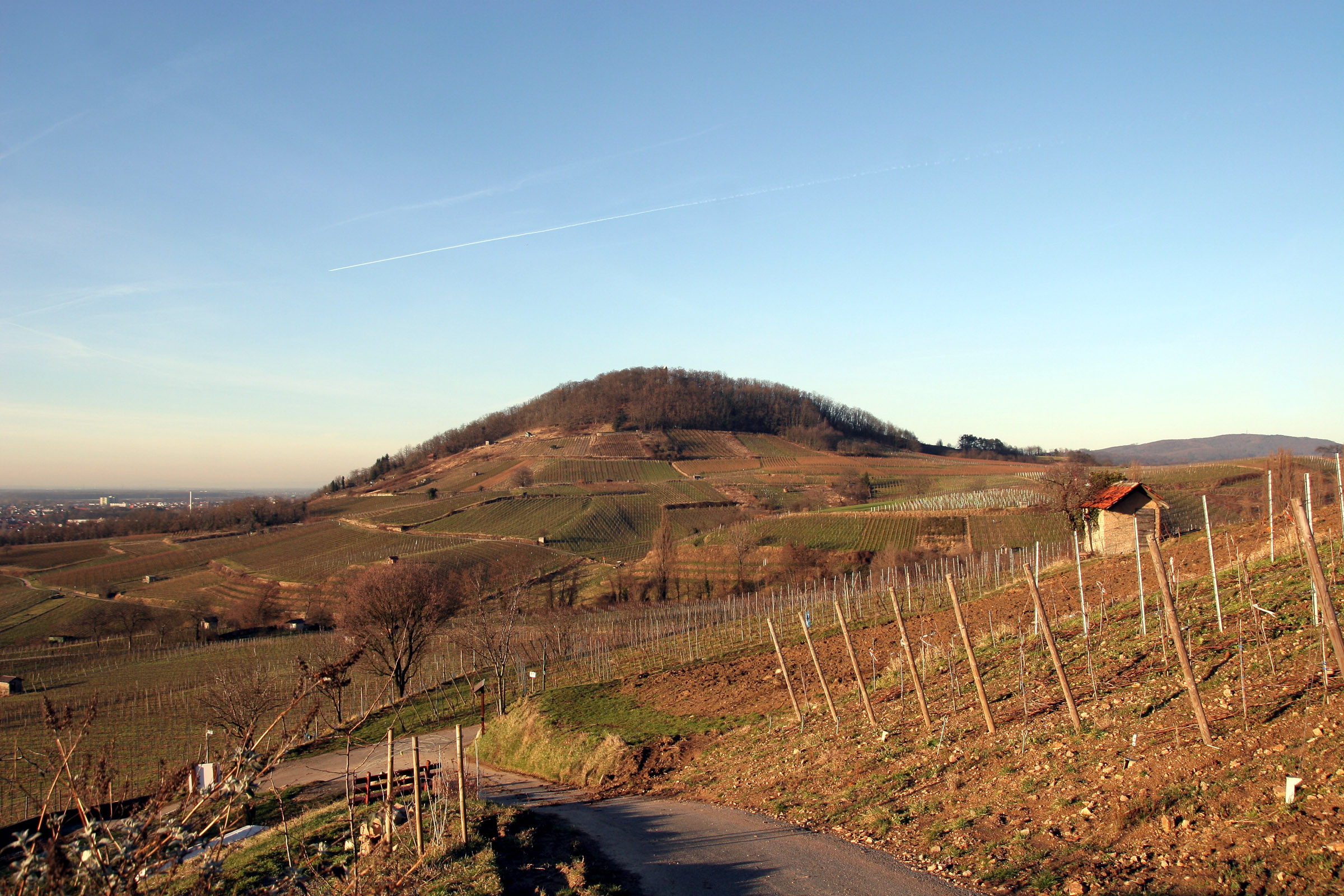
Vineyards around Bensheim.

The Hessische Bergstraße (German pronunciation: [ˈhɛsɪʃə ˈbɛʁk.ʃtʁaːsə]; lit. 'Hessian Mountain Road') is a defined region (Anbaugebiet) for wine in Germany located in the state of Hesse among the northern and western slopes of the Odenwald mountain chain. With only 467 hectares (1,150 acres) of vineyards it is the smallest of the 13 German quality wine regions. At 21% red grape varieties and 79% white varieties, it is planted with primarily Riesling (40% as of 2019), Pinot gris (12%) and Spätburgunder (Pinot Noir, 11%). Hessische Bergstraße is divided into two districts (Bereiche) – Umstadt and Starkenburg – three collective vineyard sites and 24 individual vineyard sites.

The region produces mostly dry wines (14,000 hl in 2019), some off-dry (5,000 hl in 2019) but does have a sizable production of Eiswein. The wines from the best producers are in a style similar to that of Rheingau.

The majority of the region's wine is produced by a winemaking cooperative based in the city of Heppenheim, to which about 620 of 850 growers of the region deliver their grapes. The state government of Hesse, through the Hessian State Wineries (Hessische Staatsweingüter) is the biggest single vineyard owner with 38 hectares (94 acres) since 2008 processed in the central cellar of the state wineries at the Steinberg, Kloster Eberbach, site.

Because of the small production and a location rather close to densely populated areas, most of the wines is sold locally, and it is very uncommon to see Bergstraße wines outside of Germany.

== History ==
When the Counts of Katzenelnbogen first cultivated Riesling in 1435 the first time they already documented wine from the Bergstraße. This northern Bergstraße was their property: When they died out in 1479 this part of the county came to the Landgraves of Hesse. The Hessische Bergstrasse has existed as an independent winegrowing region only since 1971. Before that, it formed the Bergstrasse winegrowing region together with the Badische Bergstrasse. At that time, a new wine law made restructuring measures in Baden necessary. Baden claimed the part of the Bergstrasse that lies within its state borders. This concerns the area south of Heppenheim. The northern part of the Bergstrasse, the Hessian Bergstrasse, was originally to be added to the Rheingau. However, since this did not seem to make sense either geographically or administratively, the smallest wine-growing region in Germany at that time was created.

The Romans probably began winegrowing on the Strata Montana (Bergstrasse) about 2,000 years ago. Documentarily, viticulture is mentioned for the first time in the 8th century in the Lorsch Codex (Codex Laureshamensis).

== Grape varieties ==
The most cultivated grape varieties by area in 2018 are detailed in the following document:

- Riesling, 211 ha (48.1%)
- Spätburgunder, 45 ha (10.3%)
- Grauer Burgunder, 38 ha (8.7%)
- Müller-Thurgau, 32 ha (7.3%)
- Silvaner, 18 ha (4.1%)
- Dornfelder, 15 ha (3.4%)
- Weißer Burgunder, 15 ha (3.4%)
- Kerner, 13 ha (3.0%)
