= Laudenbach (Rhein-Neckar) =

- Municipality
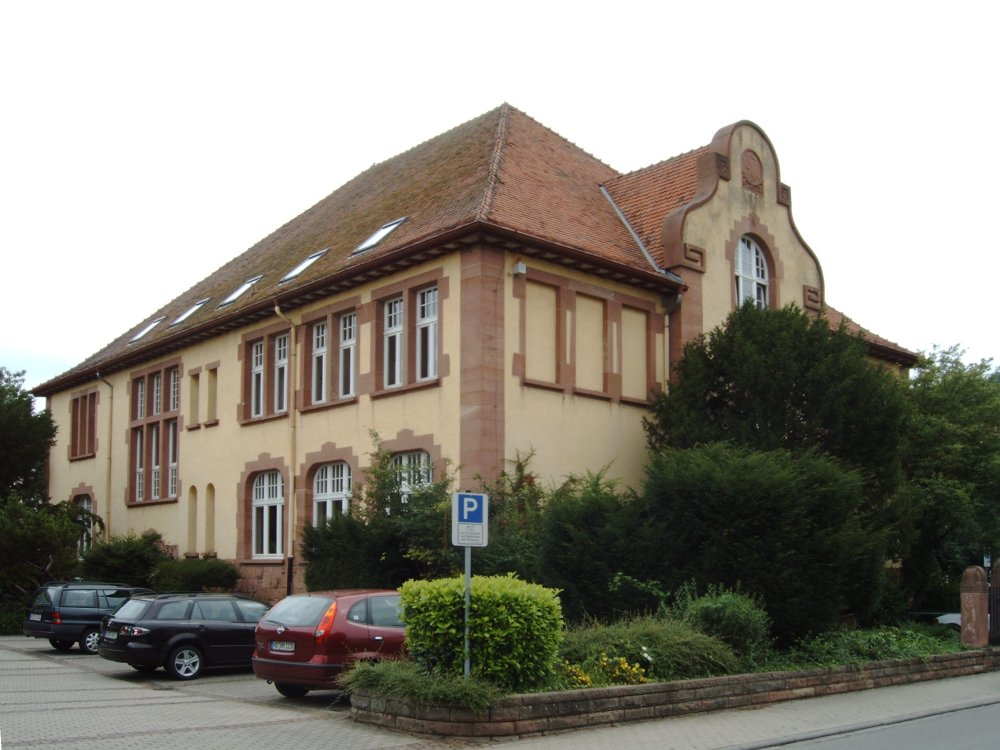
- Town hall

- Coat of arms

- Location of Laudenbach within Rhein-Neckar-Kreis district
- Interactive map of Laudenbach
- Location within Germany Location within Baden-Württemberg
- Coordinates: 49°36′41″N 08°39′00″E
- Country: Germany
- State: Baden-Württemberg
- Admin. region: Karlsruhe
- District: Rhein-Neckar-Kreis

Government
  - Mayor (2019–27): Benjamin Köpfle (SPD)

Area
  - Total: 10.29 km^{2} (3.97 sq mi)
- Elevation: 120 m (390 ft)

Population (2025-12-31)
  - Total: 6,627
  - Density: 644.0/km^{2} (1,668/sq mi)
- Time zone: UTC+01:00 (CET)
  - Summer (DST): UTC+02:00 (CEST)
- Postal codes: 69514
- Dialling codes: 06201
- Vehicle registration: HD
- Website: www.gemeinde-laudenbach.de

Laudenbach (German pronunciation: [ˈlaʊdn̩bax]) is a municipality in the district of Rhein-Neckar in Baden-Württemberg in Germany.

== Demographics ==
Population development:

Year	Inhabitants
1990	5,325
2001	5,937
2011	6,028
2021	6,430
