= Biebesheim am Rhein =

- Municipality
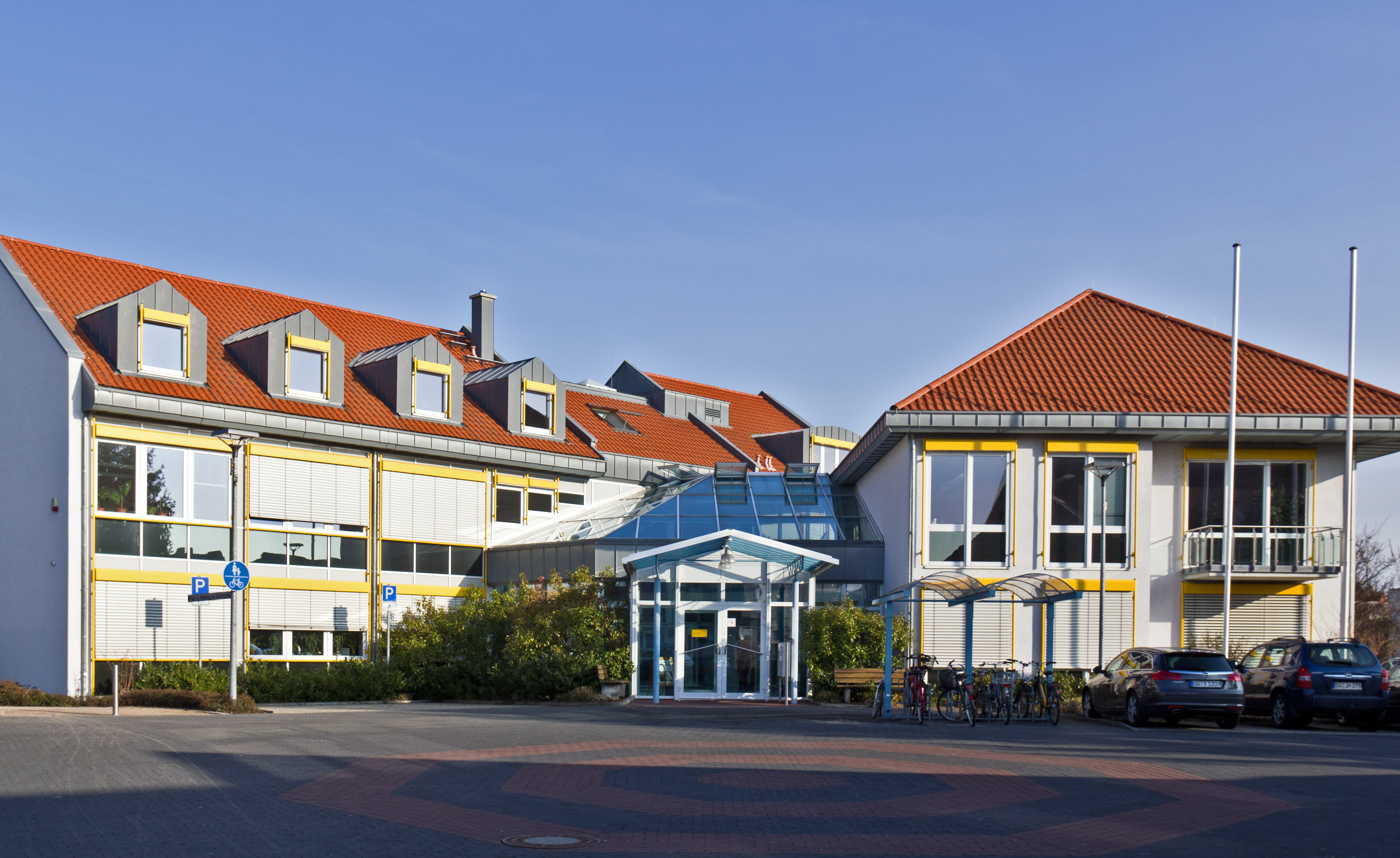
- Town hall

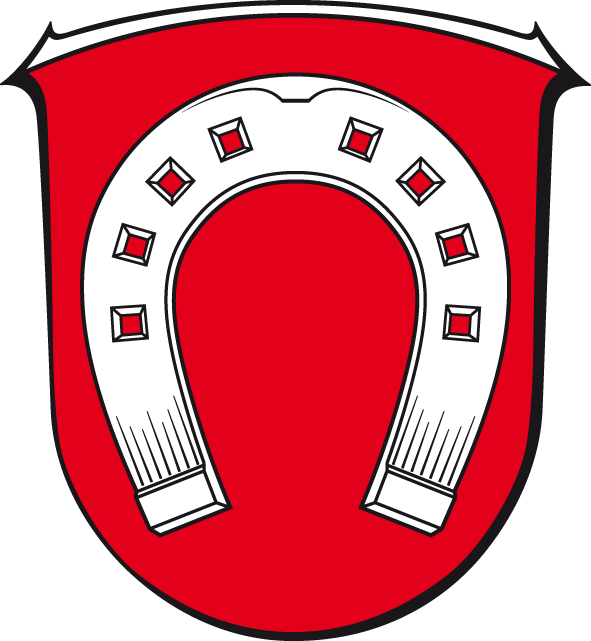
- Coat of arms

- Location of Biebesheim am Rhein within Groß-Gerau district
- Interactive map of Biebesheim am Rhein
- Location within Germany Location within Hesse
- Coordinates: 49°47′N 08°28′E
- Country: Germany
- State: Hesse
- Admin. region: Darmstadt
- District: Groß-Gerau

Government
  - Mayor (2023–29): Marcus Rahner (CDU)

Area
  - Total: 18.68 km^{2} (7.21 sq mi)
- Elevation: 88 m (289 ft)

Population (2025-12-31)
  - Total: 6,436
  - Density: 344.5/km^{2} (892.4/sq mi)
- Time zone: UTC+01:00 (CET)
  - Summer (DST): UTC+02:00 (CEST)
- Postal codes: 64584
- Dialling codes: 06258
- Vehicle registration: GG
- Website: www.biebesheim.de

Biebesheim am Rhein is a municipality in Groß-Gerau district in Hesse, Germany.

== Geography ==
=== Location ===
Biebesheim am Rhein lies in the Hessisches Ried, the northeastern section of the Rhine rift, west of Darmstadt and north of Worms. Frankfurt am Main is about 50 km away.

=== Neighbouring communities ===
Biebesheim borders in the north on the community of Stockstadt, in the east on the town of Riedstadt, in the south on the town of Gernsheim, and in the west on the communities of Hamm, Eich and Gimbsheim (all in Alzey-Worms).

=== Constituent communities ===
Biebesheim has only one constituent community.

== Politics ==
=== Municipal council ===
Biebesheim's council is made up of 31 councillors, with seats apportioned thus, in accordance with municipal elections held on 26 March 2006:

SPD	12 seats
CDU	11 seats
Greens	4 seats
FWB	4 seats

Note: FWB is a citizens' coalition.

=== Coat of arms ===
Biebesheim's civic coat of arms might heraldically be described thus: In gules a horseshoe, ends downturned, argent.

The heraldic charge – the horseshoe – is known from a village seal dating from 1546, but could be older than that. The actual arms bearing the horseshoe from the old seal were granted in 1926.

=== Partnerships ===
Biebesheim maintains partnership links with:

- Romilly-sur-Andelle, département of Eure, Normandy, France since 1971
- Palo-del-Colle near Bari, Italy since 1986

== Sightseeing ==
Bordering on Biebesheim's north is the Kühkopf-Knoblochsaue nature reserve, a piece of floodplain and wetland surrounded by the Rhine and the Old Rhine.

== Economy and infrastructure ==
=== Established enterprises ===
- Biebesheim is a HIM GmbH location, the central incineration facility for toxins and industrial waste in Hesse.
