= Gernsheim =

- Town
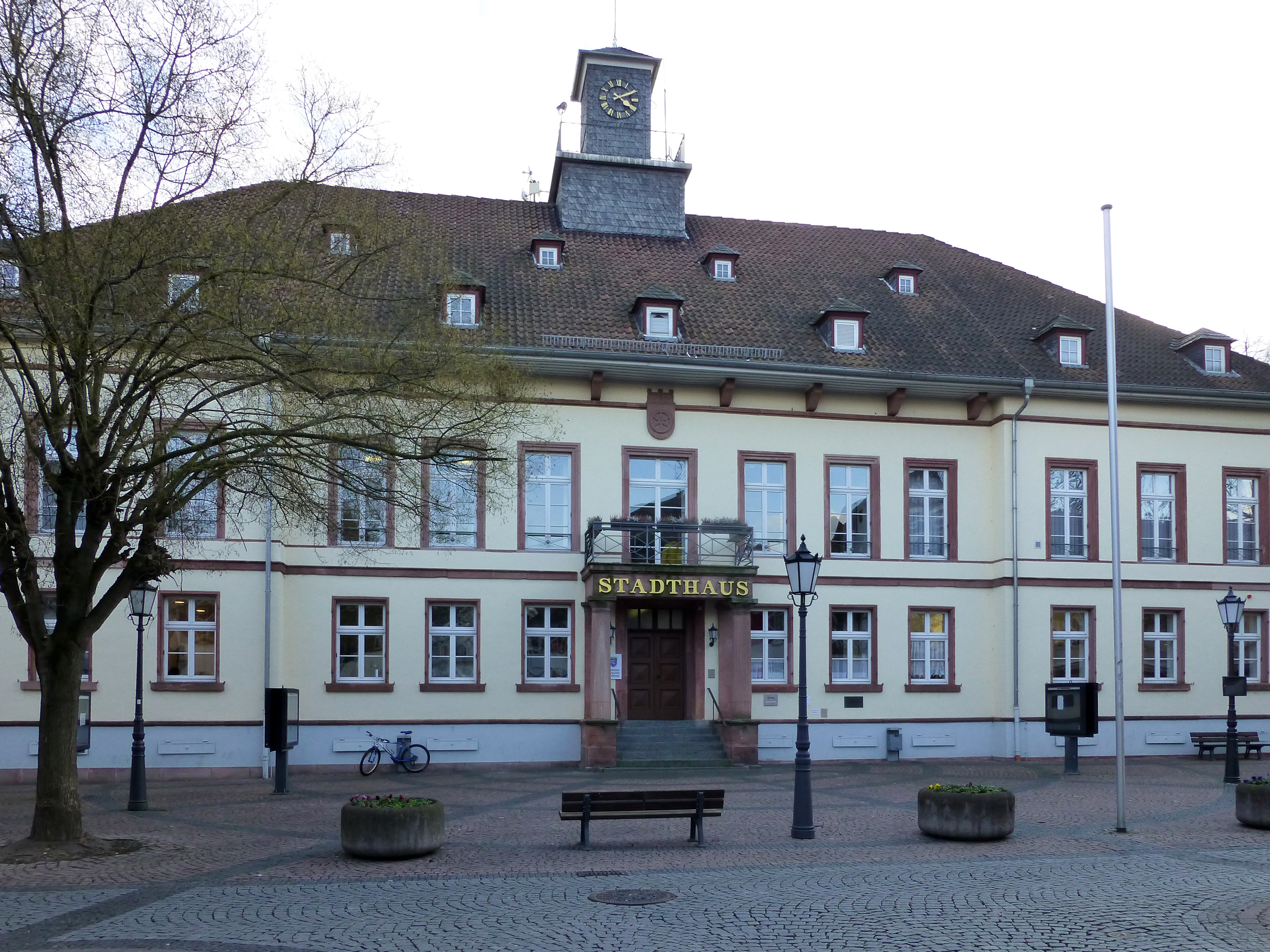
- Town hall

- Flag Coat of arms

- Location of Gernsheim within Groß-Gerau district
- Interactive map of Gernsheim
- Location within Germany Location within Hesse
- Coordinates: 49°45′N 08°29′E
- Country: Germany
- State: Hesse
- Admin. region: Darmstadt
- District: Groß-Gerau

Government
  - Mayor (2022–28): Peter Burger (CDU)

Area
  - Total: 40.11 km^{2} (15.49 sq mi)
- Elevation: 88 m (289 ft)

Population (2025-12-31)
  - Total: 10,777
  - Density: 268.7/km^{2} (695.9/sq mi)
- Time zone: UTC+01:00 (CET)
  - Summer (DST): UTC+02:00 (CEST)
- Postal codes: 64579
- Dialling codes: 06258
- Vehicle registration: GG
- Website: www.gernsheim.de

Gernsheim (German pronunciation: [ˈɡɛʁnsˌhaɪm]) is a town in Groß-Gerau district and Darmstadt region in Hesse, Germany, lying on the Rhine.

== Geography ==
=== Location ===
The Schöfferstadt Gernsheim, as Gernsheim may officially call itself – it was Peter Schöffer's birthplace – lies 18 km southwest of Darmstadt and 16 km northeast of Worms, right on the Rhine's east bank, south of the Old Rhine near Stockstadt am Rhein in the Frankfurt Rhein-Main Region.

=== Neighbouring communities ===
Gernsheim borders in the north on the communities of Biebesheim and Riedstadt, in the east on the town of Pfungstadt and the communities of Bickenbach and Alsbach-Hähnlein (all in Darmstadt-Dieburg), in the south on the town of Bensheim and the communities of Einhausen and Groß-Rohrheim (all in Kreis Bergstraße) and in the west on the community of Hamm (Alzey-Worms).

=== Constituent communities ===
Gernsheim consists of the centres of Allmendfeld, Gernsheim and Klein-Rohrheim.

== History ==
In the first century, there was Roman settlement in what is now Gernsheim. By the 7th century, this had given way to Frankish settlement. In 852, Gernsheim had its first documentary mention, and was also later mentioned in the Lorsch codex.

In 1356, Gernsheim was granted town rights by Charles IV, Holy Roman Emperor. In 1425, Peter Schöffer, later to be well known as one of Johannes Gutenberg's colleagues, was born.

In 1937, the village of Allmendfeld, now part of Gernsheim but originally a separate municipality, was founded. It is Hesse's newest town (in the common sense, if not the administrative). It is named after the commons (die Allmende in German).

=== Amalgamated communities ===
- Allmendfeld, since 1971 (founded 1937)
- Klein-Rohrheim, since 1971 (about 1200 years old)

== Politics ==
=== Coat of arms ===
Gernsheim's civic coat of arms might heraldically be described thus: Gules, a six-spoked wheel argent.

Gernsheim was among Mainz's many landholdings for centuries (1232–1802). The charge in these arms is the Wheel of Mainz, a common heraldic charge in the region, given the history, but unlike many others, Gernsheim's arms have only this one charge. The town's oldest known seal, from the 14th century, already showed the wheel, as have all seals that later followed. The arms were officially granted in 1925.

Gernsheim has the same arms as Höchst, a constituent community of Frankfurt am Main.

=== Partnerships ===
- Bar-sur-Aube, Champagne-Ardenne, France since 1976
- Świecie, Poland since 2011

== Culture and sightseeing ==
=== Buildings ===
- Wallfahrtskirche Maria Einsiedel (pilgrimage church, 1431)
- Museum (Peter Schöffer Haus)
- Rathaus (Town Hall)
- Stadthalle (guildhall)
- Old electricity works (Mario Derra)

=== Nature ===
- Rhine
- Town Forest

=== Regular events ===
- Rhenish Fishing Festival (Rheinisches Fischerfest) – since 1948, the biggest fishing festival on the Rhine (first weekend in August)
- Street Carnival (Straßenfastnacht, with parade)
- Christmas Market (Weihnachtsmarkt)
- Church Fair (Kerb)
- Downtown Festival (Innenstadtfest)

== Economy and infrastructure ==
=== Transport ===
Roads serving Gernsheim include Federal Highways (Bundesstraßen) B 44, B44a and B 426. Gernsheim is also connected to the Autobahn A 67, as well as to State Highway (Landesstraße) L 3112 and the K 206.

Gernsheim lies on the Mannheim–Frankfurt railway. There are also bus connections to Darmstadt, Bensheim, Goddelau and Lampertheim.

Gernsheim's riverfront on the Rhine is home to a container port with a railway connection. There are also ferries across the Rhine to Eich in Rhineland-Palatinate.

== Known Gernsheimer Personalities ==
- Peter Schöffer (c. 1425 – c. 1503), printer, publisher and bookseller, born in Gernsheim
- Joseph Schmitt (c. 1734-1791), composer and music publisher, born in Gernsheim
- Jürgen Walter (* 1968), politician, living in Gernsheim
- Verena Weis (* 1979), singer Indira, temporarily residing in Gernsheim
