= Riedstadt =

- Town
- Coat of arms

- Location of Riedstadt within Groß-Gerau district
- Interactive map of Riedstadt
- Location within Germany Location within Hesse
- Coordinates: 49°50′14″N 08°30′16″E
- Country: Germany
- State: Hesse
- Admin. region: Darmstadt
- District: Groß-Gerau

Government
  - Mayor (2022–28): Marcus Kretschmann (CDU)

Area
  - Total: 73.73 km^{2} (28.47 sq mi)
- Elevation: 88 m (289 ft)

Population (2025-12-31)
  - Total: 23,274
  - Density: 315.7/km^{2} (817.6/sq mi)
- Time zone: UTC+01:00 (CET)
  - Summer (DST): UTC+02:00 (CEST)
- Postal codes: 64560
- Dialling codes: 06158
- Vehicle registration: GG
- Website: www.riedstadt.de

Riedstadt (German pronunciation: [ˈʁiːtˌʃtat]), with its municipal area of 73.76 km^{2} is Groß-Gerau district's biggest town by land area. It lies in Hesse, Germany, about 12 km southwest of Darmstadt.

== Geography ==
=== Location ===
Riedstadt is shaped not only by its preserved rural structure, but also by being near several cities, namely Frankfurt am Main, Darmstadt, Wiesbaden, Mainz, and Mannheim. As its name suggests, it lies in the Hessisches Ried, the northeastern section of the Rhine rift. The community practises the structured settlement of environmentally friendly business operations.

Local recreation sites near the community include the Kühkopf-Knoblochsaue nature reserve, the Bergstraße, the Odenwald, and the Taunus.

=== Neighbouring communities ===
Riedstadt borders in the north on the community of Trebur and the town of Groß-Gerau, in the east on the towns of Griesheim and Pfungstadt (both in Darmstadt-Dieburg), in the south on the town of Gernsheim and the communities of Biebesheim and Stockstadt am Rhein, and in the west on the communities of Ludwigshöhe and Dienheim as well as the town of Oppenheim (all 3 in Mainz-Bingen).

=== Constituent communities ===
Riedstadt consists of the centres Crumstadt, Erfelden, Goddelau, Leeheim, and Wolfskehlen.

== History ==
=== Amalgamations ===
The community came into being on 1 January 1977 with Hesse's municipal reforms, which merged the formerly independent communities of Goddelau, Wolfskehlen (which had already merged voluntarily with Goddelau in 1973), Erfelden, Crumstadt, and Leeheim.

=== Erfelden ===
Erfelden was first mentioned in a donation document from the Lorsch Monastery in 779. In the Thirty Years' War, King Gustavus Adolphus of Sweden spent two nights at the mayor's house in 1631 while his troops were crossing the Rhine. His building master Matthäus Staud built the Schwedensäule ("Swedes' column") at Erfelden which recalls the crossing.

=== Goddelau ===
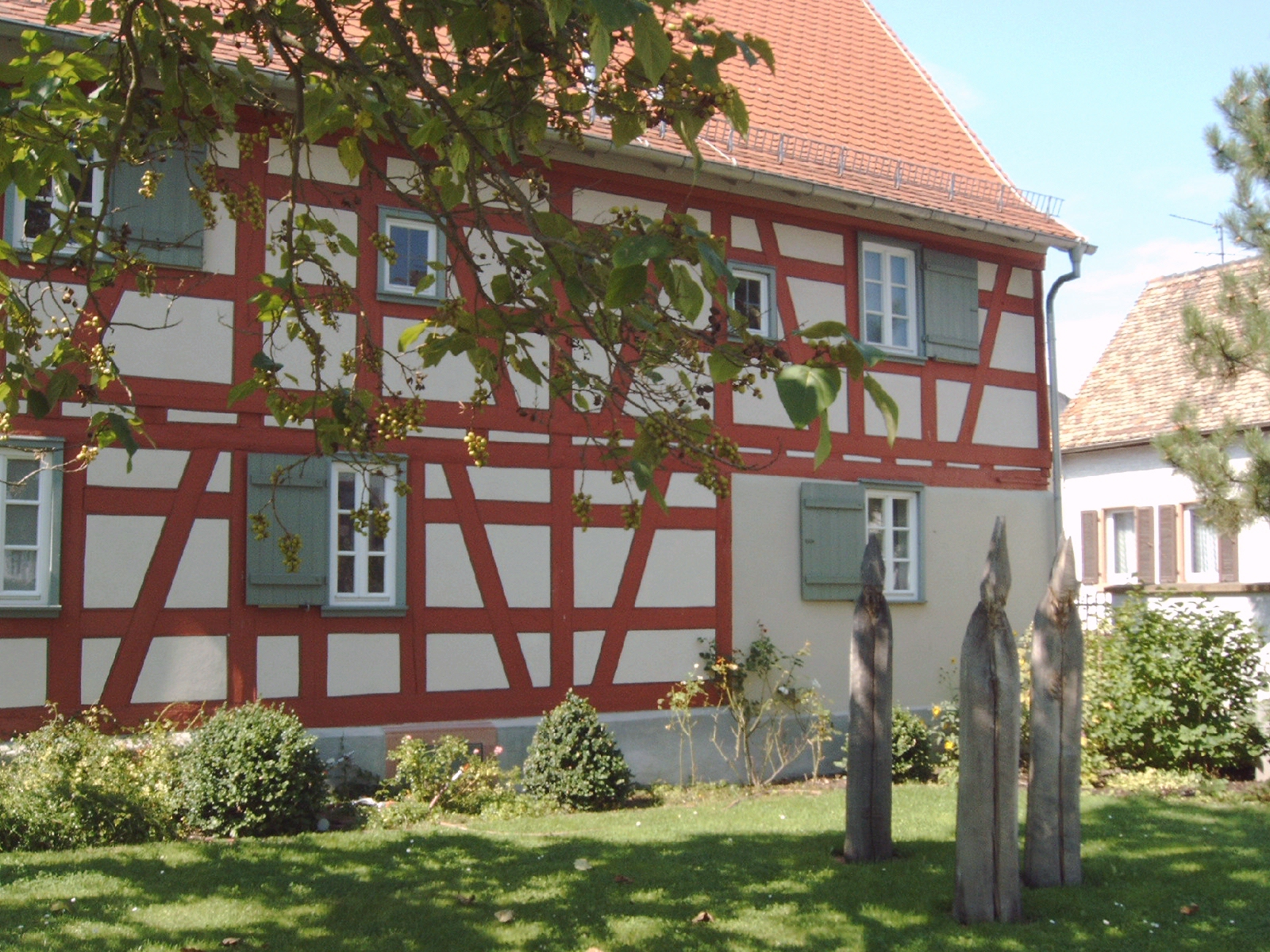
Georg Büchner's birth house

Goddelau was first mentioned in a donation document when Count Gundram donated his property "in Terminis Gotalohono" to Fulda Abbey. Over the centuries, the village was shaped by its dwellers' agricultural and handicraft activities. In 1588 there were roughly 180 inhabitants in Goddelau. The house in which writer and revolutionary Georg Büchner would later be born was built in 1665, and still stands today.

=== Leeheim ===
Leeheim was first mentioned in the Lorsch codex in 766 when a man named Dodo made a donation to the Lorsch Monastery. Near the earlier village of Camba, the Salian Conrad II was chosen to be German King in 1024. Leeheim was shaped by several monastic properties, belonging to, among others, St. Alban's Monastery in Mainz. The overlords were the Wolfskehlers, and later the Katzenelnbogen family. In 1536, Leeheim became Evangelical, and in the Thirty Years' War, more than 70% of the village was destroyed. In 1666, almost half the inhabitants lost their lives to the Plague.

In earlier times, Leeheim developed itself from a farming village into a workers' residential village with recreational lands on the Riedsee, a nearby lake, and a golf course.

=== Wolfskehlen ===
Wolfskehlen is Riedstadt's northernmost constituent community. It was first mentioned in the document Historia Episcopatus Wormatiensis in 1002 in which Emperor Heinrich II granted Bishop Burchard of Worms the rights in the Forest of Forehahi. In 1252, the Lords of Wolfskehlen, who had taken their name from the village, sold Neuwolfskehlen Castle to the Archbishop of Mainz. In 1539, Barbara von Wolfskehlen wed Eberhard von Gemmingen-Hornberg, who introduced the Reformation into Wolfskehlen. In 1579, the Mainz Palatinate (Kurmainz) ceded its rights to the Landgraves of Hesse. During the Thirty Years' War, and through the Plague, almost the whole population was killed; the reconstruction began in the 18th century. From 1868 to 1878, the building of the Mannheim–Frankfurt railway brought the dissolution of the village's purely agricultural structure. After the Second World War, the village absorbed about 800 refugees.

== Population development ==
Each time at 31 December

- 1998 – 20,050
- 1999 – 20,393
- 2000 – 20,576
- 2001 – 20,805
- 2002 – 20,984
- 2003 – 21,167
- 2004 – 21,362
- 2005 – 21,707
- 2006 – 21.728
- 2011 – 21.597
- 2014 – 22.530
- 2015 – 23.289

== Mayors ==
The mayor was since 1993 Gerald Kummer, SPD. He was reelected in 2005. In January 2011, Werner Amend (independent) was voted as the new mayor. In November 2016 Marcus Kretschmann (CDU) was elected, who will come into office in April 2017.

== Politics ==
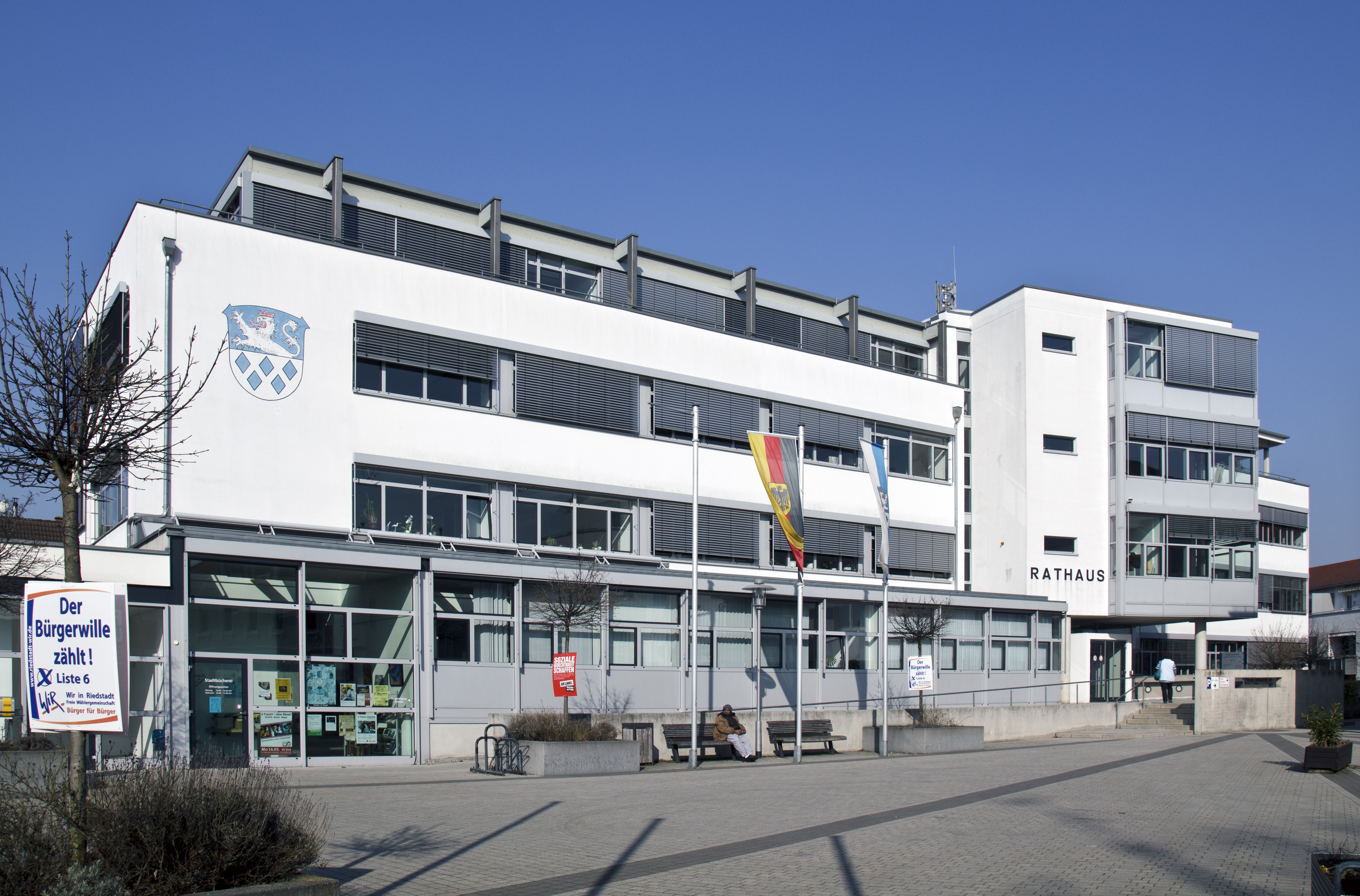
Town hall

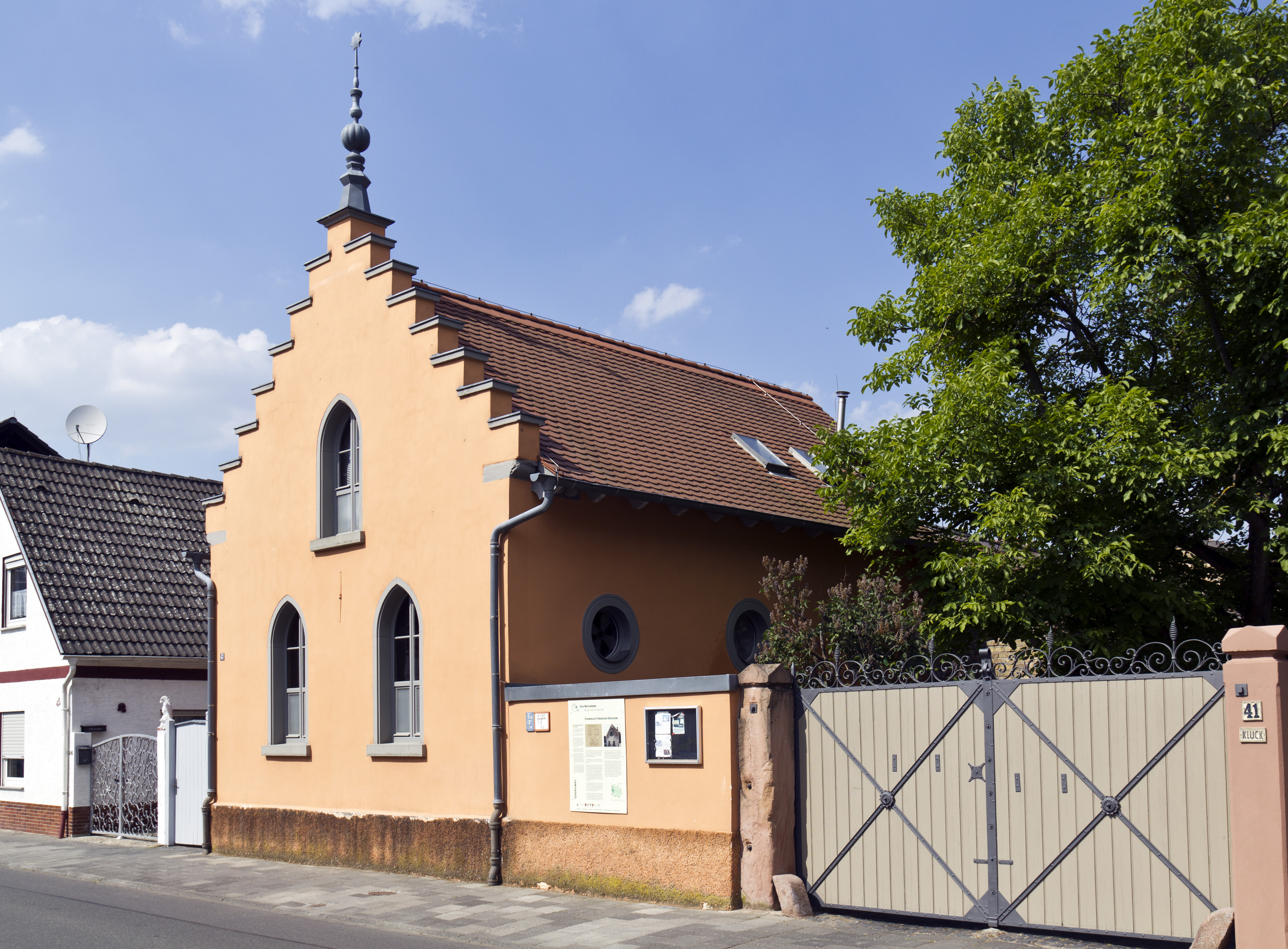
Riedstadt-Erfelden former Jewish synagogue

=== Municipal council ===
Municipal council consists of 37 seats. At the last election on 6 March 2016, the seats were apportioned thus:

- CDU 11 seats
- SPD 14 seats
- Linke 2 seats
- GLR 4 seats
- FW 6 seats

== Town partnerships ==
Riedstadt maintains partnership links with the following places:

- Brienne-le-Château, France, since 1979
- Sortino, Italy
- Tauragė, Lithuania

== Notable people ==
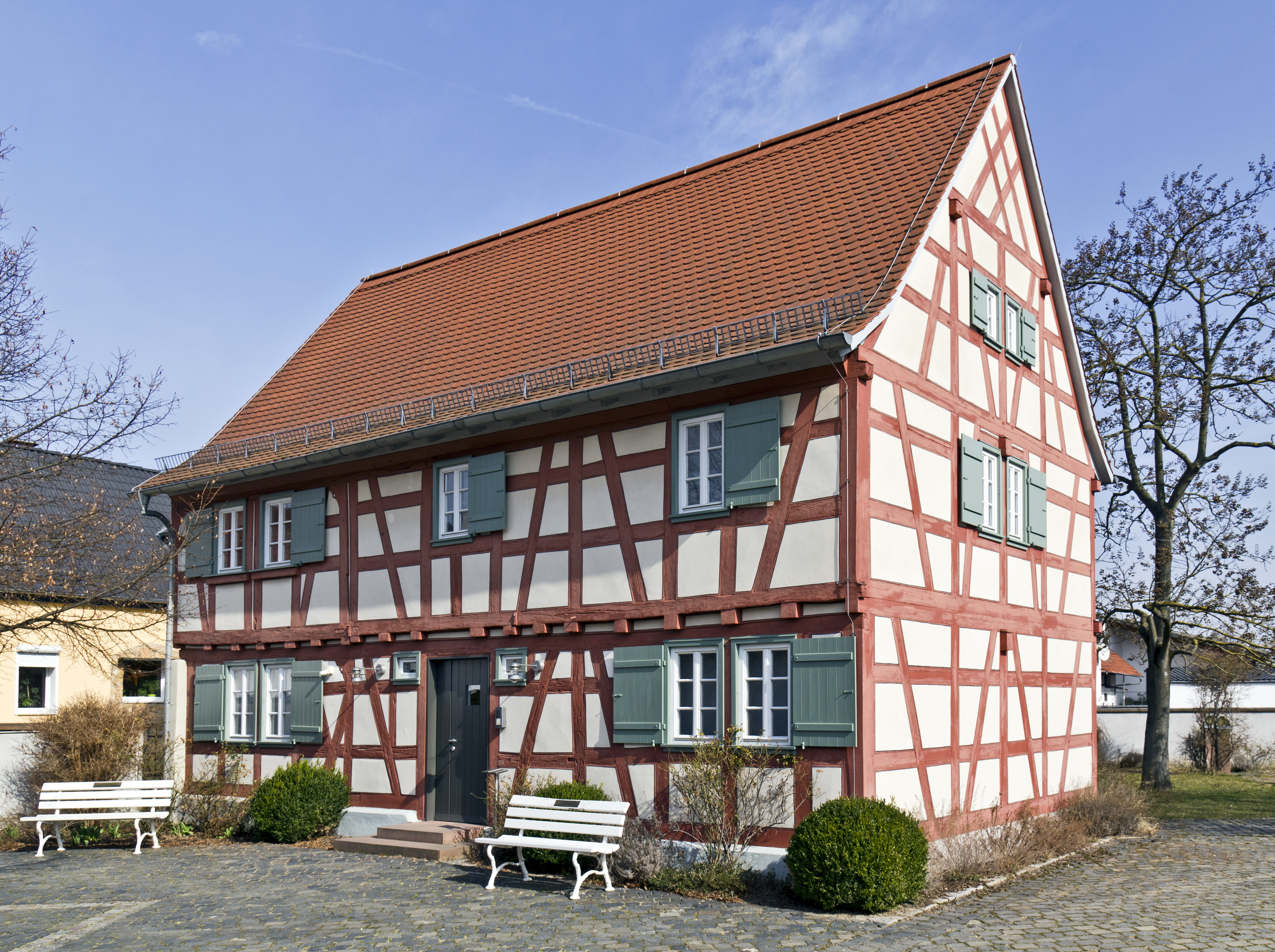
Riedstadt-Goddelau, birthplace of Georg Büchner

- Georg Büchner (1813–1837), writer and revolutionary
- Guenther Roth (1931–2019), sociologist, journalist, book author, leading American scholar on Max Weber
- Ruth Wagner (1940–2025), politician
- Peter Reuter (born 1955), PhD in clinical biochemistry, MD, author of multiple medical dictionaries

== Sundry ==
In August 1984, the remains of an ice age mammal were unearthed at a gravel pit near Crumstadt. At first thought to be a mammoth, it later turned out on further analysis, specifically of the teeth, to be a young forest elephant. The bones are now in the Hessisches Landesmuseum Darmstadt.
