= Hamm am Rhein =

- Municipality
- Coat of arms

- Location of Hamm am Rhein within Alzey-Worms district
- Interactive map of Hamm am Rhein
- Location within Germany Location within Rhineland-Palatinate
- Coordinates: 49°43′45″N 08°25′50″E
- Country: Germany
- State: Rhineland-Palatinate
- District: Alzey-Worms
- Municipal assoc.: Eich

Government
  - Mayor (2025–29): Jaqueline Rehn

Area
  - Total: 7.89 km^{2} (3.05 sq mi)
- Elevation: 87 m (285 ft)

Population (2025-12-31)
  - Total: 1,864
  - Density: 236/km^{2} (612/sq mi)
- Time zone: UTC+01:00 (CET)
  - Summer (DST): UTC+02:00 (CEST)
- Postal codes: 67580
- Dialling codes: 06246
- Vehicle registration: AZ
- Website: www.vg-eich.de

Hamm am Rhein (German pronunciation: [ˈham ʔam ˈʁaɪn], lit. 'Hamm on the Rhine') is an Ortsgemeinde – a municipality belonging to a Verbandsgemeinde, a kind of collective municipality – in the Alzey-Worms district in Rhineland-Palatinate, Germany.

== Geography ==
=== Location ===
The municipality lies in Rhenish Hesse and belongs to the Verbandsgemeinde of Eich, whose seat is in the like-named municipality.

The municipality's special charm finds its roots in its location right on the Rhine, or rather on a sidestream called the Schadegrawe, which is cut off from the Rhine's mainstream by an island, the Wörth (this word is a local variant of the German word Werder, which often means, as in this case, an island in a river; its English equivalent might be “ait” or “holm”). The name “Schadegrawe” is a dialectal pronunciation of the Standard High German “Scheidegraben” (“Parting Dyke”) between Hamm's and Ibersheim's municipal areas.

Within the Verbandsgemeinde of Eich, Hamm am Rhein has the longest stretch of the Rhine within its limits.

=== Neighbouring municipalities ===
On the Rhineland-Palatinate side, Hamm neighbours the municipality of Eich and Ibersheim, a suburb of the city of Worms. On the Hessian side lies the town of Gernsheim, to which Hamm is linked by ferry.

== History ==
In 782, Hamm had its first documentary mention in the Lorsch codex. The name Hamm means “lying at the river’s side or bend”.

Hamm is mentioned in the Wormser wall-building ordinance from around 900 as one of the places that shared responsibility for maintaining the city wall of Worms.

The epithet “am Rhein” was given the municipality on 1 January 2002.

== Politics ==
=== Municipal council ===
The council is made up of 16 council members, who were elected at the municipal election held on 7 June 2009, and the honorary mayor as chairman.

The municipal election held on 9 June 2024 yielded the following results:

	CDU	SPD	FDP	WGR	Total
1999	2	11	3	–	16 seats
2004	3	10	3	–	16 seats
2009	3	9	4	–	16 seats
2014	2	8	5	1	16 seats
2019	4	7	–	5	16 seats
2024	–	6	–	10	16 seats

=== Coat of arms ===
The municipality's arms might be described thus: Gules three pikes fesswise in pale argent.

The pikes refer to the fishermen's guild, which was well developed in Hamm am Rhein in earlier times.

=== Town partnerships ===
- Varois-et-Chaignot, Côte-d'Or, France, since 1983

== Culture and sightseeing ==
=== The Rhine ===
Near the Rhine and on the Wörth, remains of the original Rhine floodplain landscape have been preserved. Strollers, hikers and nature lovers find here easy access to a network of various paths.

=== Natural monuments ===
Hamm's main landmark is an oaktree, which enjoys conservation status, that stands across from the town hall. This tree was planted on Easter Monday 1872 after the end of the Franco-Prussian War as a token of peace.

=== Sport ===
The indoor-sport departments of the local sport club, SV Rheingold 08 Hamm e.V., such as table tennis and gymnastics, can be found at the municipal hall, making this hall not only a convenient exercise centre for the community but also a venue for many events.

Another attraction is the 18-hole golf course opened in mid October 2000 by the Golfclub Worms at the Hamm-Gernsheim ferry on the former Seibert estate (Seibert'scher Gutshof). At the moment, nine holes can be played, but the rest will soon be opened. Its location in the Rhine floodplain landscape is outstanding.

=== Regular events ===
Each year at the so-called Twelve Apostles, right on the Rhine, an open-air event is held at which followers of various musical genres from near and far meet.

Also every year, the Eichbaumfest (“Oaktree Festival”) around the Hamm Oak.

Moreover, Hamm am Rhein is a regular stop on the outing that makes up part of the yearly “motorcycle blessing” in Eich.

A highlight for the villagers each year is the Maibaumfest – “May Tree Festival” – staged by the local volunteer fire brigade, at which a tree is festively decorated and put up next to the Hamm Oak across from the town hall.

On New Year's Day, people meet in ice-cold weather to go skating on the Schadegrawe.

== Economy and infrastructure ==
In the early 20th century, basket making formed the population's main source of income. Spurred by the Old Rhine – the former Rhine channel from which the river's flow was diverted when it was straightened about 1830 – with its abundant willows, the village grew into a widely known handicraft centre. After the Second World War, this traditional craft was driven out of business by the falling demand for natural basketry.
