= Gimbsheim =

- Municipality
- Coat of arms

- Location of Gimbsheim within Alzey-Worms district
- Interactive map of Gimbsheim
- Location within Germany Location within Rhineland-Palatinate
- Coordinates: 49°46′40″N 08°22′30″E
- Country: Germany
- State: Rhineland-Palatinate
- District: Alzey-Worms
- Municipal assoc.: Eich

Government
  - Mayor (2019–24): Matthias Klös (FW)

Area
  - Total: 17.62 km^{2} (6.80 sq mi)
- Elevation: 85 m (279 ft)

Population (2025-12-31)
  - Total: 3,130
  - Density: 178/km^{2} (460/sq mi)
- Time zone: UTC+01:00 (CET)
  - Summer (DST): UTC+02:00 (CEST)
- Postal codes: 67578
- Dialling codes: 06249
- Vehicle registration: AZ
- Website: www.gimbsheim.de

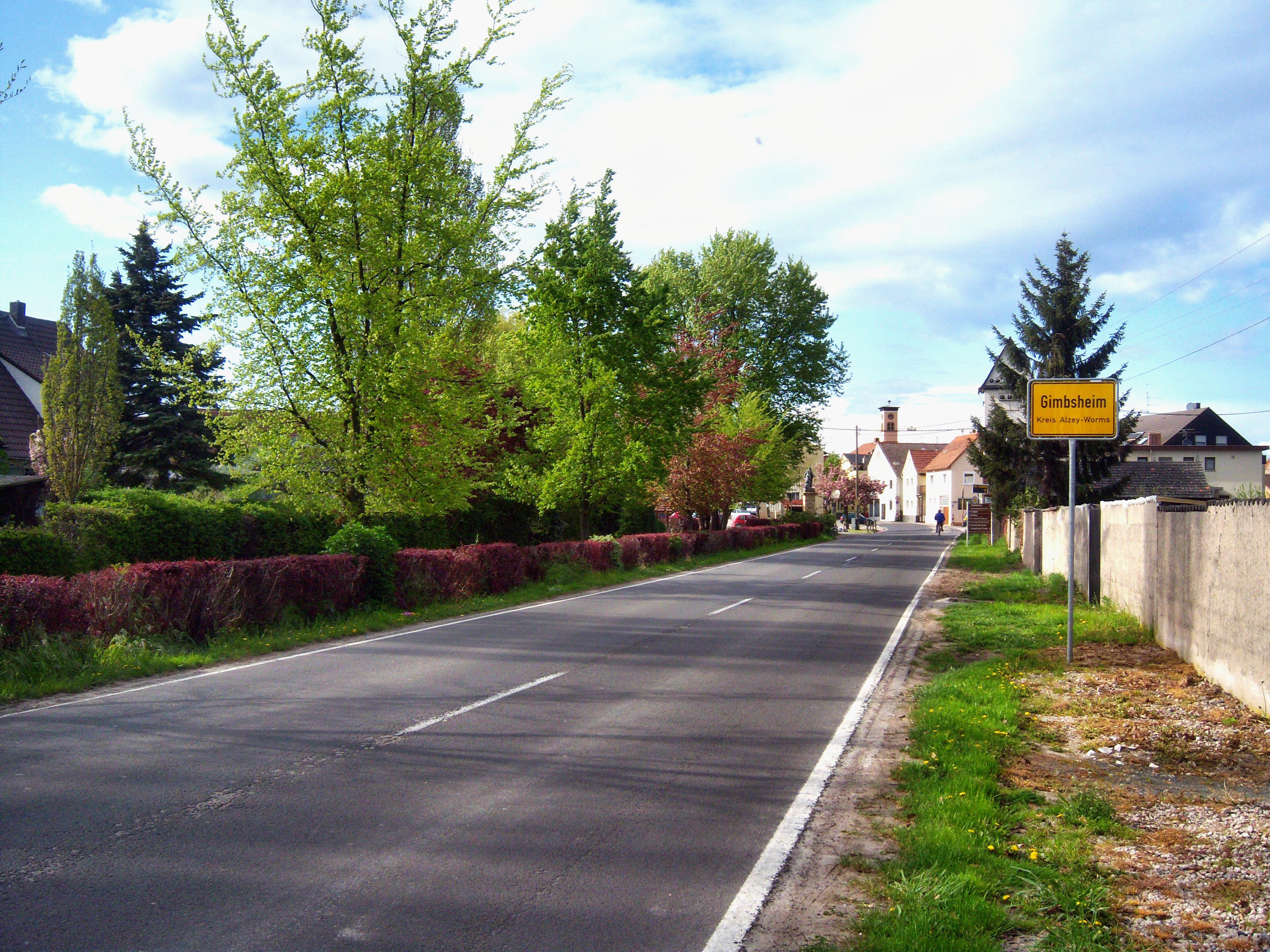
The way into Gimbsheim, coming from Eich

Gimbsheim is an Ortsgemeinde – a municipality belonging to a Verbandsgemeinde, a kind of collective municipality – in the Alzey-Worms district in Rhineland-Palatinate, Germany.

== Geography ==
=== Location ===
The municipality lies in Rhenish Hesse between Worms and Mainz. It belongs to the Verbandsgemeinde of Eich, whose seat is in the like-named municipality.

=== Neighbouring municipalities ===
Gimbsheim borders in the north on the municipality of Guntersblum, in the west on the municipality of Alsheim and in the south on the municipality of Eich. In the east, the municipality of Gimbsheim is bordered by the Rhine.

== History ==
Gimbsheim is believed to have been founded about 500 while the Franks were settling the land under Clovis I by a Frank named Gimmund.

In the beginning, the place was called Gimmundheim. Over the course of the years, the name changed in historical sources, yielding the current name Gimbsheim from Gimmundheim.

On 13 May 766, Gimbsheim, then called Gimmenheim, had its first documentary mention in the Lorsch codex. Two of the villagers donated cropland and vineyards to Lorsch Abbey for their salvation. In 813, another donation, this one to Fulda Abbey, was registered.

It is mentioned in the Wormser wall-building ordinance from around 900 as one of the places that shared responsibility for maintaining the city wall of Worms. From 1194 comes the first documentary mention of a church in Gimbsheim. In 1208, a Gimbsheim clergyman by the name of Heinrich was mentioned as being a member of the Cathedral Chapter at Worms.

In 1402, the Gimbsheim court seal, the Mauricius Siegel was mentioned for the first time. In 1499, Gimbsheim burnt to the ground.

In 1662, Gimbsheim became an Electoral Palatinate holding. Only four years later, in 1666, Gimbsheim was stricken with the Plague.

On 17 October 1704, another great fire in Gimbsheim destroyed a great many homesteads.

Beginning in 1798, all important municipal business was handled through the town hall, not, as it heretofore had been, through the parish register. In 1800 came the first mention of a doctor in Gimbsheim.

Between 1798 and 1814, Gimbsheim was in the Department of Mont-Tonnerre (or Donnersberg in German), belonging at that time to Napoleonic France. In 1830, the Rhine straightening project was carried out along the reach of the river that borders Gimbsheim. The project would eventually encompass the Rhine's course from Basel all the way down to Worms.

In 1974, Gimbsheim opened its outdoor swimming pool. In 1977, the areas left high and dry by the Rhine straightening project in 1830, known as the Altrhein (“Old Rhine”), were made a conservation area.

In 1997, the television series Himmelsheim was filmed in Gimbsheim for Südwestrundfunk. The same year, the Niederrheinhalle (“Lower Rhine Hall”) came to be as a centre for sport and culture.

In 2000, the so-called Pfarrwiesensee, a former gravel quarry that had become a pond, was converted into a bathing lake.

== Religion ==
=== The Jewish community ===
From the latter half of the 19th century until 1933, Gimbsheim was home to a small Jewish community. The Jewish population peaked around the years 1900 and 1905 when there were 72 Jews in the municipality (3% of the total population). On 27 August 1892, a synagogue was dedicated. After 1933, it was sold and converted into a house, which still stands now. At least eight of Gimbsheim's Jews lost their lives after the deportations in National Socialist times.

== Politics ==
=== Municipal council ===
The council is made up of 20 council members, who were elected by proportional representation at the municipal election held on 7 June 2009, and the honorary mayor as chairman.

The municipal election held on 7 June 2009 yielded the following results:

Year	CDU	SPD	FWG	OLfG	Total
2009	2	9	6	3	20 seats
2004	2	8	7	3	20 seats

=== Mayors ===
- Günther Debusi - SPD (... - 1999)
- Jakob Scheller - FWG (1999–2009)
- Peter Kölsch - SPD (2009-2012)
- Amanda Wucher - SPD (2012–2019)
- Matthias Klös - FWG )since 2019)

=== Coat of arms ===
The municipality's arms might be described thus: Gules on a bend argent a cramp sable, in a chief of the third, a bunch of grapes palewise, flanked by four rye stalks, two each side, growing from the top of the bunch of grapes, from which also grow two vine stems, on each side, each ending in a grape leaf, the two leaves further flanking the rye stalks, all Or.

The grain has been blazoned here as rye because Parker identifies rye as being “distinguished from other grain by representing the ear drooping”. Heraldry of the World, on the other hand, identifies the grain as wheat, which along with the grapes appears in the arms to represent the municipality's two main crops.

The charges in the chief, though, seem to be all that there is in the arms that can be directly linked with Gimbsheim. Although the cramp, usually identified in German blazon as a Wolfsangel, was already appearing as a municipal heraldic charge in the 18th century, its origin is unknown. Earlier municipal seals had shown Saint Maurice.

Furthermore, another proposal for municipal arms in 1958, the year when the current arms were adopted, was quite a different design which might be blazoned thus: Argent a cross gules, in dexter chief a roundel Or surmounted by a Moor's head proper. This would have shown a silver shield covered by a red cross, and in the silver space left in the upper dexter (armsbearer's right, viewer's left), a gold circle overlaid with a Black man's head, representing Saint Maurice (who was himself Black).

=== Town partnerships ===
- Talant, Côte-d'Or, France

== Culture and sightseeing ==
=== Regular events ===
For more than 30 years now, Gimbsheim has had a further representative besides its mayor, namely a young and most pretty lady, the Kerweprinzessin (kermis princess). Originally a representative of the Gimbsheim church's consecration, this ecclesiastical custom later grew into the kermis (church consecration festival, locally known as the Kerb or Kerwe). Each kermis princess holds the title for a year, during which she represents her home municipality in other regions. She then has at her side two Festdamen (“festival ladies”) who attend her at many festivals, parades and receptions.

The Gimbsheim kermis is held each year on the last weekend in September. This begins with the traditional raising of the kermis tree by the volunteer fire brigade and the crowning of “Her Majesty”, the new kermis princess. Indeed, it is she who takes on the job of actually opening the Kerwe.

- 2011/2012 Melissa Anna Metzger
- 2010/1011 Marie-Luise Scheller
- 2009/2010 Isabelle Krehl
- 2008/2009 Christina Krost.
- 2007/2008 Christina Staschik
- 2006/2007 Marlie Baglio
- 2005/2006 Bianca Nostadt
- 2004/2005 Nicole Ackermann
- 2003/2004 Jasmin Thiel
- 2002/2003 Marina Wucher

== Economy and infrastructure ==
=== Winegrowing ===
Gimbsheim belongs to the Weinbaubereich Nierstein in Rhenish Hesse. Active in the municipality are 28 winegrowing businesses, and vineyards under cultivation amount to 116 ha. Some 69% of the winegrowing involves white wine varieties of grape (as at 2007). In 1979, there were still 84 such businesses, and vineyards under cultivation amounted to 191 ha.

=== Transport ===
- Running right near the municipality is Bundesstraße 9, which links Ludwigshafen am Rhein with Mainz.
- Until 1969, Gimbsheim had a railway link on the Osthofen–Rheindürkheim–Guntersblum line.
- Gimbsheim is well linked by bus route 432, run by Busverkehr Rhein-Neckar to Guntersblum, the other Altrhein-Gemeinden (“Old Rhine Municipalities”) and Worms.

=== Established businesses ===
- MGL Metro Group Logistics GmbH Co. KG (MGL) with a 50 000 m^{2} central food warehouse for 8,500 articles.
