= Stockstadt =

Stockstadt is the name of at least two places in Germany:

- Stockstadt am Rhein, in Groß-Gerau district, Hesse
- Stockstadt am Main, in Aschaffenburg district, Bavaria
