= Ruchheim =

Suburb in Rhineland-Palatinate, Germany

Coordinates: 49°28′N 8°20′E

Ruchheim (German pronunciation: [ˈʁuːxhaɪm]) is the far western suburb of Ludwigshafen am Rhein located in the Rhineland-Palatinate state of Germany. In the past Ruchheim was typically a small farming town, now however due to housing estates its population has burgeoned to approximately 6,000 inhabitants.

Ruchheim's existence can be traced back to 800 AD when it is mentioned in the Lorsch Codex. It is mentioned in the Wormser wall-building ordinance from around 900 as one of the places that shared responsibility for maintaining the city wall of Worms.
