= Ibersheim =

Worms-Ibersheim
- Stadtteil of Worms
- Interactive map of Worms-Ibersheim
- Location within Germany Location within Rhineland-Palatinate
- Coordinates: 49°43′19″N 08°24′08″E
- Country: Germany
- State: Rhineland-Palatinate
- District: Urban district
- Town: Worms

Area
  - Total: 9.721 km^{2} (3.753 sq mi)
- Elevation: 87–90 m (285–295 ft)

Population (2019-12-31)
  - Total: 713
  - Density: 73.3/km^{2} (190/sq mi)
- Time zone: UTC+01:00 (CET)
  - Summer (DST): UTC+02:00 (CEST)
- Postal codes: 67550
- Dialling codes: 06246

Ibersheim (German: [ˈiːbɐshaɪm], Palatine German pronunciation: [ˈivɛʒm̩]) is the district of Worms (Rhineland-Palatinate) that is furthest from the city centre and the smallest in terms of population.

The small locality has a history going back 1500 years and is situated in a protected area of the Old Rhine.

== History ==
Ibersheim is mentioned in the Wormser wall-building ordinance from around 900 as one of the places that shared responsibility for maintaining the city wall of Worms.

== Geography ==
=== Geographical location ===
Ibersheim is part of the Wonnegau region and borders on the local subdistricts of Worms-Rheindürkheim, Osthofen, Eich (Rhinehessen) and Hamm am Rhein.

In the east, the Rhine forms a 5 km natural subdistrict and federal state border (river kilometres 453.5 to 458.4). The area is part of a former Rhine flood plain in the Upper Rhine Lowlands. With a total area of 972.1 ha, Ibersheim is the fifth-largest of 13 districts of Worms; it occupies 8.9% of the total urban area. The lowest point of Worms is at 86.5 m on Ibersheimer Wörth; the highest point is at 89.5 m by the graveyard.

The Ibersheim subdistrict has been part of the protected landscape Rheinhessisches Rheingebiet since 1977. Rhine floods and low flow have to be expected. The woods Ibersheimer Wäldchen, on the land parcel Mittellache, also called Mittlach, located in a former alluvial forest, have been considered a natural monument since 1966. Other areas worthy of protection with standing water vegetation and birds are on the Ibersheimer Wörth.

=== Water and soil ===
The Rheinaue wetlands and the Old Rhine branches characterise the subdistrict.

Dyke breaches have formed the Altes Loch ("Old Hole", 15 m deep) in 1798 and the Neues Loch ("New Hole") in 1824 through wash-outs.

The arable land is of varying quality. The ground water is good and plentiful (water protection area III B); water levels do, however, vary. The city of Mainz has its water from its own waterworks from the area around Eich. The drinking water of Ibersheim and Hamm has come from the Eich waterworks at Ibersheimer Straße since 1960. On 1 July 2005, a new supply line was opened between the waterworks of Osthofen and Eich and thus Ibersheim is supplied with water of low hardness. Water supply and treatment in Eich were discontinued due to borderline water hardness. Sewage has been going to the sewage treatment plant in Worms since 1984.

=== Climate ===
The locality, like much of Rhine-Hesse, is one of the driest areas in Germany. Annual precipitation is usually below 500 mm. Agriculture relies on artificial irrigation for more.

== Religion ==
Many Christian denominations have had an influence on the village's cultural life over the centuries:

- There has been a (Catholic) parish since the 8th century under the control successively of Lorsch Abbey, the collegiate church of St. Paul in Worms, the Teutonic Order, the counts of Leiningen, the counts of Sickingen and the Electorate of the Palatinate. In 829, Gerhelm the priest gave Lorsch Abbey "everything that I have owned here (in Ibersheim)".
- From 1556, all subjects had to assume the religion of their sovereign, the Protestant Lutheran religion of the Elector Ottheinrich. The denomination subsequently changed a number of times in the Electorate of the Palatinate.
- From around 1650, the region was host to reformists from Gelderland, religious refugees from the Archduchy of Innsbruck, the Kingdom of Bohemia, and the free County of Waldeck as well as from the Electorate of Mainz and the County of Hanau.
- In spring of 1661, there was a major wave of economic and religious refugees from Switzerland's Zürich region, whom the Elector allowed to settle in the region.
- In 1671, a mass emigration of Mennonites from the Bern region occurred. Of all the Mennonites worldwide, around 10% originate in this region.
- In 1671, a reformed church community with 50 members is mentioned.
- In October 1693, 12 Mennonite families including 3 hereditary tenants, all of Swiss origin, went into exile to Friedrichstadt (Schleswig-Holstein), where there was a settlement of Anabaptists. They returned to Ibersheim only after the end of the War of the Palatine Succession, or the Nine Years' War, in April 1698.
- From around 1900, the majority of the population have been Lutherans.

Population distribution by religion/denomination
Year	Protestant	Catholic	Mennonite	Jewish	Free Prot.	Total
1816	108	33	211	0	0	352
1824	116	32	208	0	0	356
1834	92	57	206	60	0	415
1900	134	25	102	0	2	263
1910	164	13	78	0	3	258

The Jews mentioned in 1834 were travelling masons who built a number of farm buildings.

From 1933 to 1939, the population rose from 277 to 519 because of the Arbeitsmänner (working men) in the Reichsarbeitsdienst (labour service) camp (RAD camp).

=== Parishes ===
- The Ibersheim Mennonite parish has been in existence since 1661 and is part of the Arbeitsgemeinschaft Südwestdeutscher Mennonitengemeinden (ASM), which in turn is a member of the Arbeitsgemeinschaft Mennonitischer Gemeinden in Deutschland (AMG).
- The Ibersheim Protestant parish has been pastorally linked to Hamm since 1857.
- The Roman Catholics are overseen by the parish in Eich. Services are also held in a church in Hamm.

=== Religious buildings ===
The following religious building are known throughout the town's long history:

- St. Dionysius' church in the graveyard: first mentioned in 1252; the right of patronage lay with the collegiate church of St. Paul in Worms. After it had fallen into disrepair, the remains of the foundation were used to build the Catholic church in Eich in 1736.
- St. Elisabeth's chapel in the castle: mentioned in 1496 at the Synod of Worms; in the Catholic church in Eich, the two patron saints of Ibersheim are immortalised on the high altar (1911).
- Reformed church: first mentioned in 1671, with 50 members
- Mennonite church in Ibersheim: built in 1836 for the parish that had been in existence since 1661; today, it is one of Germany's best-known Mennonite churches

== Culture and places of interest ==
=== Buildings ===
The following buildings are registered for historic preservation:

- Mennonite church (Kirchplatz 1): 1836, currently the only Mennonite church in Germany with a bell tower
- Foster mother's/Almshouse ("Ammeheisje") (Killenfeldstraße 6): timbered house from 1788, today it accommodates the museum of local history with "Geldschisser" and "Deichschließe"
- Schafscheuern: around 1800, five barns, one of which was turned into the fire station in 1992

The designated historic district includes the entire original fortified town center and adjacent streets:

- Castle (Electorate of the Palatinate administrative building) (castle courtyard/Menno-Simons-Straße 10): building permit 1417, conversion and extension in 1469, 1481 and after 1550, probably a large bakery for Napoleonic troops, oldest of the four castles in Worms
- Former bridge gate to the castle with watch/signal tower with embrasures (Menno-Simons-Straße 12): renovated in 1771 by Daniel and Heinrich Stauffer
- Corner house in the south east of the town fortification (Hinterhofstraße 10): served as first shelter for the Mennonites who arrived in 1661. - In 1713 built this current building Johann Georg Brubacher (1686 - 1753), later the secretary of William Penn.
- In 1716, three barns were built as town fortification by Hans Jacob Forrer, Peter Opmann and Henrich Naef. One of three 300-year-old barns of cultural and historical value is situated along the distinctive north-east corner of the former town fortification and was converted after 2000 for commercial purposes. During the restructuring works, 17 roof windows in two sizes were put into the two roof surfaces and the outside walls were painted white. Ignorance and a lack of expert advice and collaboration between the monument protection authority and the owner resulted in cultural sacrilege, and it is likely to survive as an instance of cultural outrage.
- The oldest surviving farm (Im Fuchseck 3) was built by Peter Opmann; the barn was built in 1716 and the house in 1717. Until the completion of the church in 1836, the house served as meeting place for the Mennonites and accommodated the village smithy until the 1950s.
- Town fortification with ring of houses: formerly with two gates, two passageways and one gateway
- Houses and farmstead in the old town centre (listed building zone): around 1800
- Former distillery (Menno-Simons-Str. 8): (one of 27, around 1850), built in 1811 by Abraham Forrer and Elisabeth Bergtold
- Thee-sided/four-sided farms Wormser/Rheindürkheimer Straße: built around 1830-50
- Inn "Rheinischer Hof" (Menno-Simons-Str. 19): built around 1848, sold to the municipality in 1907 by Johann Stauffer VI.
- Birth house of Bertha Laisé (today Hammer Straße 2), married to Dr. med. Adam Karrillon
- Municipal administration, Kindergarten, practice room of the sport club: with coat of arms of Fritz Kehr, built in 1958/59
- Cemetery hall with Dance-of-Death painting Totentanz, painting by Fritz Kehr, built 1973-75, bell tower erected in 1999.

=== Sport ===
- Sports club Ibersheim (SCI), founded in 1953, has a broad range of offers including table tennis, football, gymnastics, Ju Jutsu, cycling and singing. The club organises cultural events.

=== Organisations ===
- Spar- und Darlehnskasse eGmbH, founded in 1903; in 1970, the business fields were divided and merged with cooperatives in Hamm; then set up of a branch of Volksbank Worms-Wonnegau, Osthofen und Raiffeisen-Warengenossenschaft Hamm/Worms-Ibersheim e.G.
- Compulsory fire brigade from 1928, volunteer fire brigade from 1936, today with youth fire brigade
- Local SPD group, founded in 1946
- Arbeiterwohlfahrt (workers welfare association), local group founded in 1979, with AWO Jugendwerk
- Heimatverein e. V., founded in 1989
- Local CDU group Rheindürkheim-Ibersheim
- Farmers club in the German Farmers' Union
- Water and soil association
- Hunting society

=== Events ===
The local fair (Kirchweih) is held on feast of the Assumption of Mary (15 August) or on the weekend following it. The religious holiday (statutory in Catholic federal states and regions), also called "Iwerschemer Kerb", is mostly secular in character. Since the town's incorporation, the "Nachkerb" is no longer celebrated because that weekend marks the beginning of the "Backfischfest" (fried fish festival) in Worms, which is known throughout the region and beyond. The Kerb fair marks the end of the grain harvest and midsummer.

Until World War II, the day after Boxing Day (27 December) was known as Gesindetermin ("servants' day"). In farming, this was the day when the servants were exchanged and when the craftsmen presented the farm owners with their annual bill.
