= Mettenheim, Rhineland-Palatinate =

Mettenheim
- Municipality
- Coat of arms

- Location of Mettenheim within Alzey-Worms district
- Interactive map of Mettenheim
- Location within Germany Location within Rhineland-Palatinate
- Coordinates: 49°44′24″N 8°19′33″E
- Country: Germany
- State: Rhineland-Palatinate
- District: Alzey-Worms
- Municipal assoc.: Eich

Government
  - Mayor (2024–29): Wilfried Eichner

Area
  - Total: 6.41 km^{2} (2.47 sq mi)
- Elevation: 87 m (285 ft)

Population (2025-12-31)
  - Total: 1,591
  - Density: 248/km^{2} (643/sq mi)
- Time zone: UTC+01:00 (CET)
  - Summer (DST): UTC+02:00 (CEST)
- Postal codes: 67582
- Dialling codes: 06242
- Vehicle registration: AZ
- Website: www.mettenheim-rlp.de

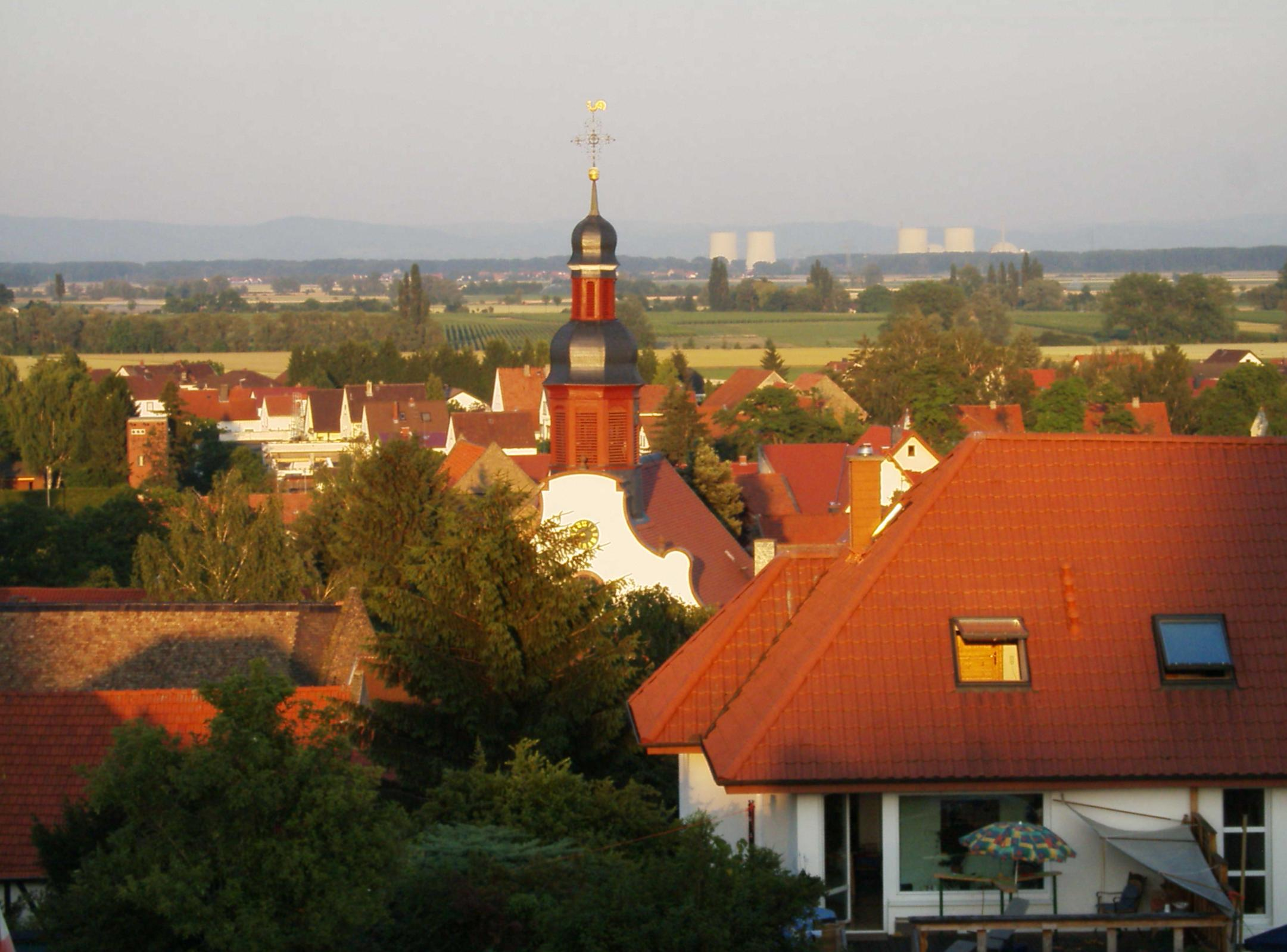
Mettenheim

Mettenheim (German pronunciation: [ˈmɛtn̩haɪm]) is an Ortsgemeinde – a municipality belonging to a Verbandsgemeinde, a kind of collective municipality – in the Alzey-Worms district in Rhineland-Palatinate, Germany.

== Geography ==
=== Location ===
The municipality lies in Rhenish Hesse between Worms and Mainz. It belongs to the Verbandsgemeinde of Eich, whose seat is in the like-named municipality.

=== Climate ===
Yearly precipitation in Mettenheim amounts to 558 mm, which is low, falling into the lowest fourth of the precipitation chart for all Germany. Only at 12% of the German Weather Service's weather stations are even lower figures recorded. The driest month is January. The most rainfall comes in July. In that month, precipitation is twice what it is in January. Precipitation varies moderately. At 51% of the weather stations, lower seasonal swings are recorded.

== History ==
Mettenheim was mentioned as early as 873 in the Descriptio Wormatiensis civitatis as a Roman colony. It was originally held by the Bishop of Worms, but, still in early times, the Counts of Leiningen were enfeoffed with it, later counting it as being among their ancestral holdings. Towards the end of the 17th century, the village ended up in the Frankfurt merchant Canpoing's ownership, from whom it then passed to the Counts of Wartenberg. In 1393, a castle at Mettenheim was mentioned, whose owners, the Chamberlains and Knights of Fleckenstein, sold it at that time to the City of Worms.

== Politics ==
=== Municipal council ===
The council is made up of 16 council members and the honorary mayor as chairman.

The municipal elections have yielded the following results:

	CDU	FWG	Loibl	BLM	Total
2024	6	10	0	0	16 seats
2019	5	11	0	0	16 seats
2014	7	9	0	0	16 seats
2009	2	6	2	6	16 seats

=== Town partnerships ===
- Pupillin, Jura, France
- (Germany) Mettenheim, Bavaria

=== Coat of arms ===
The municipality's arms might be described thus: Argent a talon barwise lopped, the toes to chief, azure.

== Culture and sightseeing ==
=== Buildings ===
In 2007, the crypt of the Counts of Wartenberg was opened to the public after renovation.

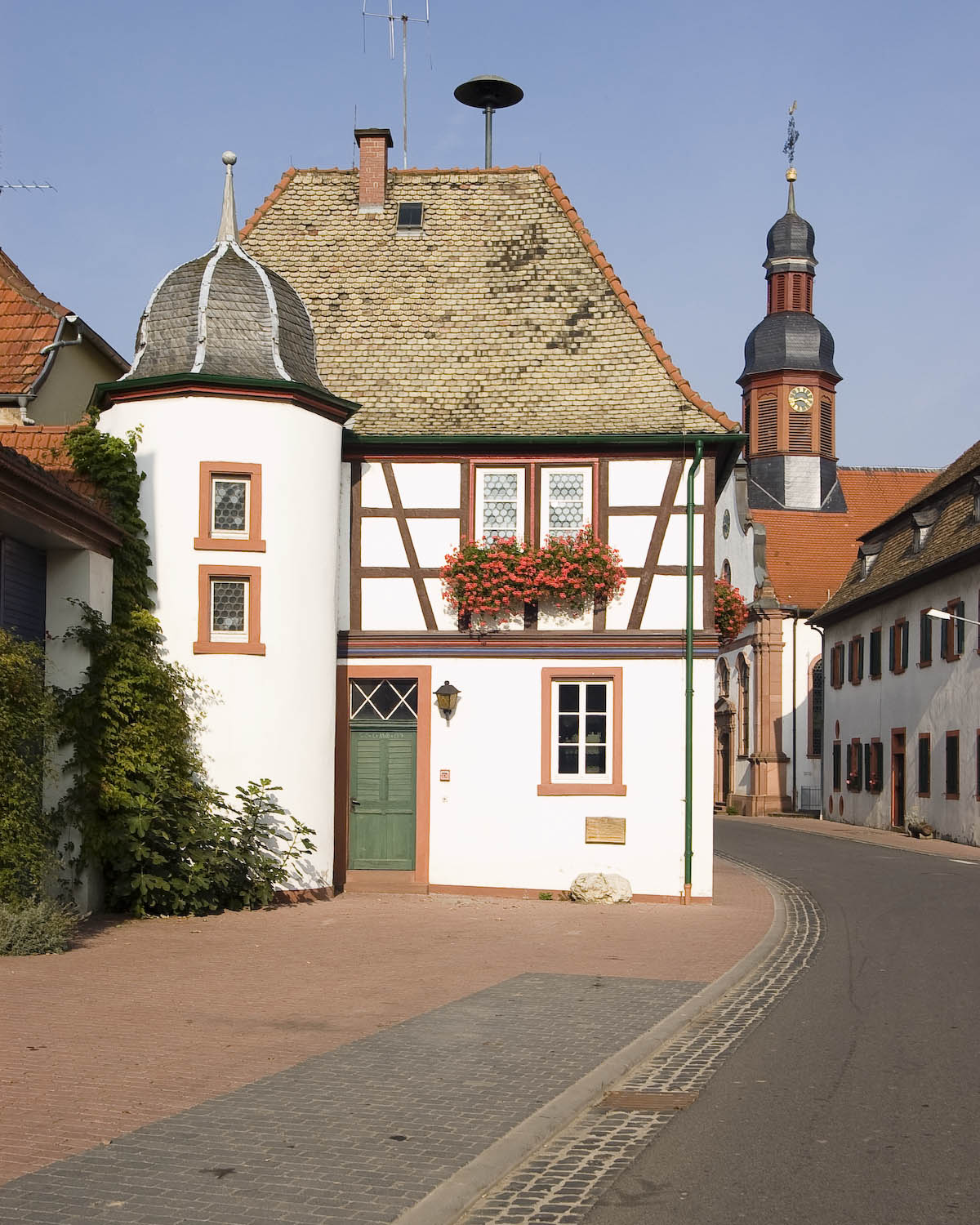
Mettenheim town hall

== Economy and infrastructure ==
About half of the usable agricultural land of 540 ha in Mettenheim is planted with vineyards. The vineyards are sheltered from the wind on the typical Wonnegau terraces. There are 34 businesses that earn their living wholly from winegrowing. Mettenheim lies in the Nierstein zone of the Rhenish Hesse wine region and bears the winemaking appellations Michelsberg, Schloßberg and Goldberg.

=== Transport ===
- Running right near the municipality is Bundesstraße 9, which links Ludwigshafen am Rhein with Mainz.
- Mettenheim has a railway station on the Mainz–Ludwigshafen line with very good connections.

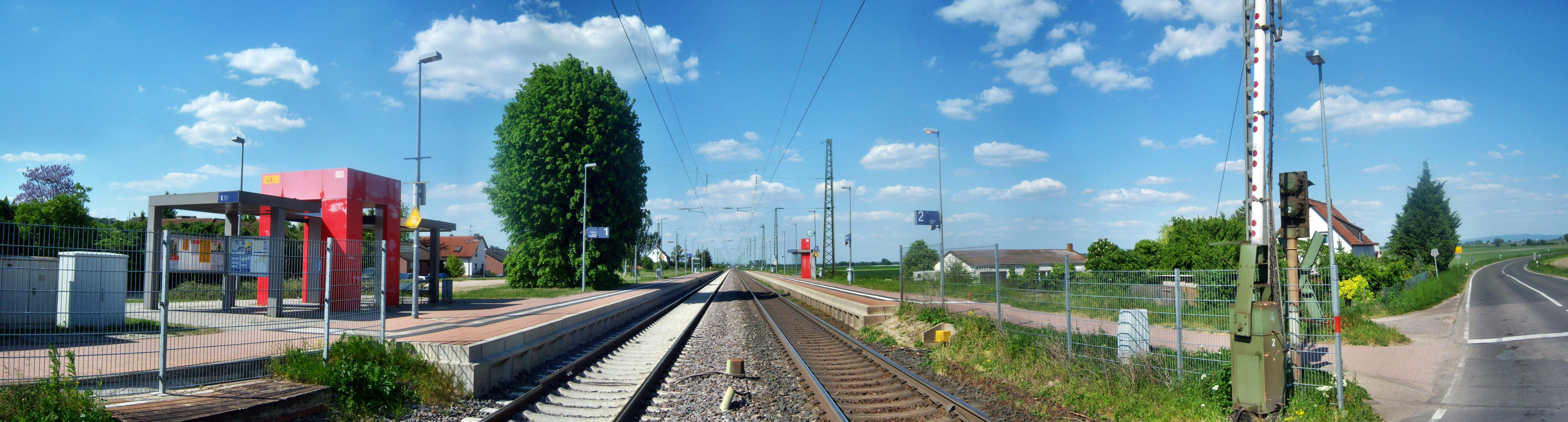
Mettenheim station

== Famous people ==
Jacob Best.Sr (1786–1861) was born in Hesse-Darmstadt where he learned the brewing trade, later running a small brewery in Mettenheim. He later founded one of the forerunners of the Pabst Brewing Company in Milwaukee after his emigration in 1844 to join his sons.
