= Stockstadt am Rhein =

- Municipality
- Coat of arms

- Location of Stockstadt am Rhein within Groß-Gerau district
- Interactive map of Stockstadt am Rhein
- Location within Germany Location within Hesse
- Coordinates: 49°49′N 8°28′E
- Country: Germany
- State: Hesse
- Admin. region: Darmstadt
- District: Groß-Gerau

Government
  - Mayor (2020–26): Thomas Raschel (CDU)

Area
  - Total: 18.72 km^{2} (7.23 sq mi)
- Elevation: 112 m (367 ft)

Population (2025-12-31)
  - Total: 5,950
  - Density: 318/km^{2} (823/sq mi)
- Time zone: UTC+01:00 (CET)
  - Summer (DST): UTC+02:00 (CEST)
- Postal codes: 64589
- Dialling codes: 06158
- Vehicle registration: GG
- Website: www.stockstadt.de

Stockstadt am Rhein is a municipality in Groß-Gerau district in Hesse, Germany, lying on the southern edge of the Frankfurt Rhein-Main Region.

== Geography ==
=== Location ===
Stockstadt lies in the Rhine rift right on the Kühkopf-Knoblochsaue EU reserve. The community lies at the mouth of the Modau, where it empties into the Rhine.

=== Neighbouring communities ===
Stockstadt borders in the north and east on the town of Riedstadt, in the south on the community of Biebesheim and in the west on the communities of Gimbsheim (Alzey-Worms) and Guntersblum (Mainz-Bingen).

=== Constituent communities ===
Stockstadt consists of only one centre.

== History ==
Stockstadt had its first documentary mention in 830-850 in the Lorsch codex under the name Stochestat.

== Politics ==
=== Municipal council ===
Municipal council is made up of 23 councillors, with seats apportioned thus, in accordance with municipal elections held on 12 March 2021:

- CDU 11 seats (45.67%)
- SPD 8 seats (35.00%)
- Greens 4 seats (19.33%)

Voter participation was 43.90%.

=== Coat of arms ===
Stockstadt's civic coat of arms might heraldically be described thus: In gules two boat hooks per saltire argent, thereabout four six-pointed stars argent.

The boat hooks refer to boatmen on the Rhine, but it is unknown what the stars are meant to stand for. The arms are based on the community's oldest known seal from the late 16th century, and were officially conferred in 1927 in Mainz colours. This is a reference to the community's history as an old (until 1579) Mainz domain.

=== Partnerships ===
- Villa Lagarina, Italy, since 1990

== Economy and infrastructure ==
=== Transport ===
Stockstadt lies on Federal Highway (Bundesstraße) B 44 (Frankfurt am Main - Ludwigshafen). The Autobahn interchange Pfungstadt-West on the A 67 (Rüsselsheim – Viernheim) is about 9 km away.

The community is also a stop on the Mannheim–Frankfurt railway.

=== Education ===
- Grundschule Stockstadt (primary school)
