= Weingut Brüder Dr. Becker =

German wine grower and craft producer

- Location: Ludwigshöhe, Germany
- Appellation: Rheinhessen
- Key people: Lotte Pfeffer-Müller, Hans Müller
- Varietal: Riesling
- Website: brueder-dr-becker.de

Brüder Dr. Becker

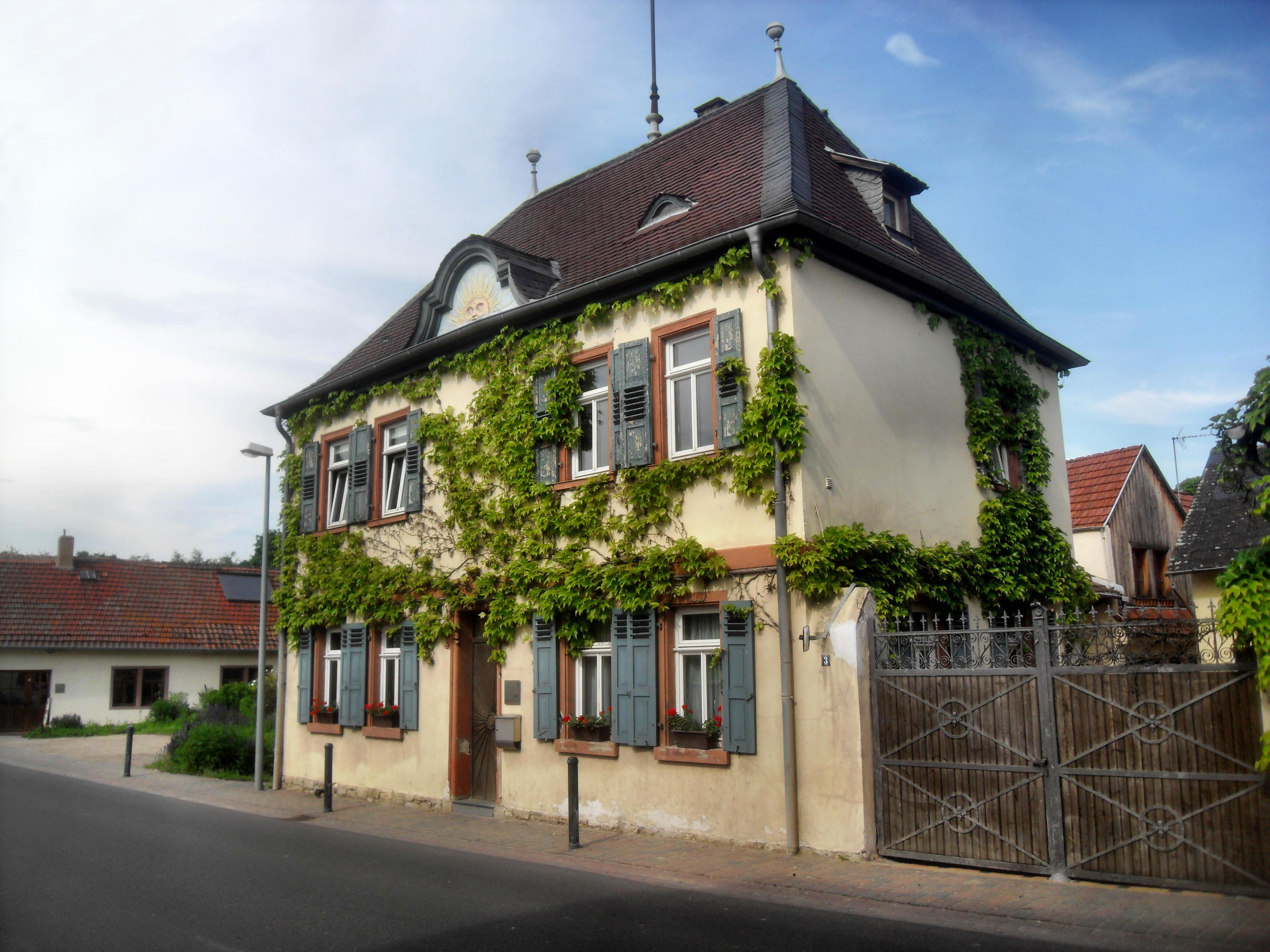
The estate of Weingut Brüder Dr. Becker

Weingut Brüder Dr. Becker is a German wine grower and craft producer based in Ludwigshöhe, in the Rheinhessen wine region, Germany. Weingut Brüder Dr. Becker is a member of the Verband Deutscher Prädikatsweingüter (VDP) since 1971.

== History ==
The Becker family winery was founded in the middle of the 19th century. Later, as bricklayer Franz Becker was involved in the renovation of the Katharinenkirche, Oppenheim after the merger of the Lutheran and Reformed congregation in 1822 and his brother Johann Becker, working as an advocate in the administration of the Grand Duchy of Hesse became the eponymous owners. But it was after World War II when the family focussed on wine growing in the Ludwigshöhe estate.

The owners started the environmentally sustainable turnaround already in the 1970s and changed over to organic viticulture. The winery is one of the founding members of the Rheinhessen regional syndicate of the Ecovin movement, the oldest regional association of the German association of organic viticulture (Ecovin). Lotte Pfeffer-Müller is its chief executive officer. Since 2008 also Demeter certification program was implemented in the estates philosophy.

The estate house of the winery Brüder Dr. Becker, in the Mainzer Straße 3 consists of a four-sided yard whose main house has a hipped roof building, partly with timberframe. It was erected around 1830. A baroque transformation took place around 1896. The buildings are classified as cultural monument of the local community of Ludwigshöhe in Rhineland-Palatinate.

== Vineyards and wine ==
Dr. Becker works with 11 hectares vineyards in the hilly southern Rhenish Hesse. The individual sites Falkenberg, Paterhof and Tafelstein (Dienheim), as well as Teufelskopf (Ludwigshöhe) are located in the fertile glacial Upper Rhine Plain, with its gentle slopes and almost Mediterranean climate. Some of these are selected sites, capable to produce ″Grosses Gewächs″, top-level dry wines.

The leading grape variety is Riesling, which accounts for 40% of the cultivated area, followed by Silvaner, which is typical for Rheinhessen and accounts for 20%, Scheurebe, Müller-Thurgau, Gewürztraminer and white Burgundy varieties (Pinot blanc, Pinot gris) in the white wine spectrum, and Pinot noir and Regent as red varieties. Following success with the partially resistant Regent grape variety, the fungus-resistant Souvignier gris grape variety was added to the list of grape varieties.
