= Descriptio Wormatiensis civitatis =

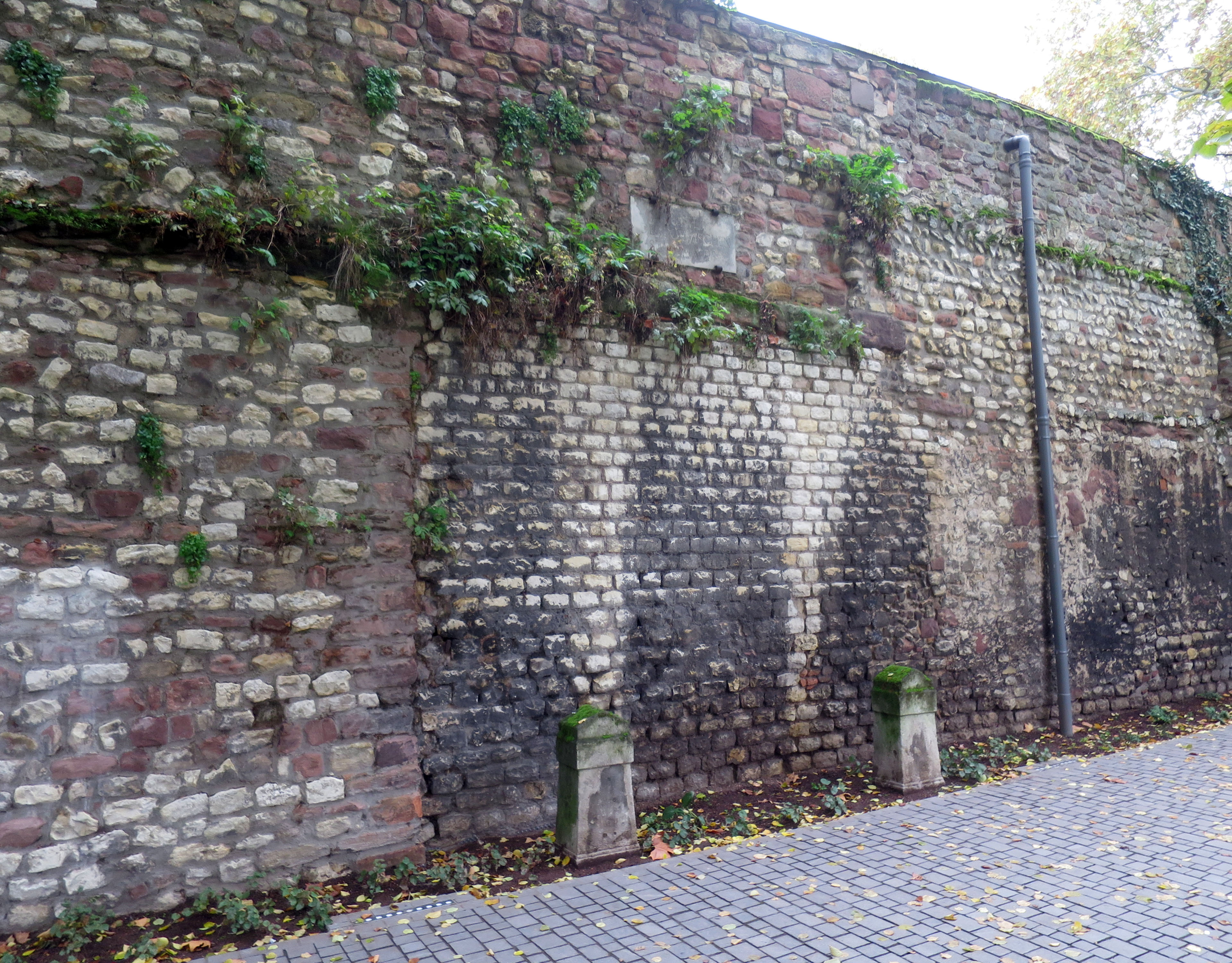
A Roman section of wall at Worms surrounded by medieval work

The Descriptio Wormatiensis civitatis ('description of the city of Worms'), also known as the Wormser Mauerbauordnung ('wall-building ordinance of Worms'), is an ordinance from about 900 concerning the maintenance of the city wall of Worms, Germany.

== Manuscript and editions ==
The Descriptio, which is written in Latin, is preserved in the Wormser Chronik of Friedrich Zorn. Zorn's work, which dates to 1576, combines material from several sources, including the Annales Wormatienses and the Chronicon Wormatiense. The combined Descriptio, Annales and Chronicon were published under the title Annales Wormatienses by G. H. Pertz. The disentangling of the medieval texts combined in Zorn's was done by Heinrich Boos. The Descriptio has been published three times: by Pertz, by Boos and by Van De Kieft and Niermeyer.

== Content ==
The ordinance appears in the manuscript under the rubric Descriptio Wormatiensis civitatis facta a Theodolacho episcopo Wormatiensi anno 873, qui obiit in Neuweiller anno 914 kal. sept., episcopatus anno quadrageismo primo, "a description of the city of Worms made in the year 873 [sic] by Thietlach, bishop of Worms, who died in Neuweiler in the year 914 on 1 September, in the forty-first year of his episcopate".

Issued by Bishop Thietlach (r. 891–914), the Descriptio is more than a description. It is an ordinance assigning Mauerbaupflicht, i.e., the construction and upkeep of specific sections of wall, to both neighbourhoods within Worms and the villages or manors outside it. The ordinance is a unique witness for its place and time. Lynette Olson calls it "a glimpse of transalpine urban life at its nadir, but still organised".

== Places mentioned ==
The following places are mentioned in the Descriptio:

- Friesenquartier
- Rudelsheim
- Gimbsheim
- Eich
- Hamm
- Ibersheim
- Rheindürckheim
- Alsheim
- Mettenheim
- Rheinquartier
- Murbach Abbey
- Pfauenpforte
- Heimgereide
- Bobenheim
- Ligrisheim
- Roxheim
- Oggersheim
- Hemmingesheim
- Ruchheim
- Karlbach
- Kirchheim
- Andreaspforte
- Eisbach
- Mertesheim
- Martinspforte
- Pfrimm
- Mühlbach
- Monzernheim
- Dienheim
