= Alsheim =

- Municipality
- Coat of arms

- Location of Alsheim within Alzey-Worms district
- Interactive map of Alsheim
- Location within Germany Location within Rhineland-Palatinate
- Coordinates: 49°46′02″N 08°20′31″E
- Country: Germany
- State: Rhineland-Palatinate
- District: Alzey-Worms
- Municipal assoc.: Eich

Government
  - Mayor (2019–24): Robert Kolig (CDU)

Area
  - Total: 15.54 km^{2} (6.00 sq mi)
- Elevation: 89 m (292 ft)

Population (2025-12-31)
  - Total: 2,700
  - Density: 170/km^{2} (450/sq mi)
- Time zone: UTC+01:00 (CET)
  - Summer (DST): UTC+02:00 (CEST)
- Postal codes: 67577
- Dialling codes: 06249
- Vehicle registration: AZ
- Website: www.alsheim.de

Alsheim is an Ortsgemeinde – a municipality belonging to a Verbandsgemeinde, a kind of collective municipality – in the Alzey-Worms district in Rhineland-Palatinate, Germany.

== History ==
Alsheim is mentioned in the Wormser wall-building ordinance from around 900 as one of the places that shared responsibility for maintaining the city wall of Worms.

== Geography ==
=== Location ===
The municipality lies in Rhenish Hesse and belongs to the Verbandsgemeinde of Eich, whose seat is in the like-named municipality. The village, along with the hamlet of Hangen-Wahlheim, lies amidst vineyards at the foot of the Rhenish-Hessian Rhine terraces between Mainz and Worms. Favoured as it is by its central location between the Frankfurt Rhine Main Region and the Rhine-Neckar conurbations, Alsheim has for a long time been growing into a markedly residential community. New housing developments will further strengthen this trend. Nevertheless, winegrowing still defines the village's character. With more than 700 ha of vineyard, Alsheim is one of Rhenish Hesse's most important winegrowing centres in Germany's biggest wine region. The wines, overwhelmingly from traditional white and red varieties of grape, are widely known for their quality. Hiking trails and a wine heritage trail, together with cycle paths, connect the countryside. There are several inns and winemaking estates. The village is well linked by rail and road to, among other places, Mainz, Oppenheim, Worms, Speyer and Heidelberg.

== Politics ==
=== Municipal council ===
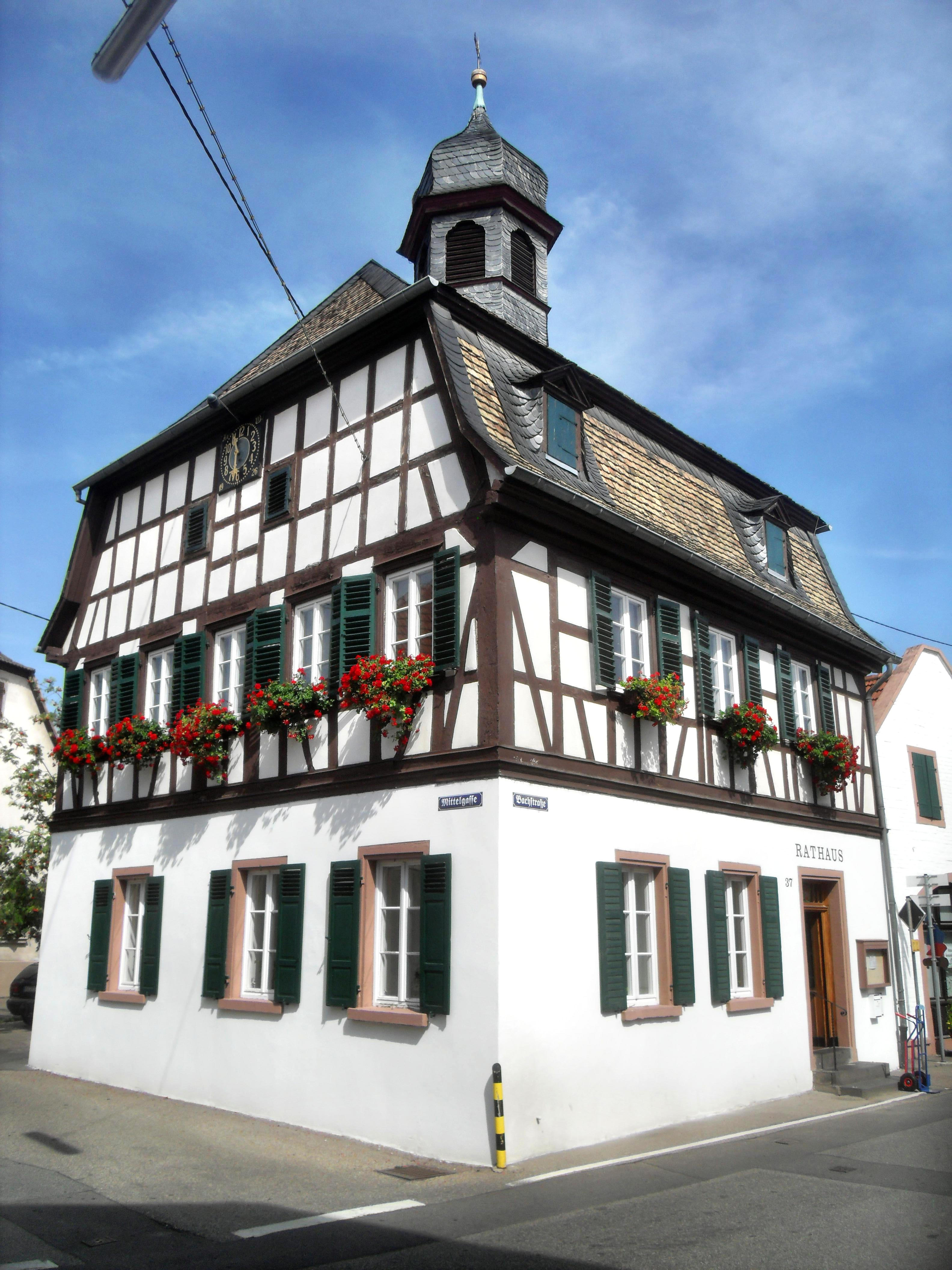
Alsheim town hall

The council is made up of 20 council members, with the honorary mayor as chairman, and with seats apportioned thus:

| | SPD | CDU | FWG | Total |
| 2009 | 5 | 9 | 6 | 20 seats |
| 2004 | 5 | 7 | 8 | 20 seats |

(as at municipal election held on 7 June 2009)

=== Coat of arms ===
The municipality's arms might be described thus: Azure two bishop's croziers in saltire, each with a sudarium fringed Or.

=== Town partnerships ===
- Pesmes, Haute-Saône, France
- (Germany) Nossen, Saxony

== Economy and infrastructure ==
A considerable portion of Alsheim's character rests on winegrowing, and with 704 ha of vineyards currently worked, 69.3% with white wine varieties and 30.7% with red, it ranks fifth after Worms (1 490 ha), Nierstein (783 ha), Alzey (769 ha) and Westhofen (764 ha) among Rhenish Hesse's biggest winegrowing centres. It is also one of the biggest in the whole of Rhineland-Palatinate.

A peculiarity in Alsheim's landscape is to be found in its broad network of sunken lanes. They stretch on for 11.5 km within the municipal area and were carved into the surrounding land by centuries of human activity wearing the land down. They are available for hiking and walking even today. In the summer months, there are sunken lane tours on offer, and for avid photographers, also photo excursions.

=== Transport ===
Alsheim lies right on Bundesstraße 9, on the main Worms-Mainz tangential road. Reachable within a few minutes are the Autobahnen A 63 through the Biebelnheim interchange and A 61 through the Worms/Mörrstadt or Gundersheim interchange.

In the heart of Alsheim can be found a railway station, from which travellers can ride VRN and DB trains directly to Worms and Mainz.

=== Education ===
- Grundschule am Sonnenberg (primary school)

== Famous people associated with the municipality ==
- Economic adviser Reinhard Muth, Mayor of Alsheim, President of the German Winegrowing Association and Vice-President of the Assembly of European Winegrowing Regions (AREV), Senior Chief of Rappenhof Wine Estate.
