= Trebur =

- Municipality
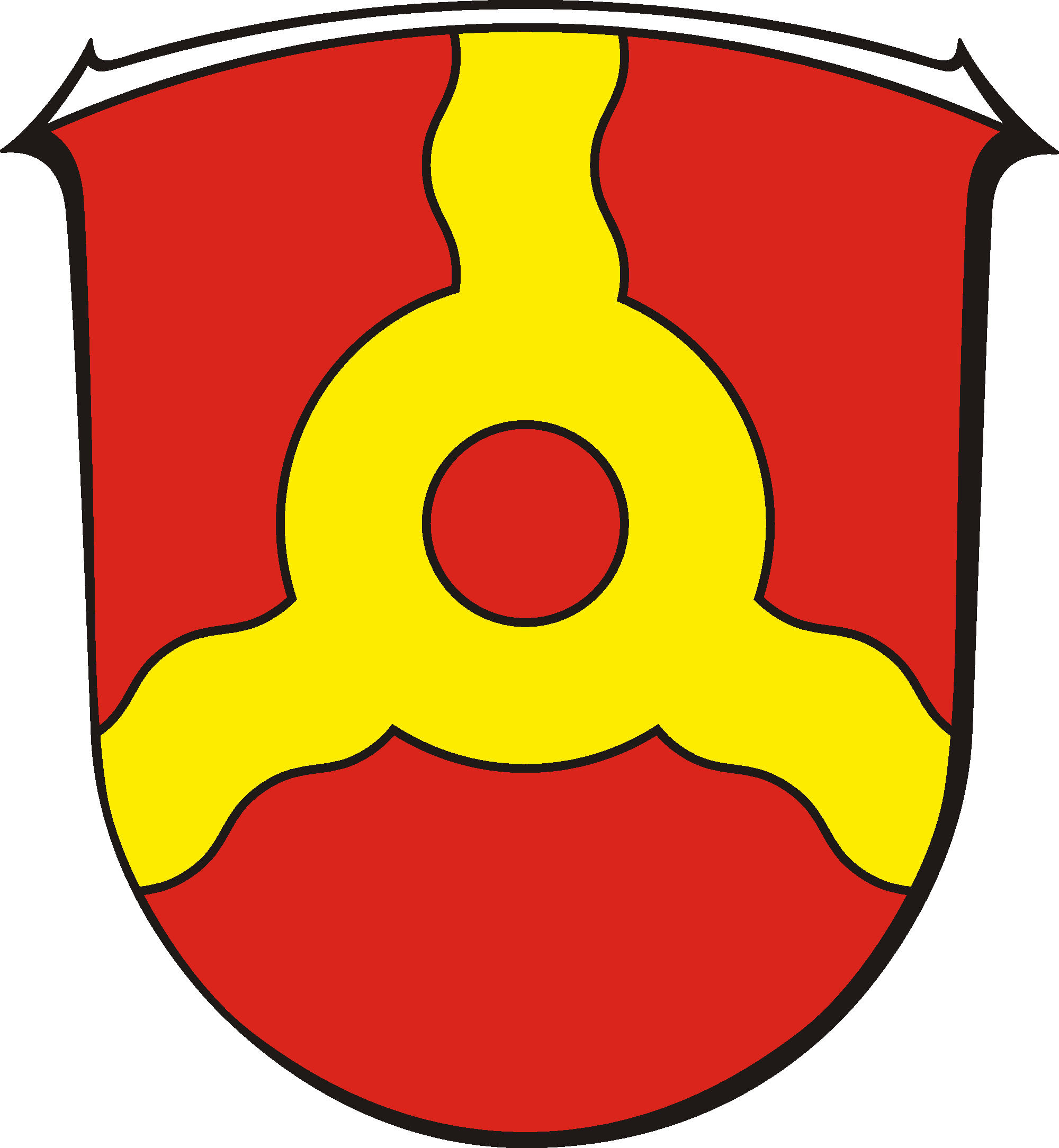
- Coat of arms

- Location of Trebur within Groß-Gerau district
- Interactive map of Trebur
- Location within Germany Location within Hesse
- Coordinates: 49°55′30″N 08°24′20″E
- Country: Germany
- State: Hesse
- Admin. region: Darmstadt
- District: Groß-Gerau

Government
  - Mayor (2019–25): Jochen Engel

Area
  - Total: 50.14 km^{2} (19.36 sq mi)
- Elevation: 85 m (279 ft)

Population (2025-12-31)
  - Total: 12,702
  - Density: 253.3/km^{2} (656.1/sq mi)
- Time zone: UTC+01:00 (CET)
  - Summer (DST): UTC+02:00 (CEST)
- Postal codes: 65468
- Dialling codes: 06147
- Vehicle registration: GG
- Website: www.trebur.de

Trebur is a municipality in Groß-Gerau district in Hessen, Germany. It is 13 km southeast of Mainz, and 8 km south of Rüsselsheim.

== Geography ==
=== Location ===
Trebur is located in the Frankfurt Rhein-Main Region. The cities of Mainz, Wiesbaden, Frankfurt am Main, and Darmstadt are located within 30 km of Trebur.

=== Neighbouring communities ===
Trebur borders in the North upon the community of Ginsheim-Gustavsburg and the town of Rüsselsheim, in the East upon the community of Nauheim and the town of Groß-Gerau, in the South upon the town of Riedstadt, and in the West upon the town of Oppenheim and the communities of Nierstein, Nackenheim and Bodenheim (all four in Mainz-Bingen).

=== Constituent communities ===
Trebur consists of the four communities of Astheim, Geinsheim, Hessenaue and Trebur, as well as the rural area of Kornsand, and is home to some 13,000 inhabitants in 3,500 households.

== History ==
Trebur's first documentary mention came in 829 in one of King Louis the Pious's documents. Since the 9th century, a Pfalz, or Imperial Palace, has stood in Trebur. It arose from a royal court with an extensive taxation region, to which belonged, among other places, the constituent community of Astheim. Between 829 and 1077, 57 kingly stays are known to have taken place, a few of which are notable in the Empire's history. The Council of Tribur was held in this city in May 895. King Henry IV was especially strongly connected to Trebur. He was elected King here in 1053, and he also wed here in 1066. In 1076 he was forced by opposing princes at the Fürstentag in Trebur to settle his conflict with the Pope, which gave rise to Henry's "Walk to Canossa".

Trebur subsequently lost its importance as a royal court. Other than the anti-king (Gegenkönig) Rudolf of Rheinfeld, no other king ever visited the Pfalz again. Together with the Pfalz, Trebur was pledged to the County of Katzenelnbogen in 1248. The pledge was never honoured, and the Counts managed to acquire further sovereign rights in 1422. The Katzenelnbogen inheritance passed along with Trebur to the Landgraviate of Hesse in 1479.

Together with Astheim and Geinsheim, Trebur became part of the Hessian Amt of Dornberg, from which arose in 1932 the Groß-Gerau district.

== Politics ==
=== Coat of arms ===
The charge in Trebur's civic coat of arms is a symbol that first appeared on village limit markers in the 18th century, and then on the mayor's chain of office in the next century. Its origin, however, is unknown, although it has been suggested that it might symbolize the local geography, to wit, the meeting of the rivers Rhine, Neckar and Main.

=== Partnerships ===
- Verneuil-sur-Avre, France, département of Eure, since 1982

== Sundry ==
In Trebur stands the T1T, which with a 120 cm-diameter mirror is one of Europe's biggest telescopes open to the public. The T1T is run by the Trebur Astronomy Foundation's (Astronomie Stiftung Trebur) Michael Adrian Observatory.

In Trebur begins the Hessian stretch of the Deutsche Fachwerkstraße or "German Half-Timbered Road". Actually a series of different roads, it highlights Germany's many examples of half-timbered houses and buildings.

== Personalities ==
- Gerold Reichenbach, state and federal politician (SPD), Geinsheim
- Wilhelm Diehl, Hessian historical researcher and Evangelical Prelate, Kornsand
- Irmgard Schäfer dialectal poet, language researcher and columnist, Geinsheim
- David Wagner ex professional footballer and former head coach of Huddersfield Town
