= Eich (Verbandsgemeinde) =

- Verbandsgemeinde
- Location of Eich within Alzey-Worms district
- Interactive map of Eich
- Location within Germany Location within Rhineland-Palatinate
- Coordinates: 49°45′N 8°24′E
- Country: Germany
- State: Rhineland-Palatinate
- District: Alzey-Worms
- Seat: Eich
- Subdivisions: 5 municipalities

Area
  - Total: 68.48 km^{2} (26.44 sq mi)

Population (2025-12-31)
  - Total: 13,171
  - Density: 192.3/km^{2} (498.1/sq mi)
- Time zone: UTC+01:00 (CET)
  - Summer (DST): UTC+02:00 (CEST)
- Website: www.vg-eich.de

Eich is a Verbandsgemeinde ("collective municipality") in the district Alzey-Worms, Rhineland-Palatinate, Germany. The seat of the Verbandsgemeinde is in Eich.

The Verbandsgemeinde Eich consists of the following Ortsgemeinden ("local municipalities"):

1. Alsheim
2. Eich
3. Gimbsheim
4. Hamm am Rhein
5. Mettenheim

It is mentioned in the Wormser wall-building ordinance from around 900 as one of the places that shared responsibility for maintaining the city wall of Worms.
