= Ludwigshöhe =

- Municipality
- Coat of arms

- Location of Ludwigshöhe within Mainz-Bingen district
- Interactive map of Ludwigshöhe
- Location within Germany Location within Rhineland-Palatinate
- Coordinates: 49°49′00″N 8°20′50″E
- Country: Germany
- State: Rhineland-Palatinate
- District: Mainz-Bingen
- Municipal assoc.: Rhein-Selz

Government
  - Mayor (2019–24): Hartmut Zimmermann

Area
  - Total: 2.99 km^{2} (1.15 sq mi)
- Elevation: 86 m (282 ft)

Population (2025-12-31)
  - Total: 538
  - Density: 180/km^{2} (466/sq mi)
- Time zone: UTC+01:00 (CET)
  - Summer (DST): UTC+02:00 (CEST)
- Postal codes: 55278
- Dialling codes: 06249
- Vehicle registration: MZ
- Website: www.vg-rhein-selz.de

Ludwigshöhe (German pronunciation: [ˈluːtvɪçsˌhøːə]) is an Ortsgemeinde – a municipality belonging to a Verbandsgemeinde, a kind of collective municipality – in the Mainz-Bingen district in Rhineland-Palatinate, Germany. It belongs to the Verbandsgemeinde Rhein-Selz.

== Geography ==
=== Location ===
The small municipality of Ludwigshöhe lies in Rhenish Hesse, in the Rhine rift a short way west of the Rhine on the old Mainz-Worms trade road, nowadays known as Bundesstraße 9, almost exactly halfway between the Rhineland-Palatinate state capital of Mainz and the Nibelungstadt of Worms.

== History ==
Ludwigshöhe is a comparatively new place, but it goes back to the Merovingian community of Rudelsheim. A dykeburst in 1819 brought about a shift in that place’s population to higher ground on a nearby hill.

Rudelsheim had its first documentary mention in 766 in a donation document from the Lorsch Abbey. It is believed to have been founded in the 5th or 6th century by the Franks. After the Romans had already brought winegrowing to the region, this form of agriculture was taken over by the Franks. Above all, it was the monasteries that led grape cultivation and perfected it.

In the Middle Ages, Rudelsheim lay near or right at the yet unchannelled Rhine, whose course could change with each flood, thereby bringing the village considerable misery and damage.

It is mentioned in the Wormser wall-building ordinance from around 900 as one of the places that shared responsibility for maintaining the city wall of Worms.

A devastating dykeburst in December 1819 led to the village being relocated on a hill farther to the west. The foundation stone was laid on 25 August 1822, Saint Louis’s Day, in honour of Louis I, Grand Duke of Hesse, and also in his honour was the new village’s name, Ludwigshöhe (“Ludwig” is the German form of “Louis”; Höhe is German for “heights”). Abandonment and moving from the old Rudelsheim was ongoing up until 1830. The church, the only preserved building, fell victim to a fire in 1837.

== Politics ==
=== Municipal council ===
The council is made up of 8 council members who were elected by majority vote on 13 June 2004.

=== Coat of arms ===
The municipality’s arms might be described thus: Azure a lion rampant barry of nine gules and argent armed and langued gules and crowned Or, in his gambe dexter a sword of the fourth held in bend sinister, in base argent a pot of the first with the inscription ST. VITUS, issuant from beneath which flames of fire of the second.

== Notable people ==
- Johann Becker (1869–1951) German politician (DVP), Member of the Reichstag, Imperial Minister of Economics (see: Weingut Brüder Dr. Becker)
