= Lorsch codex =

12th-century manuscript

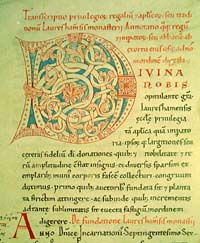
First page of the Lorsch Codex

The Lorsch Codex (Chronicon Laureshamense, Lorscher Codex, Codex Laureshamensis) is an important historical document created between about 1175 to 1195 AD in the Monastery of Saint Nazarius in Lorsch, Germany. The codex is handwritten in Carolingian minuscule, and contains illuminated initials – for example, a huge "D" is presented on the first page. The codex consists of 460 pages in large format which contain more than 3800 entries. It is important because it details the gifts given to the monastery and the possessions belonging to it, giving some of the first mention of cities of the Middle Ages in central Germany, and in particular in the Rhein-Neckar region. Over one thousand places are named. None of the original documents that were copied into the codex are known to have survived.

The codex is now in the Bavarian state archive in Münich.

== Literature ==
- Codex Laureshamensis. Das Urkundenbuch des ehemaligen Reichsklosters Lorch, Neustadt/Aisch 2003 (Bavarian State Archive 1 special publication) ISBN 3-921635-71-3 facsimile edition
- Karl Josef Minst: Lorscher Codex deutsch. Urkundenbuch der ehemaligen Fürstabtei Lorsch, 5 Bde., Lorsch 1966/72 Lorsch (translation)
- Karl Glöckner: Codex Laureshamensis, Darmstadt 1929–1936, reprint 1963 (definitive edition) Online as facsimile at ALO

== See also ==
- History of Germany
- High Middle Ages
- Manuscript
- Annales laureshamenses
