= Eich, Rhineland-Palatinate =

Eich
- Municipality
- Coat of arms

- Location of Eich within Alzey-Worms district
- Interactive map of Eich
- Location within Germany Location within Rhineland-Palatinate
- Coordinates: 49°45′00″N 08°23′56″E
- Country: Germany
- State: Rhineland-Palatinate
- District: Alzey-Worms
- Municipal assoc.: Eich

Government
  - Mayor (2019–24): Klaus Willius (SPD)

Area
  - Total: 21.02 km^{2} (8.12 sq mi)
- Elevation: 87 m (285 ft)

Population (2025-12-31)
  - Total: 3,886
  - Density: 184.9/km^{2} (478.8/sq mi)
- Time zone: UTC+01:00 (CET)
  - Summer (DST): UTC+02:00 (CEST)
- Postal codes: 67575
- Dialling codes: 06246
- Vehicle registration: AZ
- Website: www.ortsgemeinde-eich.de

Eich (German pronunciation: [aɪç]) is an Ortsgemeinde – a municipality belonging to a Verbandsgemeinde, a kind of collective municipality – in the Alzey-Worms district in Rhineland-Palatinate, Germany.

== Geography ==
=== Location ===
The municipality lies in Rhenish Hesse, and is the seat of the Verbandsgemeinde of Eich. It lies roughly 15 km north of Worms, and 25 km southwest of Darmstadt.

== History ==
In 782, Eich had its first documentary mention. It has developed itself from a fishing village to a municipality based on agriculture that also serves as a residential community for workers in nearby cities and towns.

== Politics ==
=== Municipal council ===
The council is made up of 20 council members who were elected at the municipal election held on 7 June 2009, and the honorary mayor as chairman.

The municipal election held on 7 June 2009 yielded the following results:

	CDU	SPD	FWG	GLA	FDP	Total
1999	5	11	2	1	1	20 seats
2004	5	11	2	1	1	20 seats
2009	4	11	1	1	3	20 seats

=== Mayors ===
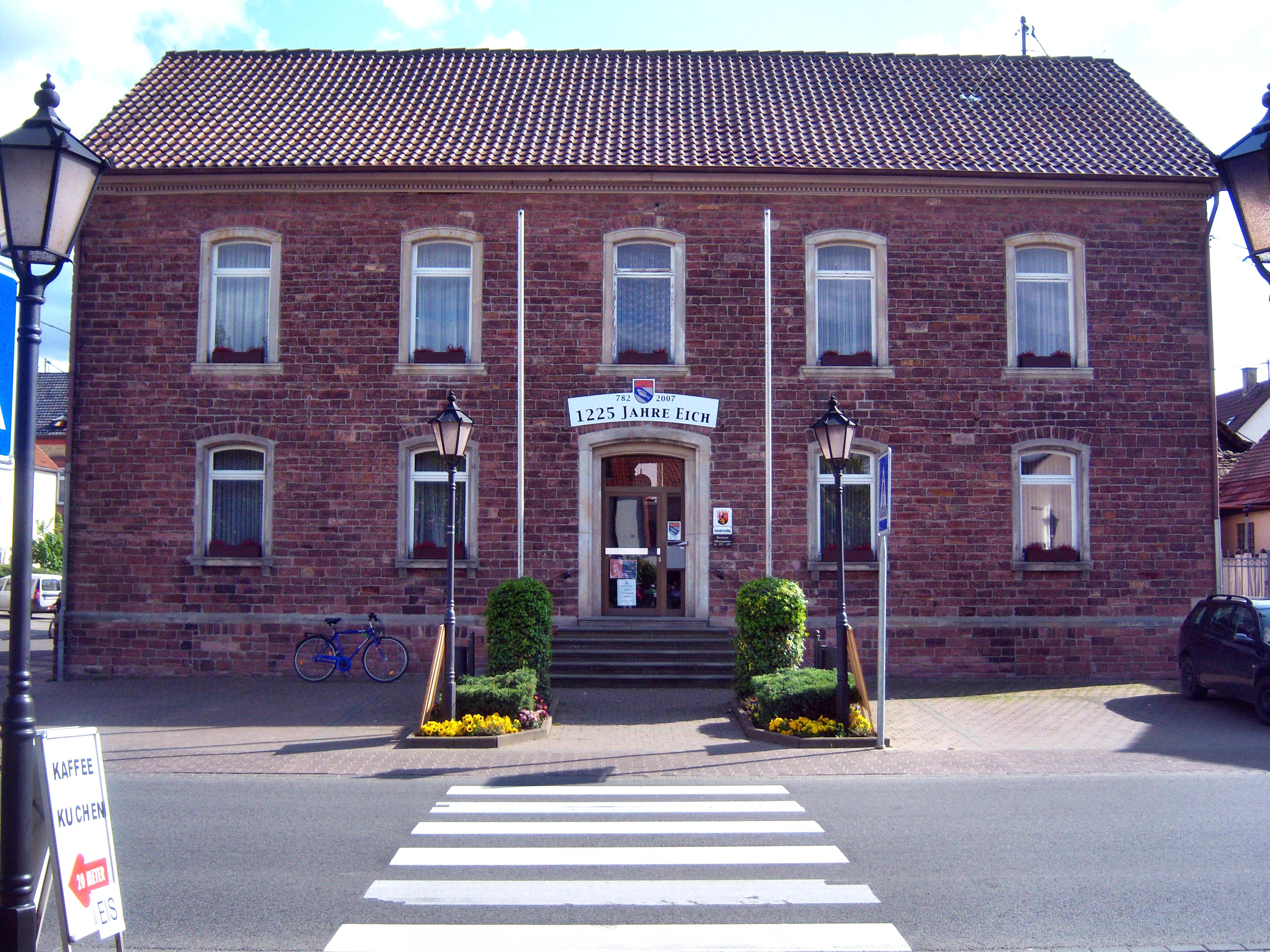
Eich's municipal administration

- 1946-1966 Rudolf Becker (SPD)
- 1966-1979 Hans Ludwig Menger (FWG), Bearer of the Ring of Honour of the Municipality of Eich
- 1979-1994 Günter Reich (SPD)
- 1994–present Klaus Willius (SPD)

Klaus Willius was reëlected on 7 June 2009 with 75.05% of the valid votes, beating the CDU candidate Christine Müller.

=== Coat of arms ===
The municipality's arms might be described thus: Argent a bend azure surmounted by a fish of the field, in a chief gules an acorn palewise and two oakleaves, one bendwise, the other bendwise sinister, conjoined on one stem Or.

The fish refers to the village's history as a fishing settlement. The blue bend (diagonal stripe) stands for the Rhine. The acorn is a canting charge, referring to the municipality's name (“acorn” is Eichel, and “oak” is Eiche in German).

== Culture and sightseeing ==
=== Church ===
The Evangelical parish church came into being in 1839 under Grand-Ducal Hessian provincial master builder from Mainz Ignaz Opfermann's (1799–1866) building plans.

=== Music ===
Besides the Evangelical church choir, there are also the men's singing club, Sängerbund, and Saint Michael's Choir (St. Michaelischor). Furthermore, there is the Goldklang mandolin club.

=== Buildings ===
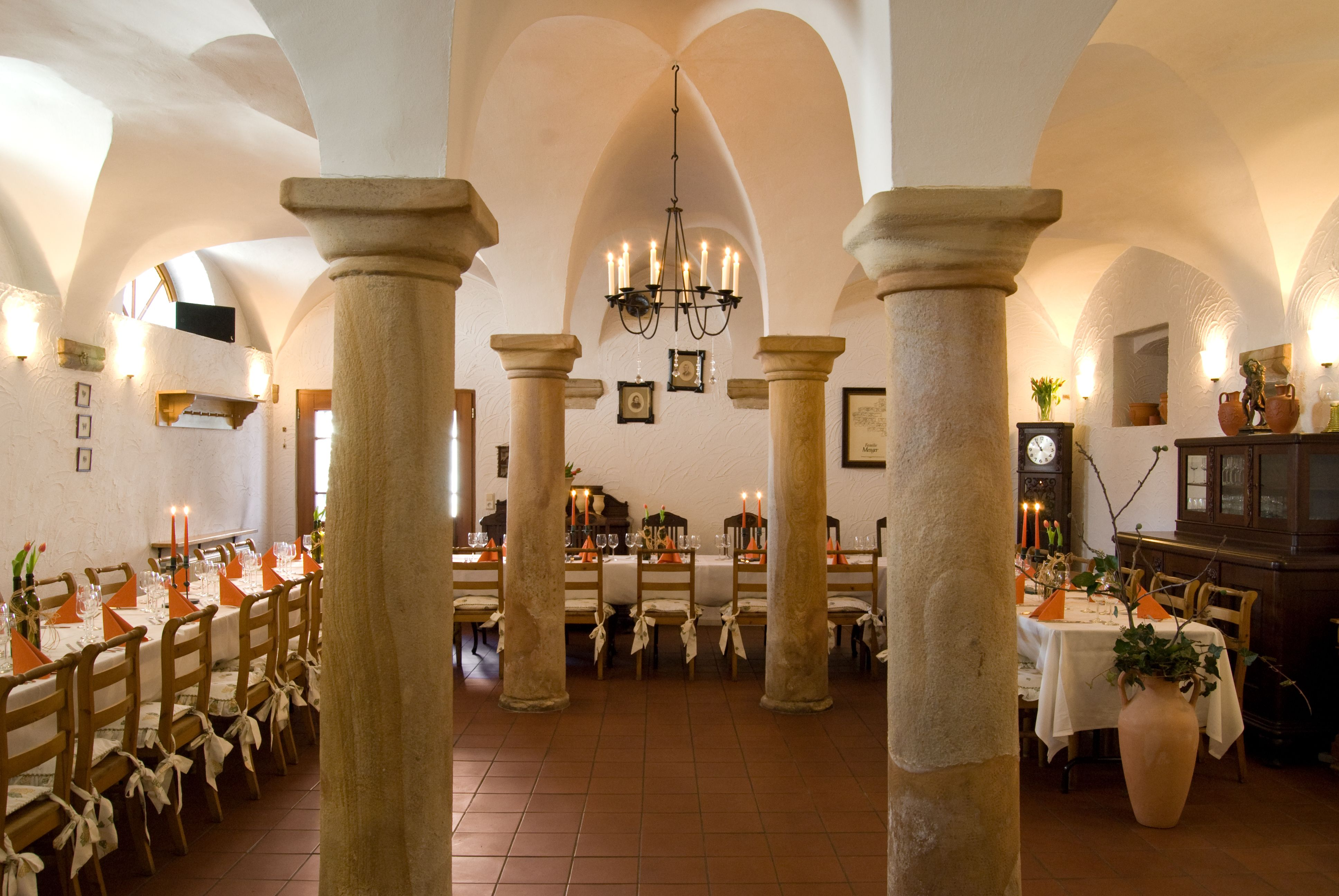
Built as a cowshed in 1824, and now used as a wine tasting parlour

In the village heart is found a stone, vaulted cowshed. However, nowadays this historic groin-vaulted space is used as a winery's wine-tasting parlour.

=== Sport ===
With the Altrheinhalle (“Old Rhine Hall”), Eich has had at hand since 1974 a sport facility with 6,000 seats that is also used for concerts and television programmes. In the field around the hall are competition sites for track and field athletics and a tennis court (since 1977). On the Eicher See (lake) are a sailing club and two boules courts. On the Altrheinsee (another lake), a bathing beach has been set up. Furthermore, there are also the Turnverein von 1888 Eich (gymnastic club), FC Germania 07 Eich, the Tennisclub Blau-Weiß and two angling clubs, AC Rheinlust 1954 Eich and ASV Eich.

=== Regular events ===
Each year on the second Saturday after Easter, the so-called Motorradsegnung (“Motorcycle Blessing”) is held in Eich. This is attended by more than 15,000 motorcyclists from all over Germany who have themselves and their motorcycles blessed to take part in an excursion through the whole region. In 2006 the blessing was carried out by Karl Cardinal Lehmann, the Catholic Bishop of Mainz.

The three-day Altrheinfest (“Old Rhine Festival”) is staged each year by the volunteer fire brigade on the last weekend in June.

== Economy and infrastructure ==
The village's economic mainstay is still farming, but sand quarrying and petroleum recovery have grown into important branches of industry.

=== Education ===
Since the 1998/1999 schoolyear, Eich has had at its disposal a “regional school” (Regionale Schule, a school type found in some parts of Germany that combines the Hauptschule and Realschule concepts, but not the Gymnasium concept).
