= Bensheim-Auerbach station =

Railway station in Bensheim-Auerbach, Germany

Bensheim Auerbach
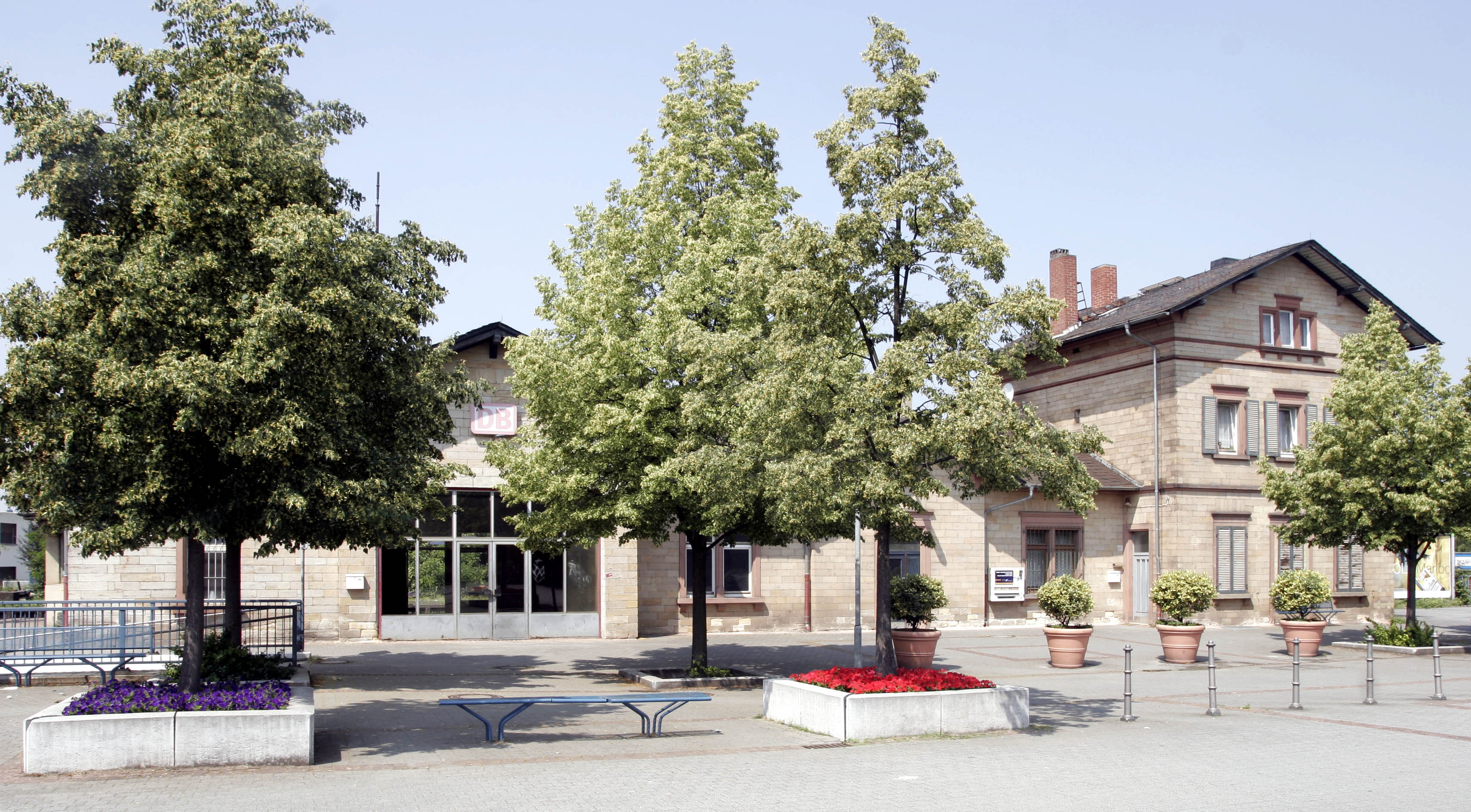

General information
- Location: Otto-Beck-Str. 32, Bensheim, Hesse; Germany
- Coordinates: 49°42′7″N 8°36′48″E
- Line: Main-Neckar Railway (47.2 km) (KBS 650)
- Platforms: 3

Construction
- Accessible: Yes
- Architect: Georg Moller

Other information
- Station code: 489
- DS100 code: FBAU
- IBNR: 8000877
- Category: 5
- Fare zone: VRN: 35; : 4510 (VRN transitional tariff)
- Website: www.bahnhof.de

History
- Opened: 1850

Services
Preceding station	DB Regio Mitte	Following station
Zwingenberg (Bergstraße) towards Frankfurt (Main) Hbf	RB 67	Bensheim towards Mannheim Hbf or Hockenheim
Zwingenberg (Bergstraße) towards Frankfurt (Main) Hbf	RB 68	Bensheim towards Wiesloch-Walldorf
Location

Bensheim-Auerbach station is a station on the Main-Neckar Railway in the Bensheim district of Auerbach on the Mountain Road in the German state of Hesse. It has a heritage-listed entrance building. The station is classified by Deutsche Bahn (DB) as a category 5 station. Only Regionalbahn services stop at the 3 platform tracks (only tracks 1 and 2 are used regularly).

== History ==
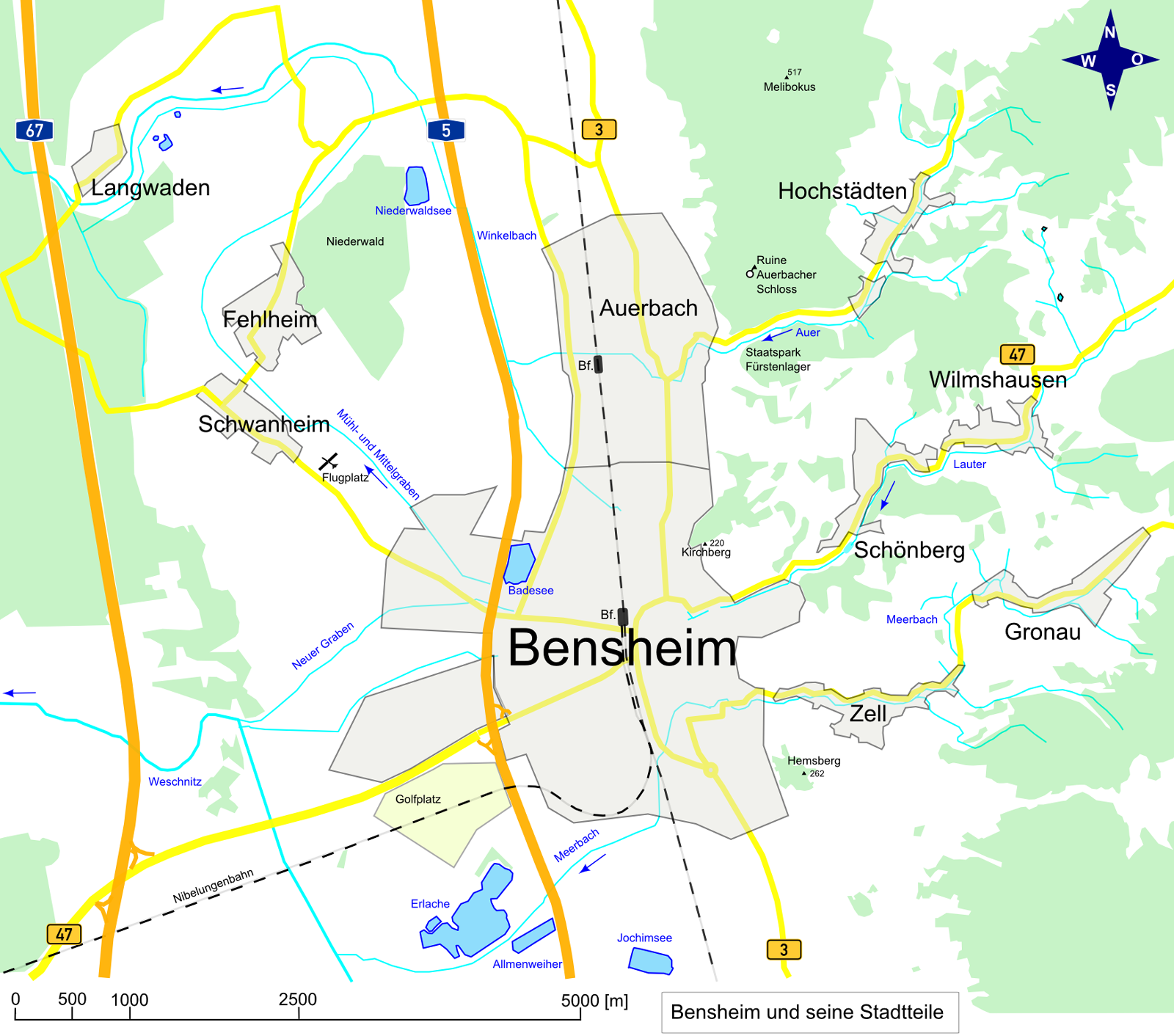
The location of the station in the Bensheim district of Auerbach

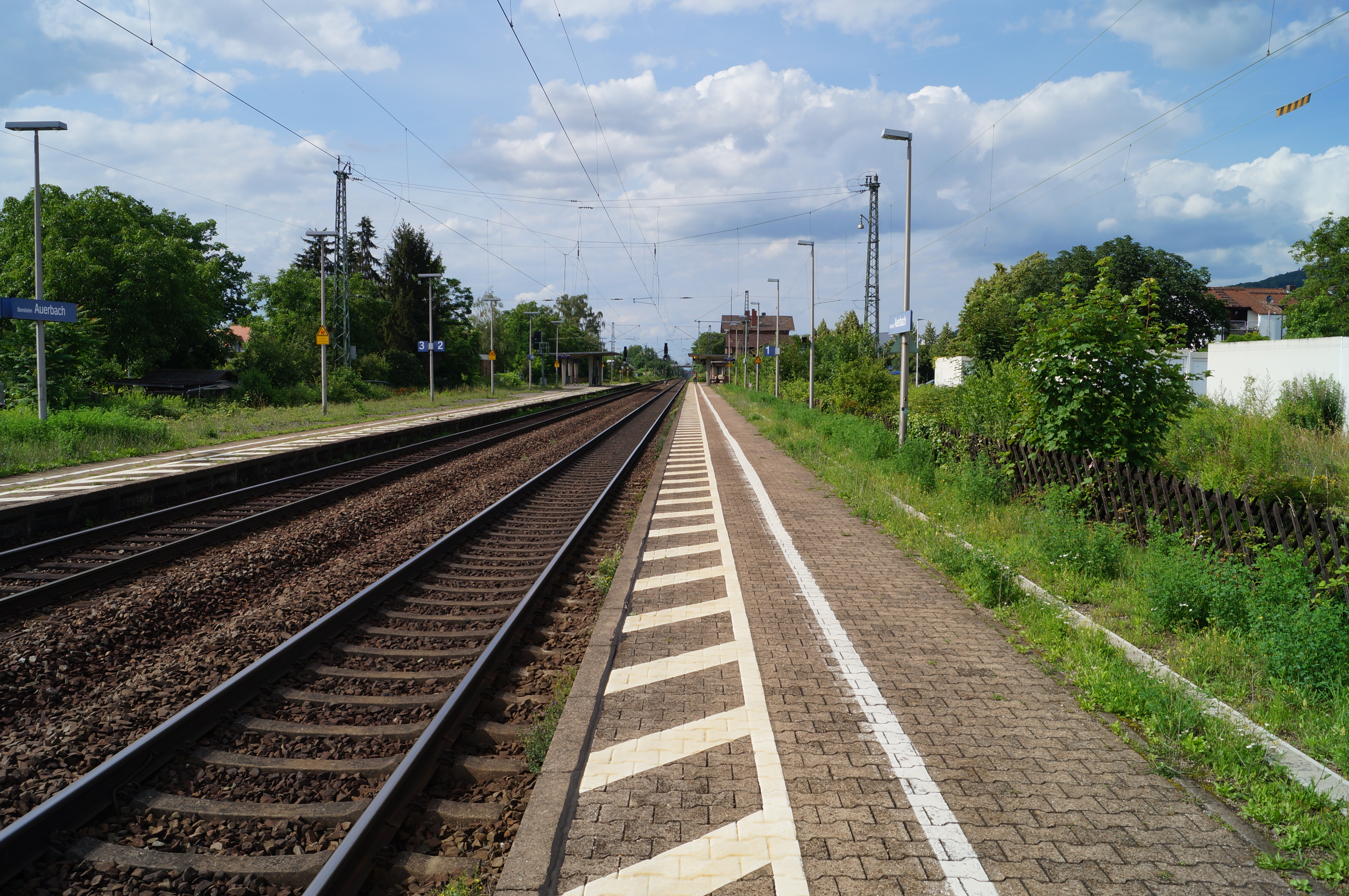
The platforms of Bensheim-Auerbach station

The station was opened in 1850 along on the Main-Neckar Railway, which was opened in 1846 between Frankfurt and Heidelberg.

The plans for the entrance building were probably drawn up by the Darmstadt court architect Georg Moller. The station is a two-storey building, originally containing railway residential and administrative spaces. It features a gable roof covered with a low pitched roof. Beneath the eaves there are small mezzanine windows. The station has three lines of windows built of yellow sandstone. The southern gable is clad in timber. On the trackside toward the roof there are cast iron columns, which were probably made in 1846. On the southwest side a small signal box house was built in 1920. There is architectural evidence that it was designed by Heinrich Metzendorf.

== Infrastructure ==
The station is classified as a category 5 station.

In December 2007, DB announced that it intended to sell the station building and shortly later that it had sold it to an investor.

The station is an increasingly important transport hub for the region and it is included in the overall concept for Hessentag 2014, which is being celebrated in Bensheim. There are also proposals to include it on a new line of the Rhine-Neckar S-Bahn. Work has therefore carried out from April 2012 to fully rehabilitate it.

== Operations ==
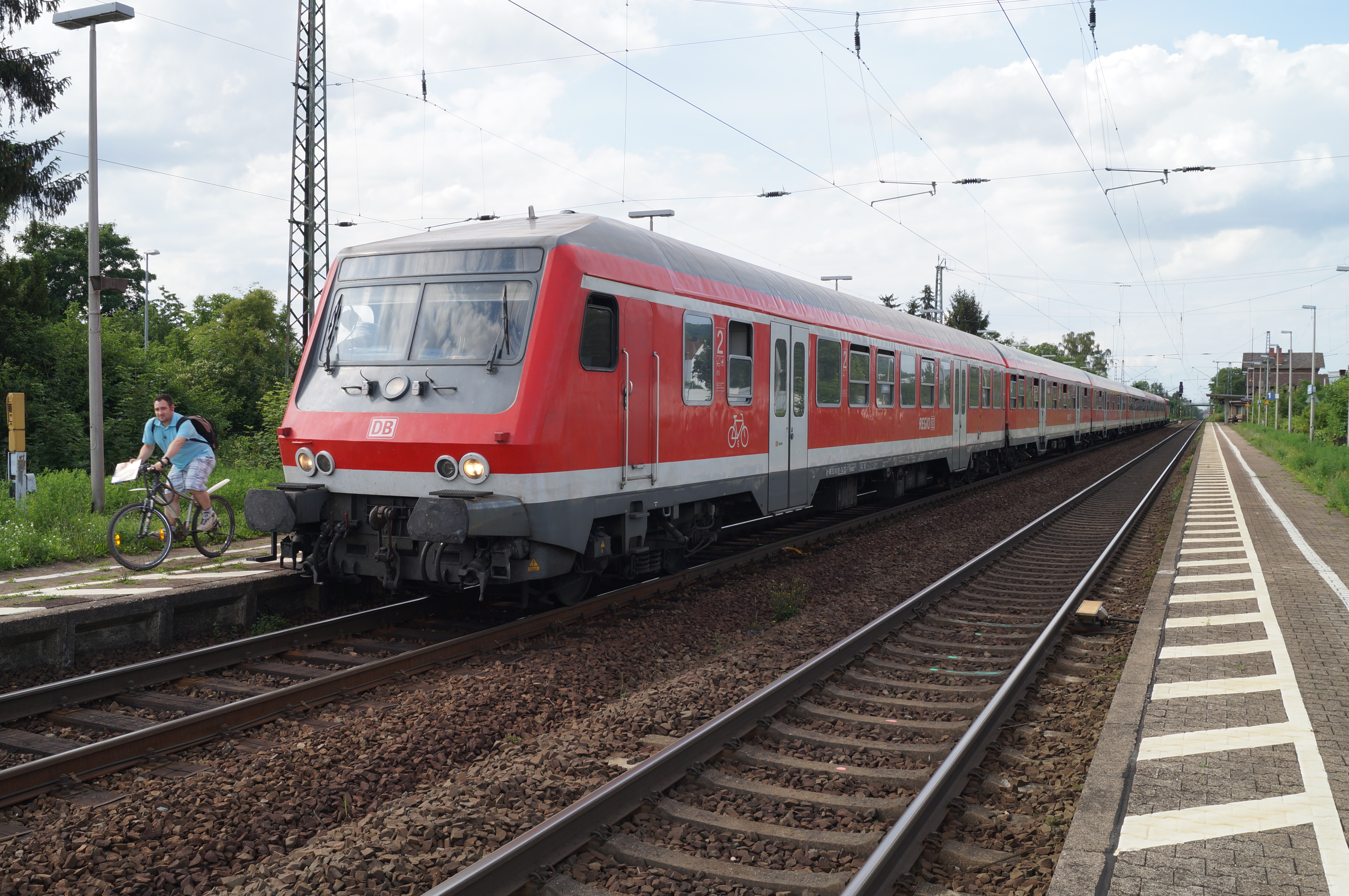
Regionalbahn service in Bensheim-Auerbacher station on its way to Heidelberg Hauptbahnhof

The trains is served by the RB 67 Regionalbahn (stopping) on the Neu-Edingen/Friedrichsfeld – Weinheim (Bergstr) – Bensheim-Auerbach – Bensheim – Darmstadt Hbf – Frankfurt (Main) Hbf route and the RB 68 service on the Heidelberg Hbf – Weinheim – Bensheim-Auerbach – Bensheim – Darmstadt Hbf – Frankfurt (Main) Hbf route, both hourly.
