= Bickenbach (Bergstr) station =

Railway station in Bickenbach, Germany

Bickenbach (Bergstr)
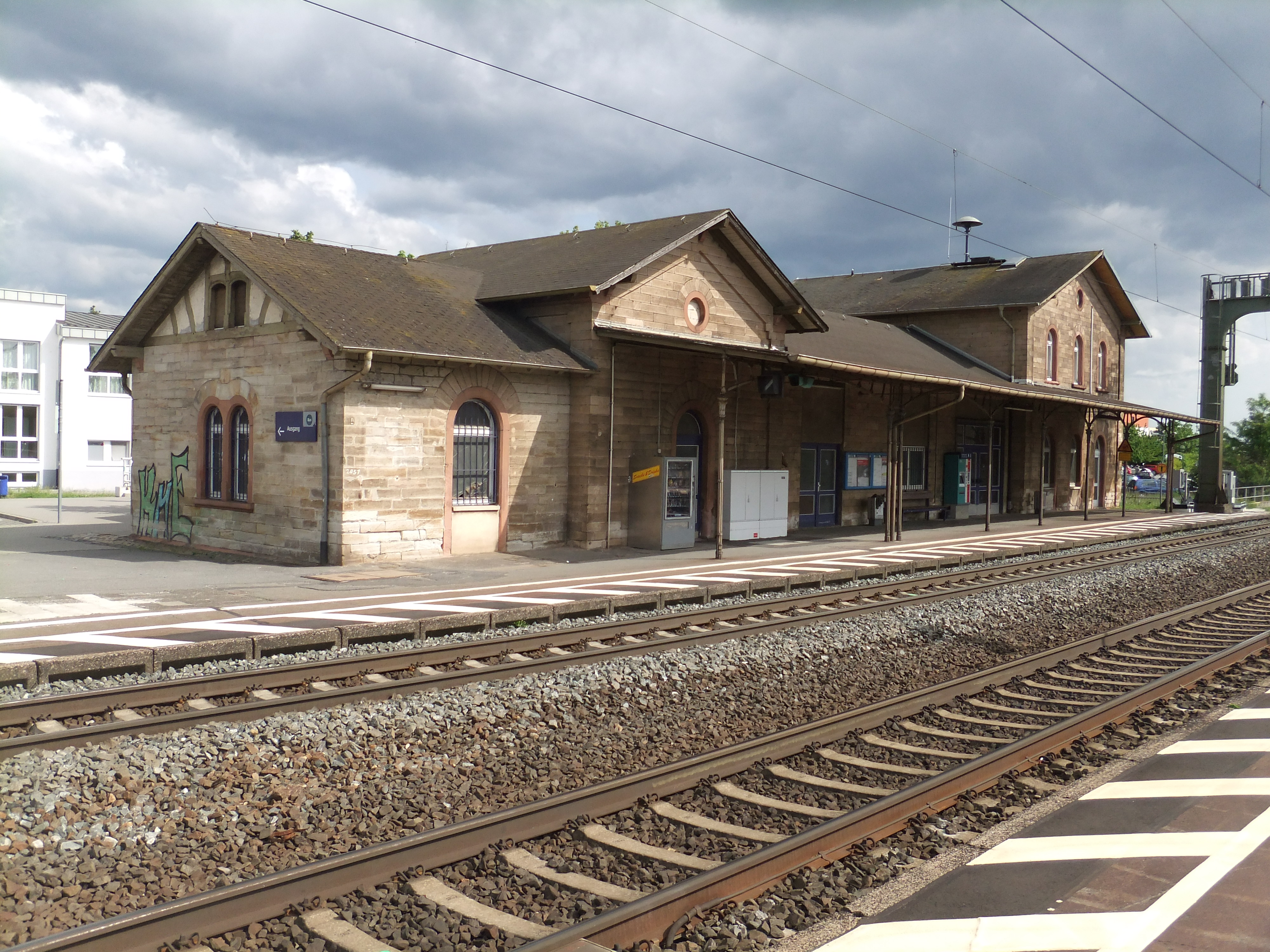

General information
- Location: Bahnhofstr. 77, Bickenbach, Hesse; Germany
- Coordinates: 49°45′35″N 8°36′12″E
- Lines: Main-Neckar railway (40.7 km); Bickenbach–Seeheim (0.0 km)
- Platforms: 3

Construction
- Accessible: Yes

Other information
- Station code: 618
- DS100 code: FBI
- IBNR: 8000948
- Category: 5
- Fare zone: : 3901
- Website: www.bahnhof.de

History
- Opened: 1848

Services
Preceding station	DB Regio Mitte	Following station
Darmstadt Hbf towards Frankfurt (Main) Hbf	RE 60	Bensheim towards Mannheim Hbf
Darmstadt-Eberstadt towards Frankfurt (Main) Hbf	RB 68	Hähnlein-Alsbach towards Wiesloch-Walldorf
Location

Bickenbach (Bergstr) station is the only station in the municipality of Bickenbach in the German state of Hesse on the Main-Neckar Railway between Frankfurt and Heidelberg.The station is classified by Deutsche Bahn as a category 5 station.

== History ==
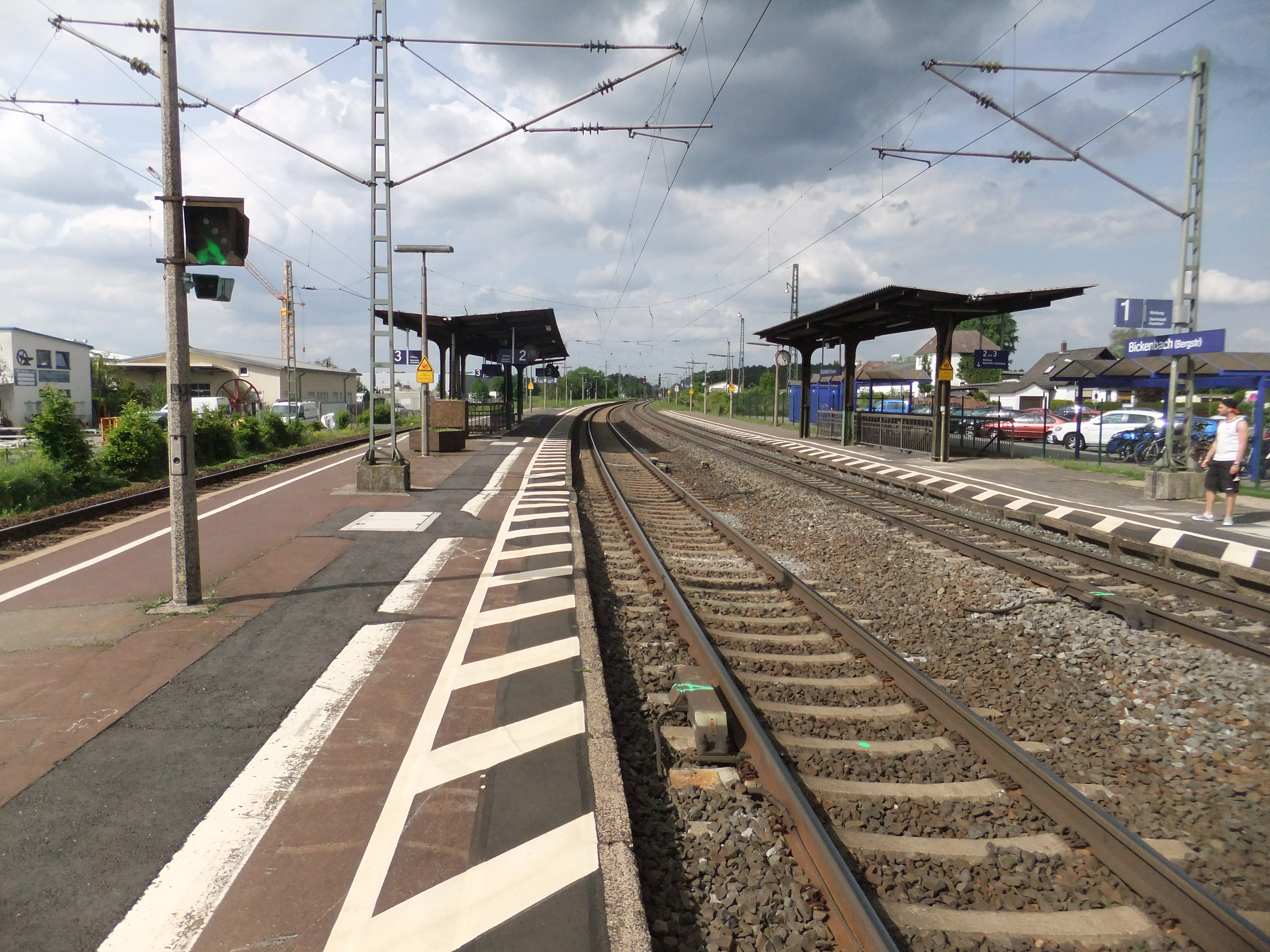
Platforms

The station was opened in 1848 on the Main-Neckar Railway, which connects Frankfurt and Heidelberg. Initially, only a few stations were planned, but between 1848 and 1888 other stations were opened, including in Bickenbach and Erzhausen. The station building was designed by the Darmstadt city architect Georg Moller.

In December 1894, construction began on a branch line from Bickenbach to the neighbouring community of Seeheim-Jugenheim. The Bickenbach–Seeheim line was opened on 6 July 1895.

During the Second World War, the station was repeatedly the target of air raids.

On 31 December 1955, passenger traffic on the Bickenbach–Seeheim line was discontinued. Freight traffic was abandoned in July 1960. The line was dismantled in March 1961.

== Infrastructure ==
Bickenbach station is classified as a category 5 station. Approximately 50 trains stop here each day (Regional-Express and Regionalbahn). The station has been made accessible for the disabled. It has three platform tracks at a “home” platform (next to the station building). In the station forecourt there is a park and ride car park. There are interchanges with buses.

== Rail services ==
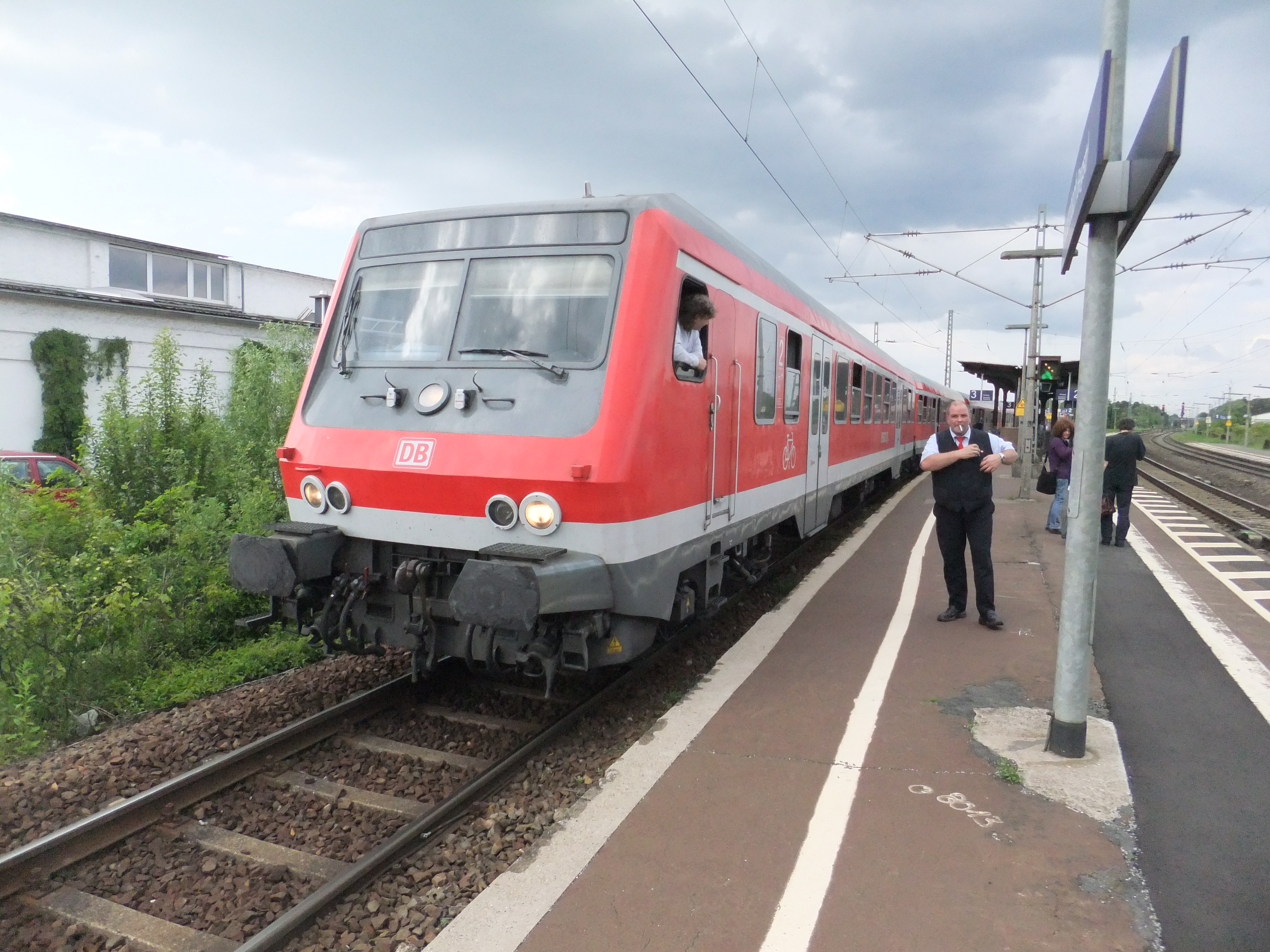
Regionalbahn service on the Main-Neckar Railway in Bickenbacher station running from Frankfurt to Heidelberg

57 regional services operated by Deutsche Bahn stop in Bickenbach (Bergstraße) each day.

Line	Route	Frequency
RE 60	Frankfurt (Main) – Darmstadt – Bickenbach (Bergstr) – Bensheim – Weinheim (Bergstr) – Mannheim	Every 120 minutes (Mon-Fri)
RB 68	Frankfurt (Main) – Darmstadt – Bickenbach (Bergstr) – Bensheim – Weinheim (Bergstr) – Neu-Edingen/Mannheim-Friedrichsfeld – Heidelberg	Every 60 minutes
