= Ladenburg station =

Railway station in Germany

Ladenburg
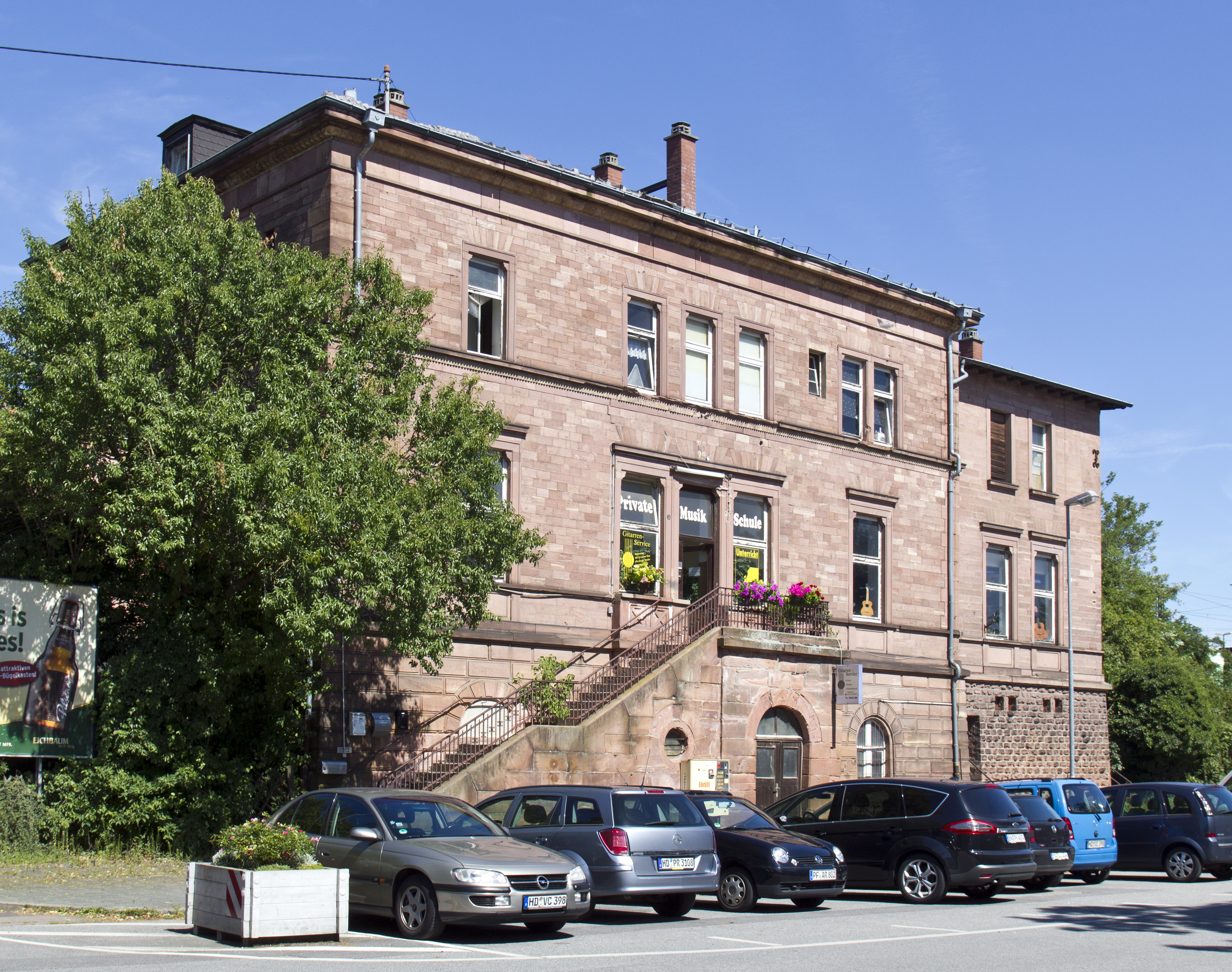
- 2013

General information
- Location: Am Bahnhof 5; 68526 Ladenburg; Baden-Württemberg; Germany
- Coordinates: 49.4741°N 8.6028°E
- System: Bf
- Owner: Deutsche Bahn
- Operator: DB Station&Service
- Lines: Main-Neckar Railway (KBS 650)
- Platforms: 1 island platform 1 side platform
- Tracks: 3
- Train operators: DB Regio Mitte; S-Bahn RheinNeckar
- Connections: RE 60; RB 67 RB 68; S6

Construction
- Parking: yes
- Cycle facilities: yes
- Accessible: yes

Other information
- Station code: 3490
- DS100 code: RLD
- IBNR: 8003489
- Category: 4
- Fare zone: VRN: 95
- Website: www.bahnhof.de

History
- Opened: 1 August 1846; 180 years ago

Services
Preceding station	DB Regio Mitte	Following station
Weinheim (Bergstr) towards Frankfurt (Main) Hbf	RE 60	Mannheim Hbf Terminus
Heddesheim/Hirschberg towards Frankfurt (Main) Hbf	RB 67	Neu-Edingen/Friedrichsfeld towards Mannheim Hbf or Hockenheim
Heddesheim/Hirschberg towards Frankfurt (Main) Hbf	RB 68	Neu-Edingen/Friedrichsfeld towards Wiesloch-Walldorf
Preceding station	Rhine-Neckar S-Bahn	Following station
Neu-Edingen/Friedrichsfeld towards Mainz Hbf	S6	Heddesheim/Hirschberg towards Bensheim
Location
- Location within Baden-Württemberg Location within Germany Location within Europe

Ladenburg station is a railway station in the municipality of Ladenburg, located in Baden-Württemberg, Germany.
