= Neu-Edingen/Mannheim-Friedrichsfeld station =

Separation station in Germany

Neu-Edingen Mannheim Friedrichsfeld
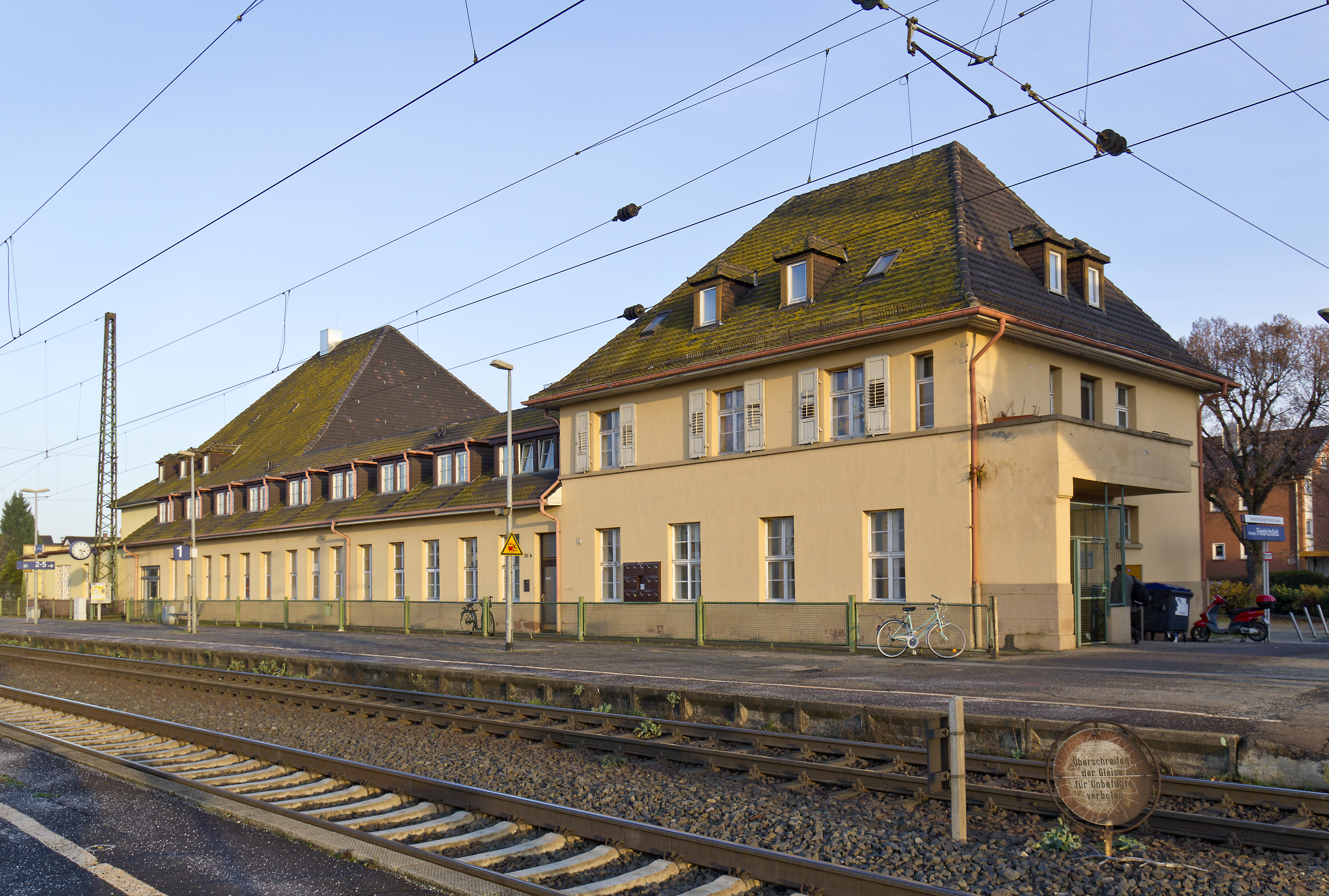

General information
- Location: Edingen-Neckarhausen, Baden-Württemberg; Germany
- Coordinates: 49°26′55″N 8°34′49″E
- Lines: Main-Neckar Railway (77.1 km); connecting curve to the Rhine Valley Railway
- Platforms: 5 (formerly 7)

Construction
- Accessible: Yes

Other information
- Station code: 3927
- DS100 code: RMF
- IBNR: 8000631
- Category: 4
- Fare zone: VRN: 104 and 115
- Website: www.bahnhof.de

History
- Opened: 1 August 1846; 180 years ago

Passengers
- ca. 20,000 daily

Services
Preceding station	DB Regio Mitte	Following station
Ladenburg towards Frankfurt (Main) Hbf	RE 60	Mannheim ARENA/Maimarkt towards Mannheim Hbf
Ladenburg towards Frankfurt (Main) Hbf	RB 67	Mannheim Hbf Terminus
Ladenburg towards Frankfurt (Main) Hbf	RB 67	Schwetzingen towards Hockenheim
Ladenburg towards Frankfurt (Main) Hbf	RB 68	Heidelberg-Pfaffengrund/Wieblingen towards Wiesloch-Walldorf
Preceding station	Rhine-Neckar S-Bahn	Following station
Mannheim-Seckenheim towards Mainz Hbf	S6	Ladenburg towards Bensheim
Location

Neu-Edingen/Mannheim-Friedrichsfeld station (formerly Mannheim-Friedrichsfeld) is a separation station in the Mannheim district of Friedrichsfeld on the border with the municipality of Edingen-Neckarhausen in the German state of Baden-Württemberg. All rail tracks are in Mannheim, only the station building is located on the territory of the Edingen-Neckarhausen hamlet of Neu-Enghien. It is classified by Deutsche Bahn as a category 4 station. It has been served by the Rhine-Neckar S-Bahn since December 2018.

== History ==
In 1838 the Main-Neckar Railway was planned to connect Frankfurt to Mannheim and Heidelberg. The Bensheim–Heidelberg section was opened together with the branch from Mannheim and thus the whole length of the Main-Neckar Railway was completed on 1 August 1846 in Friedrichsfeld. In order for both cities to be treated equally, a break-of-gauge station had to be built by the Main-Neckar Railway and the Grand Duchy of Baden State Railway.

On 1 June 1880 the line from Mannheim-Friedrichsfeld to Schwetzingen was put into operation, which is almost exclusively used by freight traffic. In preparation for it, the station was substantially rebuilt in 1879/80. Electric lighting was installed in Friedrichsfeld station in 1896. In 2016, Mannheim-Friedrichsfeld station was renamed Neu-Edingen/Mannheim-Friedrichsfeld.

== Platforms ==
Friedrichsfeld station has an extensive system of tracks. Five of the seven platform tracks that were previously available for passenger services are still in use at the “home” platform and two island platforms.

The numbering begins on the east side of the station building.

- Track 1 is a through track and is the “home” platform in front of the station building. Today, it is used for Regionalbahn services on the Mannheim Hbf–Bensheim route (RB 60).
- Track 2 shares an island platform with track 3. Today, it is used by Stadt-Express services towards Frankfurt Hbf via Weinheim, Heppenheim, Bensheim, Bickenbach and Darmstadt Hbf (SE 60).
- Track 3 is a through track and is located on the platform next to track 2. The track is currently not being used for scheduled passenger services.
- Track 4 is a through track and is on the second island platform. Today, it is used for services towards Heidelberg Hbf or Mannheim Hbf (RE/SE 60).
- Track 5 is another through track and is located on the second island platform next to track 4. It is served by Regionalbahn services from Bensheim to Mannheim and Regionalbahn services beginning in Friedrichsfeld running to Mainz Hbf via Ludwigshafen, Frankenthal and Worms.
- Tracks 6 to 14 are not used for passenger services; tracks 6 to 9 are used for through freight trains and tracks 10 to 14 are sidings.

The former island platform between tracks 6 and 7 has been largely removed.

The platforms of the Mannheim-Friedrichsfeld station are not barrier-free for the disabled. To get to the platforms of tracks 2 to 5, it is necessary to use an underpass from platform 1. A door of the entrance building leads to a staircase leading to the pedestrian underpass to the platforms.

== Rail services ==
Mannheim-Friedrichsfeld station belongs to the fare zone of the Verkehrsverbund Rhein-Neckar (Rhine-Neckar Transport Association, VRN). The first continuous test run from Frankfurt to Heidelberg took place on 27 July 1846.

Mannheim-Friedrichsfeld station is now (2013) used by Regionalbahn trains from Mannheim towards Bensheim in preparation for the future operations of the Rhine-Neckar S-Bahn as well as Regionalbahn services (designated as Stadt-Express services) from Heidelberg to Frankfurt am Main. The station is also the starting point of Regionalbahn services via Mannheim to Mainz, which in the weekday peak hour occasionally begin or end in Bensheim. From Monday to Friday, in the morning a Regional-Express service from Frankfurt to Mannheim stops at the station and in the evening a Regional-Express service from Frankfurt to Heidelberg stops at the station.

Line	Route	Frequency
RE 60	Frankfurt – Darmstadt – Bensheim – Weinheim – Neu-Edingen/Mannheim-Friedrichsfeld – Mannheim	Individual services
RB 67	Frankfurt – Darmstadt – Bensheim – Weinheim – Neu-Edingen/Mannheim-Friedrichsfeld – Heidelberg Hbf (coupled with RB67 from Frankfurt to Neu-Edingen/Mannheim-Friedrichsfeld)	60 mins
RB 68	Frankfurt – Darmstadt – Bickenbach – Bensheim – Heppenheim – Weinheim – Neu-Edingen/Mannheim-Friedrichsfeld – Heidelberg (– Wiesloch-Walldorf) (coupled with RB68 from Frankfurt to Neu-Edingen/Mannheim-Friedrichsfeld)	60 mins
S6	Bensheim – Heppenheim – Weinheim – Neu-Edingen/Mannheim-Friedrichsfeld – Mannheim – Ludwigshafen – Worms – Mainz	Every 60 minutes
