= Schwetzingen station =

Through station in Schwetzingen, Baden-Württemberg, Germany

Schwetzingen
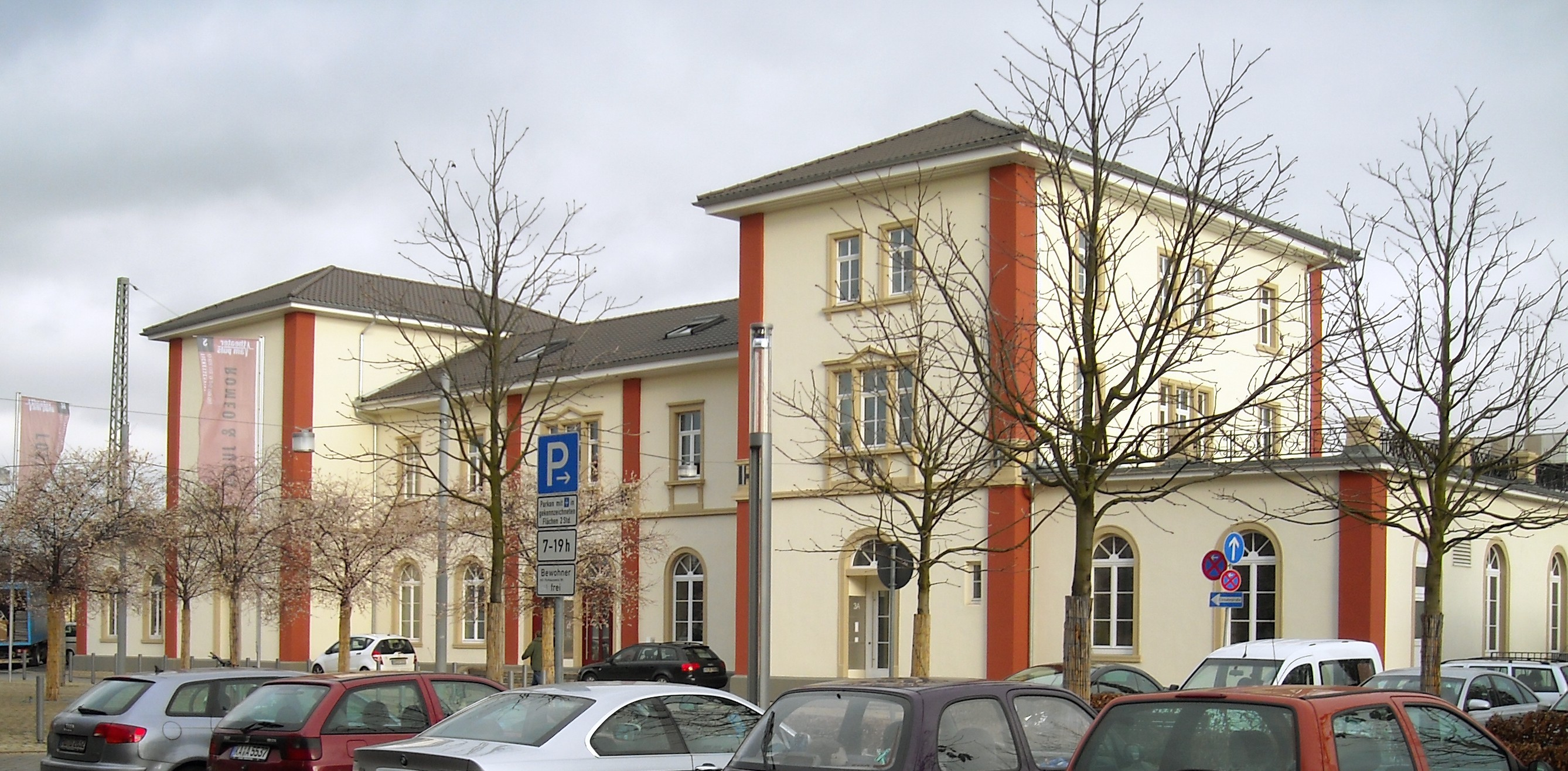
- Schwetzingen station in December 2008

General information
- Location: Bahnhofsanlage 1–3, Schwetzingen, Baden-Württemberg; Germany
- Coordinates: 49°23′00″N 8°34′43″E
- Lines: Mannheim–Karlsruhe (km 13.6); Mannheim-Friedrichsfeld–Schwetzingen (now only freight); Heidelberg–Speyer (km 9.4) (now only freight)
- Platforms: 2
- Tracks: 3

Construction
- Accessible: Yes

Other information
- Station code: 5766
- DS100 code: RSZ
- IBNR: 8005494
- Category: 4
- Fare zone: VRN: 124
- Website: www.bahnhof.de

History
- Opened: 4 August 1870

Services
Preceding station	DB Regio Mitte	Following station
Neu-Edingen/Mannheim-Friedrichsfeld towards Frankfurt (Main) Hbf	RB 67	Oftersheim towards Hockenheim
Preceding station	Rhine-Neckar S-Bahn	Following station
Oftersheim towards Karlsruhe Hbf	S9	Schwetzingen-Hirschacker towards Groß‑Rohrheim
Location

Schwetzingen station is a through station in Schwetzingen, a town in the German state of Baden-Württemberg and lies not far from its centre. It is located at kilometre 13.6 of the Rhine Railway, which runs from Mannheim via Hockenheim and Graben-Neudorf to Karlsruhe. North of the station, the line to Mannheim-Friedrichsfeld branches to connect with the Main-Neckar Railway; the branch is almost exclusively used by freight. Until 1967, the Heidelberg–Speyer railway gave Schwetzingen direct connections to Heidelberg and Speyer. The only operating section of this line today is the section from Schwetzingen to the industrial area of Hockenheim-Talhaus, which is used for freight traffic.

It is classified by Deutsche Bahn (DB) as a category 4 station. It has three platform tracks and is served exclusively by DB services. Its address is Bahnhofsanlage 1–3.

== History ==
Schwetzingen station was opened with the Rhine Railway on the Mannheim–Schwetzingen–Hockenheim–Waghäusel–Graben-Neudorf–Eggenstein–Karlsruhe route on 4 August 1870. The line and the station building formed part of the Grand Duchy of Baden State Railway (Großherzoglich Badische Staatseisenbahnen).

In accordance with a law enacted by Baden on 2 February 1870 and a concession issued on 3 April 1872 under the Bavarian-Baden Treaty of 23 November 1871, the Heidelberg–Eppelheim–Plankstadt–Schwetzingen section of the Heidelberg–Speyer railway was opened on 17 July 1873. It was extended to Speyer on 10 December 1873 over a pontoon bridge that had been established for road traffic in 1865. The builder and, until its nationalisation on 1 July 1894, the owner of this line was the Heidelberg Speyer Railway Company (Heidelberg-Speyer-Eisenbahn-Gesellschaft), but it was operated, along with the Rhine Railway, by the Grand Duchy of Baden State Railway. With the opening of this line, Schwetzingen station became a small railway junction.

The Mannheim-Friedrichsfeld–Schwetzingen railway, which branches from the Rhine Railway to the north of the station, was opened on 1 June 1880.

The Schwetzingen–Ketsch tramway was opened by the Rheinische Schuckert-Gesellschaft on 12 December 1910. An overland tramway was opened in 1927 to Schwetzingen of the Schwetzingen–Plankstadt–Eppelheim–Heidelberg route by the Heidelberger Straßen- und Bergbahn AG (Heidelberg Street and Mountain Railway, HSB). Because of a sharp drop in passenger numbers, the line was closed on 31 March 1938.

The Heidelberg–Schwetzingen–Speyer railway was bombed on 13 October 1941 during the Second World War, but not so badly damaged that it was untraffickable. The fixed bridge that had replaced the pontoon bridge in Speyer in 1938 was blown up by retreating German troops in 1945. As a result, the Oftersheim–Speyer section was closed. Only a short branch line from Schwetzingen station to the industrial area of Hockenheim-Talhaus remained open for freight.

The Rhine railway was electrified in the 1950s.

The Heidelberg–Eppelheim–Plankstadt–Schwetzingen tramway, which was operated by HSB from 1927 to 1974, ran right through the villages, which was convenient for passengers, and provided strong competition to the Heidelberg–Schwetzingen–Speyer railway. Due to low demand the remaining part of the railway was closed for passengers and freight on 1 February 1967. A few years later, however, the Heidelberg–Schwetzingen tramway was closed because of the poor financial situation of the HSB.

== Entrance building ==
The stately entrance building of Schwetzingen station now houses a DB travel centre, a newsagent and several offices. The station building was bought and refurbished by the iib company in 2007.

== Platforms ==
Schwetzingen station has three platform tracks with a side platform next to the station building and an island platform with two faces. While platforms 1 and 2 are used by trains on the Rhine Railway, platforms 5 and 55 are used by trains to and from Neu-Edingen/Friedrichsfeld and for overtaking slower trains or unscheduled stops. The island platform between tracks 2 and 55 can only be reached through the 6.0 m wide pedestrian underpass at km 13.515, which begins at the entrance building. It is video-monitored by a camera system from the town of Schwetzingen, the connection box of which is located in the entrance building below the platform roof. The southern staircases of the underpass were replaced by passenger lifts during the modernisation of the station in 2017 in order to make the island platform fully accessible.

On both platforms, the renewed part to the south is connected to the old part, which is 38 cm high, by an approximately 5 m-long ramp with a gradient of 2.2% and has only been shortened by 84 m at the middle platform, so that each has a total length of 300 m was preserved. This allows intercity trains to stop during diversions. The approximately 150 m-long platform canopy of the central platform is heritage-listed.

Next to platform track 55, there are 7 sets of tracks, which are occasionally used as sidings for freight trains.

Platforms
Platform	Usable length	Platform height	Current use
1	210 m	76 cm	Services towards Hockenheim/Karlsruhe
2	210 m	76 cm	Services towards Mannheim/Groß-Rohrheim
5	210 m	76 cm	Services towards Neu-Edingen

== Operations ==
=== Passenger services ===
The station is usually served every hour by trains on line S9 of the Rhine-Neckar S-Bahn (Groß‑Rohrheim – Mannheim Hbf – Karlsruhe Hbf). During the weekday peak hour there are service at intervals of half an hour, or even a quarter of an hour. Every second train starts or ends in Graben-Neudorf rather than Karlsruhe. Regionalbahn services on line RB 67 run hourly between Mannheim and Karlsruhe, stopping at least in Graben-Neudorf, Waghäusel, Hockenheim, Oftersheim and Schwetzingen.

Passenger services in the 2023 timetable
Train service	Route	Frequency
S9	Karlsruhe Hbf – Graben-Neudorf – Waghäusel – Hockenheim – Schwetzingen – Mannheim Hbf – Mannheim-Waldhof – Lampertheim – Biblis – Groß Rohrheim	Hourly (extra services every half-hour during the peak hour)
RB 67	Karlsruhe Hbf – Graben-Neudorf – Waghäusel – Hockenheim – Schwetzingen – Mannheim Hbf	Hourly

=== Connections to urban transport ===
The Schwetzingen–Ketsch tramway operated from 1910 to 1938. Between 1927 and 1974, the Heidelberg-Eppelheim-Plankstadt-Schwetzingen tramway of the HSB also ended in Schwetzingen. Today bus routes of Busverkehr Rhein-Neckar (BRN, a subsidiary of DB) connect to the neighbouring cities of Mannheim and Heidelberg, stopping at the bus station in front of Schwetzingen station.

Schwetzingen is in the area where fares are set by the Verkehrsverbund Rhein-Neckar (Rhine-Neckar Transport Association, VRN). Within the town, a special fare applies: since the beginning of 2002 a single bus ride for adults in Schwetzingen costs 50 cents and fares for children cost only 25 cents.
