= Riedbahn =

The Riedbahn (Ried Railway) refers to various railways in southern Hesse, Germany:

- the Darmstadt–Worms railway (original route),
- the Mannheim–Frankfurt railway (current route),
- the western section of the Weinheim–Worms railway (former connecting line),
- the Western Entrance to the Riedbahn,
- Riedbahn, a suburb of Weiterstadt, Hesse.
