= Weinheim–Worms railway =

Non-electrified standard-gauge railway

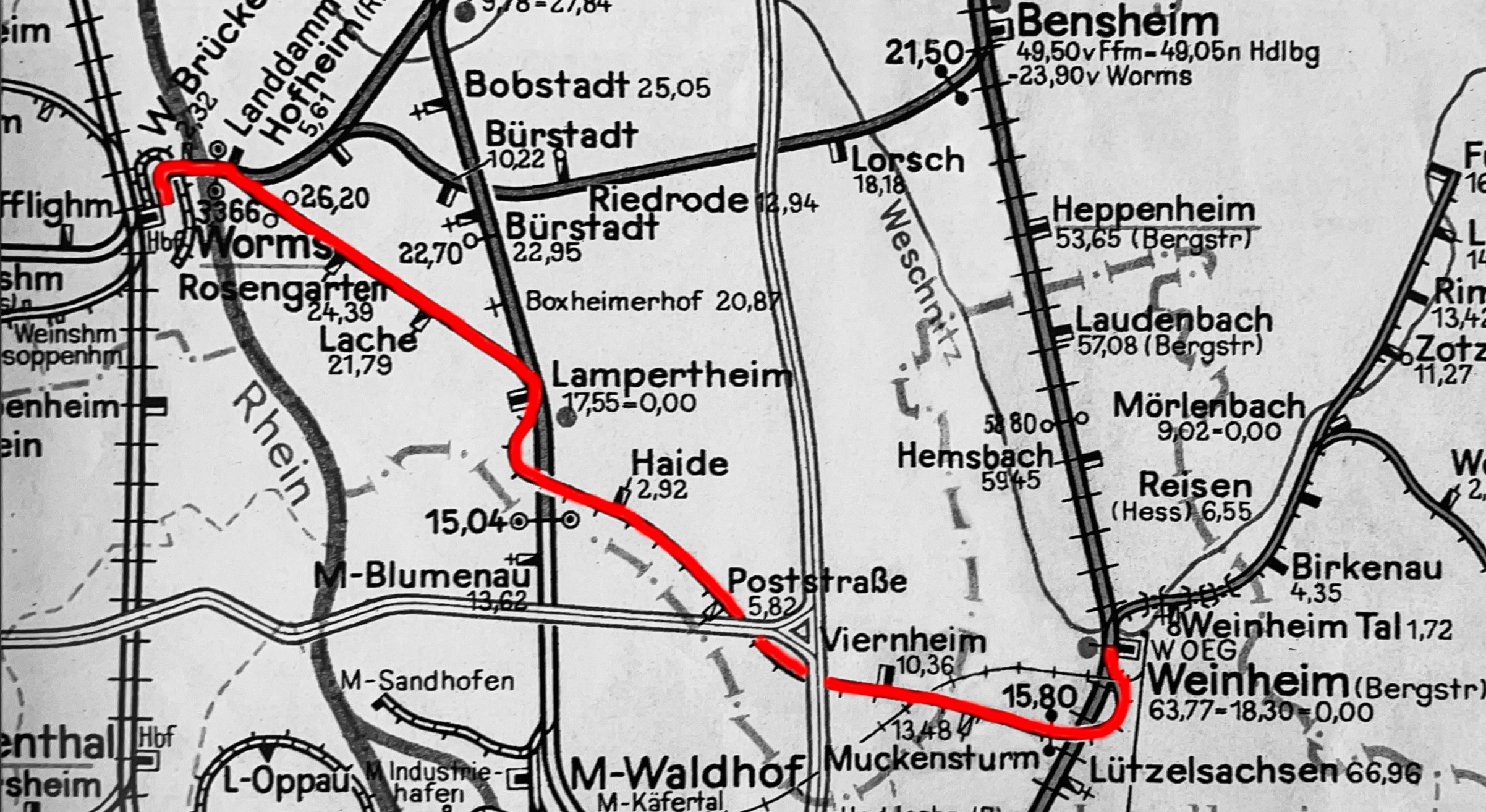
- Bahnstrecke Weinheim-Worms

Overview
- Line number: 3575 (Worms–Lampertheim); 3578 (Lampertheim–Weinheim)
- Locale: Hesse, Baden-Württemberg, Rhineland-Palatinate, Germany

Service
- Route number: 315g

Technical
- Line length: 30.8 km (19.1 mi)
- Track gauge: 1,435 mm (4 ft 8 1/2 in) standard gauge

The Weinheim–Worms railway (popularly known as the Wormser Hex, "Worms witch") is a non-electrified standard-gauge railway that formerly connected Weinheim, Viernheim, Lampertheim and Worms. Freight is operated on an approximately 4 km long section from Lampertheim towards Worms.

== History ==
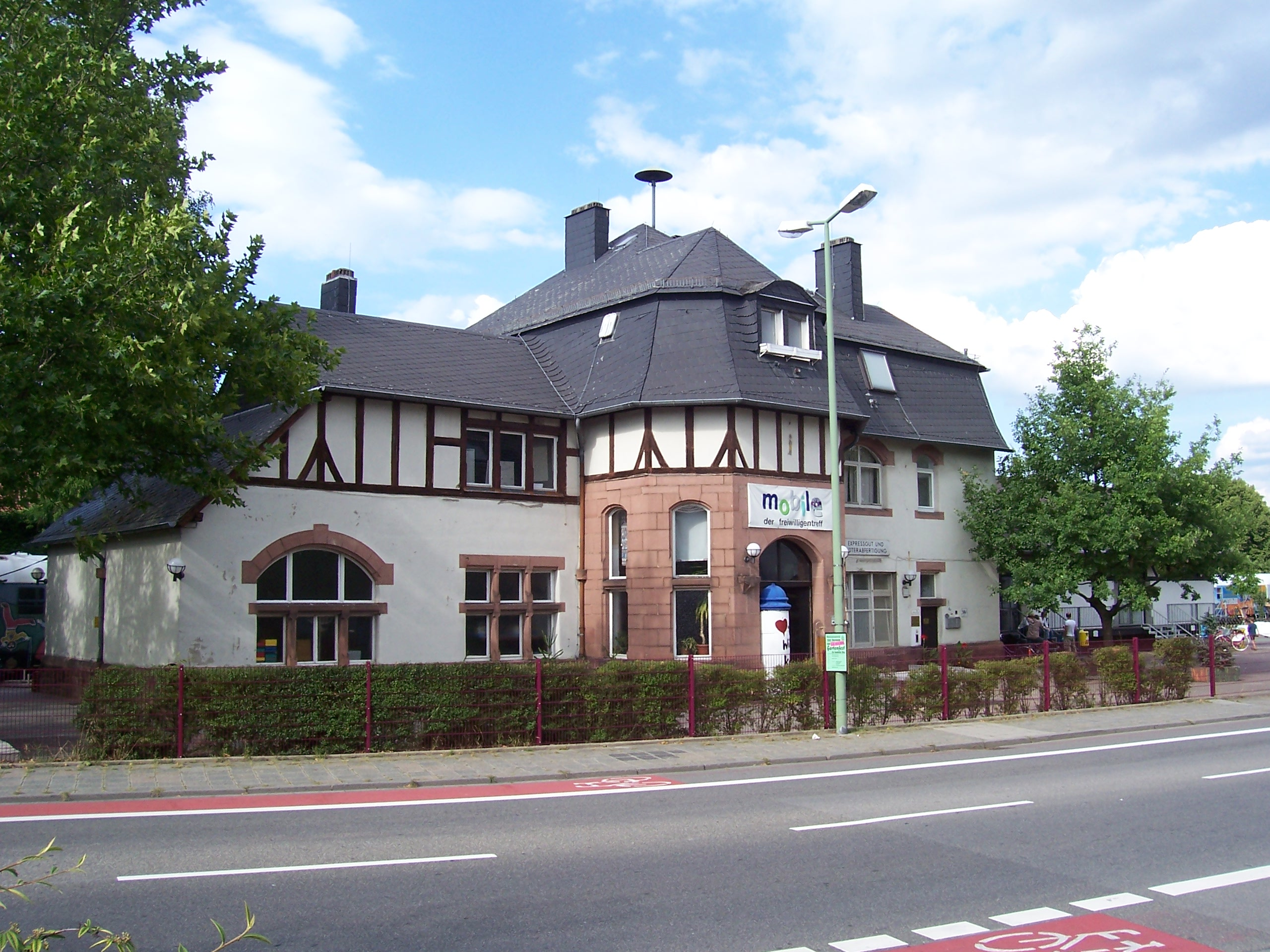
The former Viernheim station

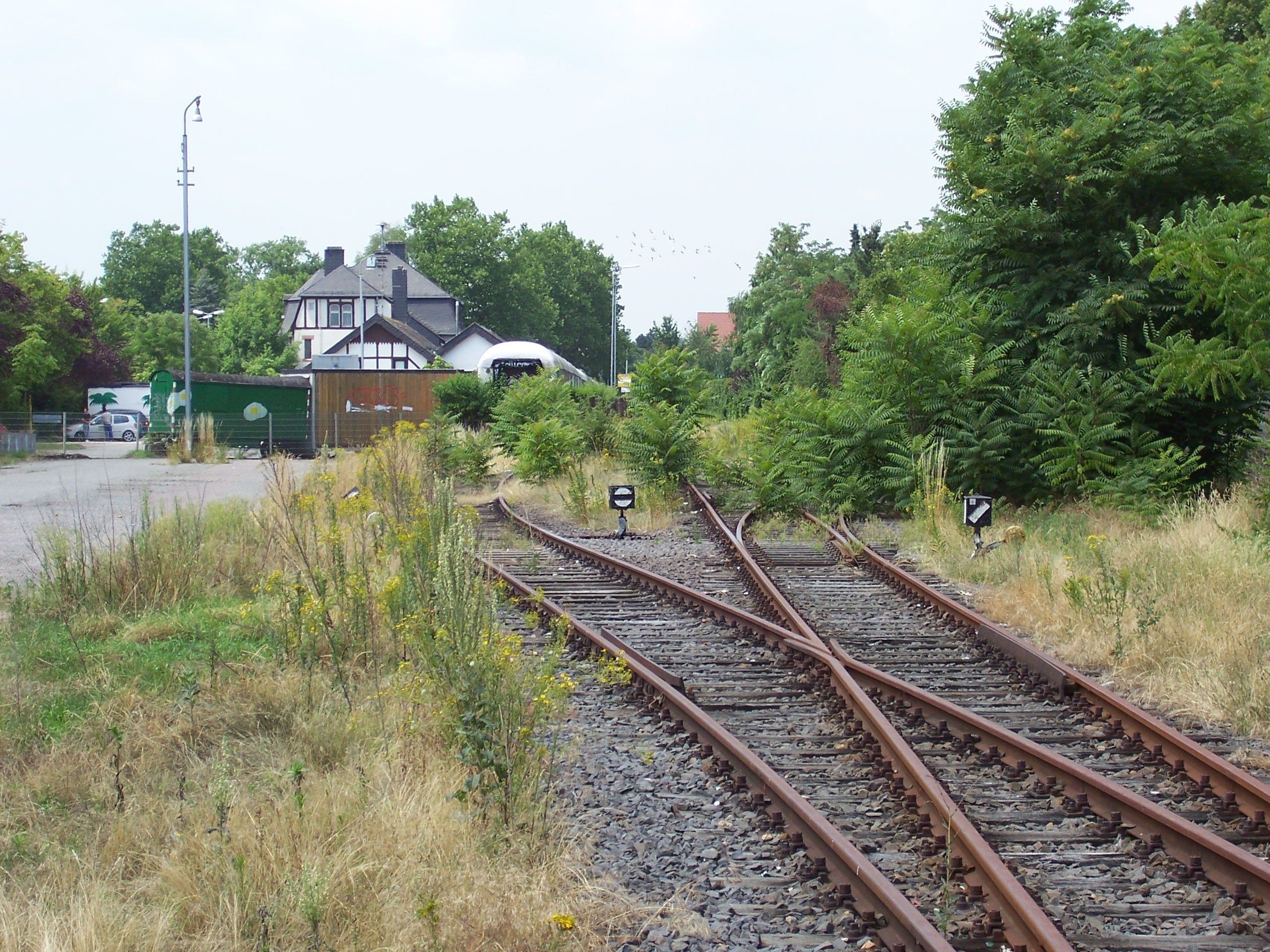
Abandoned tracks in Viernheim station

Plans to develop the land in the Rhine Valley below the Odenwald with a railway, which started in the 1860s, always had an objective of building a connection to Worms. The original plan saw Bensheim or Heppenheim as a starting point of the Odenwald line, but the Nibelung Railway was opened in 1869 from Bensheim via Lorsch to Worms and a branch was opened from Lorsch to Heppenheim in 1903.

However, the final route was different: instead of running to Odenwald in Hesse-Darmstadt, it was built to Weinheim in Baden because it was easier to build. The construction of the Weschnitz Valley Railway from Fürth im Odenwald through the Weschnitz valley to Weinheim began in 1893 and it was opened in 1895. Construction of the Überwald Railway, which branches off the Weschnitz Valley Railway in Mörlenbach and ran via Wald-Michelbach to Wahlen, began in 1998 and it was opened in 1901.

In order to provide the originally planned connection to Worms, a link was built from Weinheim via Viernheim to Lampertheim, which opened in 1905. Traffic ran from Lampertheim over tracks built as part of the Riedbahn (see Mannheim–Frankfurt railway) in 1877.

However, traffic on this link was not very great, since, against expectations, a majority of the traffic ran to and from the metropolitan area of Mannheim. There was also strong competition with the OEG, which operates a metre gauge railway from Weinheim via Viernheim to Mannheim.

Passenger services on the Weinheim–Lampertheim route were abandoned in 1960 and the tracks between Viernheim and Lampertheim were later dismantled (the route can still be recognised as a cleared path in the forest). The section of the line to Weinheim was retained for freight for industry based in Viernheim until 2002, then it was abandoned as part of the Marktorientierte Angebot Cargo, a nationwide program for the rationalisation of Deutsche Bahn’s freight facilities.

Deutsche Bahn (DB) bus service 5521 ran as a substitute between Weinheim and Worms, but it departed from the railway route (running through Hüttenfeld, Neuschloß and Rosengarten and not serving Muckensturm). Until 15 June 2008, the service now numbered 644 was operated by Busverkehr Rhein-Neckar, a DB subsidiary. Following a European tender of the service in 2007, it has been operated since 15 June 2008 by Werner GmbH & Co., a subsidiary of Abellio and now operates only between Worms and Viernheim.

Viernheim station now houses a municipal leisure and meeting place called Treff im Bahnhof (T.i.B., "meeting in the station"). In addition to the station buildings it uses old railway carriages parked at the station.

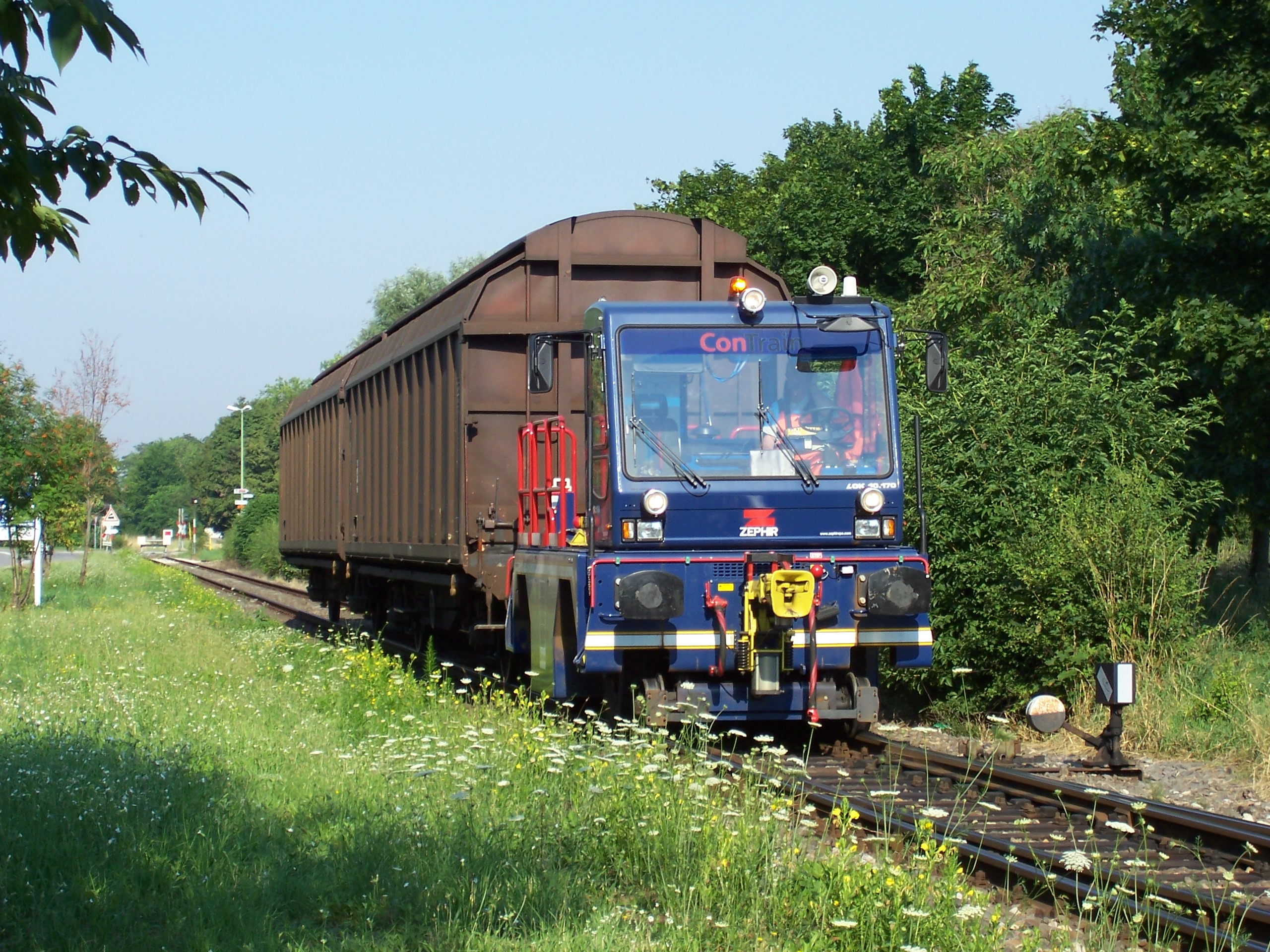
A road-rail vehicle hauling freight waggons in Viernheim in July 2005

The Weinheim–Viernheim freight line was repaired in June 2004 and served a central warehouse of Spedition Pfenning, a transport subsidiary of the Henkel Group from 6 July 2004. The cost of the track repairs, amounting to €360,000, was 75% funded by the state of Hesse and 25% by the municipality of Viernheim.

The line in Viernheim was shortened to stop at a buffer stop before the crossing of the Wiesenstraße and some sets of points were dismantled. Trains were hauled by a road-rail vehicle in accordance with the "regulations on the construction and operation of railway sidings" (Verordnung über den Bau und Betrieb von Anschlussbahnen). However, between 9 September 2004 and 8 March 2005, a derogation was given for the occasional operation of passenger trains on tours.

== Current situation ==
The Henkel company ended its transport operations in Viernheim on 31 December 2010. As a result, all regular rail operations on the line have ended and no other traffic is likely. The future of the remaining sections of the line is thus is doubt.
