= Weinheim (Bergstraße) Hauptbahnhof =

Station in Weinheim, Baden-Württemberg, Germany

Weinheim (Bergstraße)
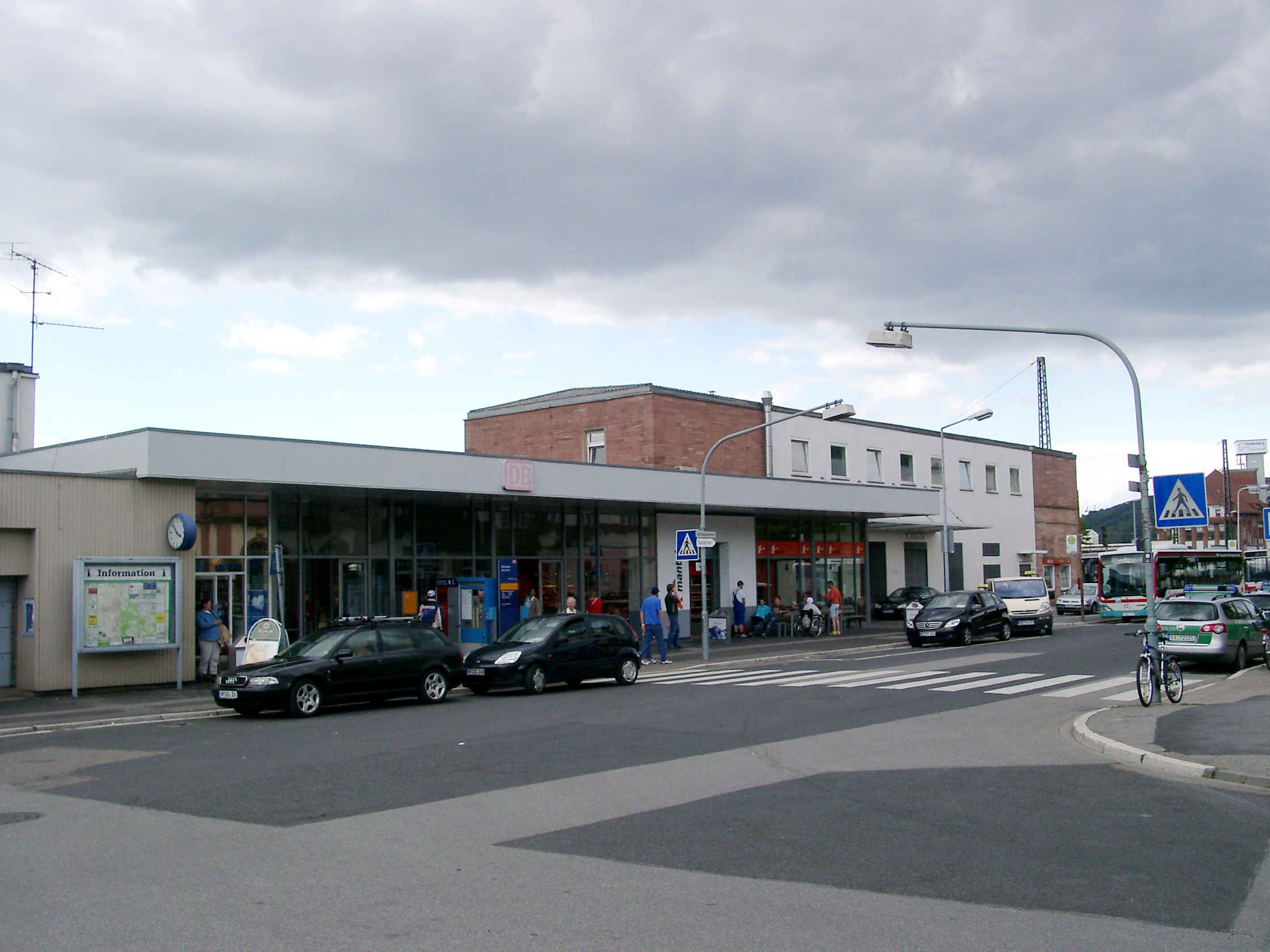

General information
- Location: Weinheim, Baden-Württemberg; Germany
- Coordinates: 49°33′12″N 8°39′55″E
- Owner: DB Netz
- Operator: DB Station&Service
- Lines: Main-Neckar Railway (63.8 km); Weschnitz Valley Railway (0.0 km); Weinheim–Worms railway (30.8 km) (currently only freight)
- Platforms: 6

Construction
- Accessible: Yes

Other information
- Station code: 6622
- DS100 code: RWE
- IBNR: 8000377
- Category: 3
- Fare zone: VRN: 65; : 4830 (VRN transitional tariff)
- Website: www.bahnhof.de

History
- Opened: 1846
Services
Preceding station	DB Fernverkehr	Following station
Bensheim towards Berlin Ostbahnhof	ICE 13	Heidelberg Hbf towards Karlsruhe Hbf or Stuttgart Hbf
Bensheim towards Bremen Hbf	ICE 26	Heidelberg Hbf towards Karlsruhe Hbf
Bensheim towards Frankfurt (Main) Hbf	ICE 62	Heidelberg Hbf towards Graz Hbf
Bensheim towards Frankfurt (Main) Hbf	IC 87	Heidelberg Hbf towards Singen (Hohentwiel)
Darmstadt Hbf towards Frankfurt (Main) Hbf	ICE 89	Heidelberg Hbf One-way operation
Preceding station	DB Regio Mitte	Following station
Hemsbach towards Frankfurt (Main) Hbf	RE 60	Ladenburg towards Mannheim Hbf
Hemsbach towards Frankfurt (Main) Hbf	RB 68	Weinheim-Lützelsachsen towards Wiesloch-Walldorf
Terminus	RB 69	Birkenau towards Fürth (Odenw)
Preceding station	Rhine-Neckar S-Bahn	Following station
Weinheim-Lützelsachsen towards Mainz Hbf	S6	Hemsbach towards Bensheim
Location

Weinheim (Bergstraße) Hauptbahnhof is a station in the town of Weinheim in the German state of Baden-Württemberg. It is served by Intercity services on the Main-Neckar Railway between Frankfurt and Heidelberg/Mannheim. The Weschnitz Valley Railway (Weschnitztalbahn) to Furth in the Odenwald starts at Weinheim station. There is also a freight railway to Viernheim, the last remaining section of the former Weinheim–Worms railway.

== History ==
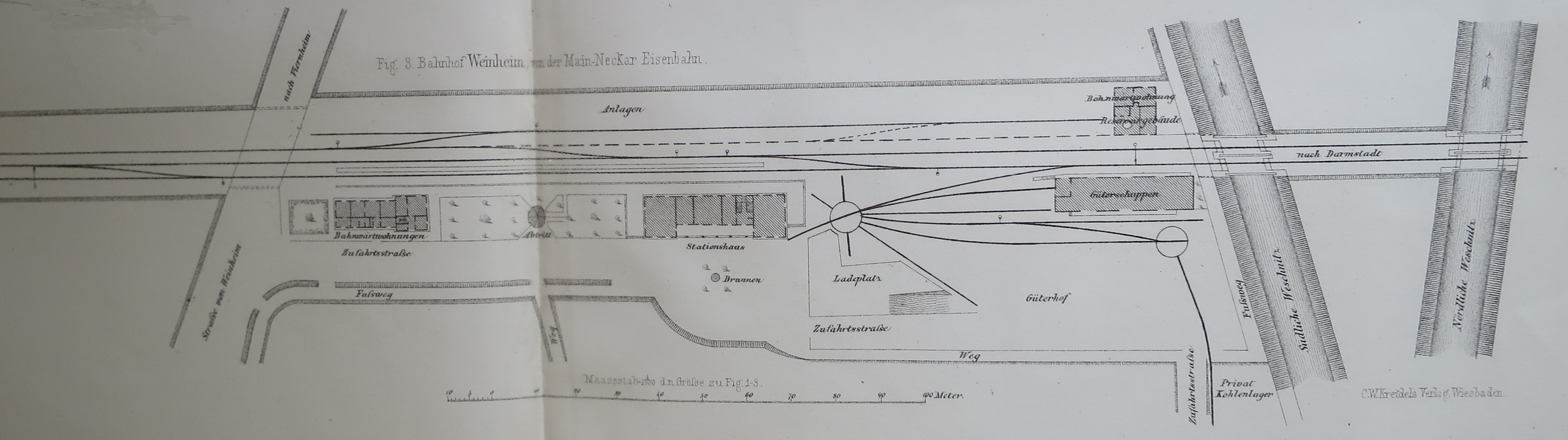
Track plan from 1870

The first Weinheim station was opened here with the opening of the Main-Neckar Railway from Frankfurt am Main to Heidelberg and Mannheim on 1 August 1846. With the opening of the Weinheim–Worms railway in 1905, the station received new signal systems. In 1909, the station layout was extended, for which a construction division of the Grand Duchy of Baden State Railway had been established on 1 June 1909.

The station building was substantially renovated and the canopy of the "home" platform was refurbished as part of an economic stimulus program from 2008/09 to 2011.

From 2015 to 2017, platforms A, B and C (tracks 1–4) were renewed and adapted for the disabled, increased to a height of 76 cm and each fitted with a passenger lift. In addition, an entrance was built from the west side. This cost about €8.71 million. The municipality and the district each provided €1.63 m of the costs, while the state of Baden-WÜrttemberg provided €1.88 m. The renovation was also funded with €3.57 m under the federal Municipal Transport Financing Act (Gemeindeverkehrsfinanzierungsgesetz).

The station was renamed from Weinheim (Bergstr) to Weinheim (Bergstr) Hbf in August 2018.

== Public transport ==
The station is connected by the Oberrheinische Eisenbahn-Gesellschaft (Upper Rhine Railway Company, OEG) with the rest of the Rhine-Neckar region. It runs from here to Viernheim, Mannheim and Heidelberg. The OEG stop at Weinheim station is called Luisenstraße, while the OEG's own Weinheim station is about 400 metres further south.

There is a bus connection to city and regional lines and a call taxi service.

== Rail services ==
In the 2026 timetable, the following services stop at the station:

=== Long-distance services ===
Line	Route		Frequency
ICE 13	Berlin Ostbahnhof – Berlin – Wolfsburg – Braunschweig – Kassel – Frankfurt South – Darmstadt – Weinheim (Bergstraße) – Heidelberg –	Karlsruhe	Every four hours
ICE 13	Berlin Ostbahnhof – Berlin – Wolfsburg – Braunschweig – Kassel – Frankfurt South – Darmstadt – Weinheim (Bergstraße) – Heidelberg –	Stuttgart	Every four hours
ICE 26	Bremen – Hanover – Kassel-Wilhelmshöhe – Gießen – Frankfurt – Darmstadt – Weinheim – Heidelberg – Karlsruhe		Every 4 hours
ICE 62	Frankfurt – Darmstadt – Weinheim – Stuttgart – Munich – Salzburg		2 train services
IC 87	Frankfurt – Heidelberg – Stuttgart – Singen		Some trains

=== Regional and S-Bahn services ===
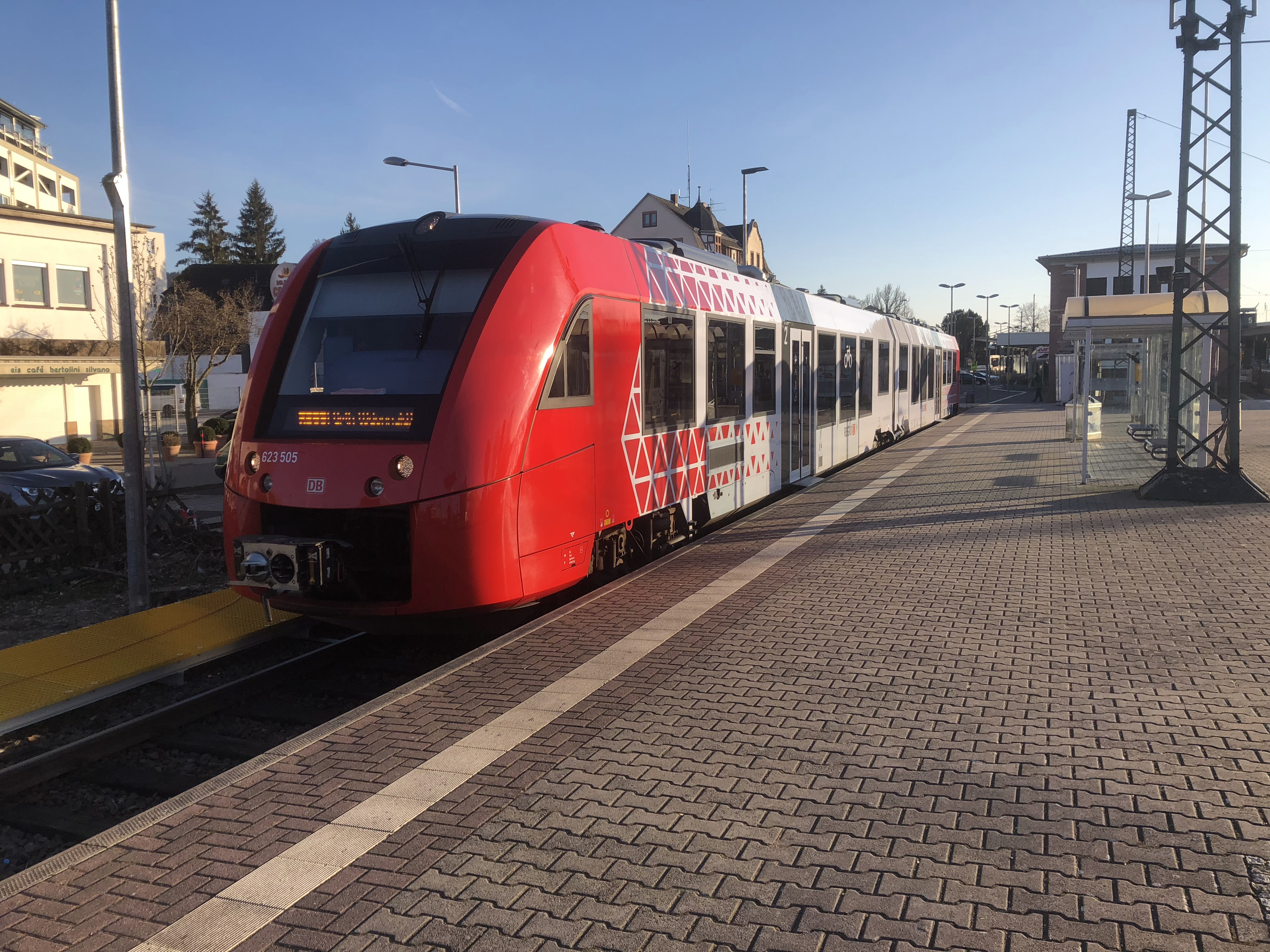
Weschnitz Valley Railway class 623 diesel multiple unit in Weinheim station (2018)

Regionalbahn service RB 68 runs hourly to Frankfurt (Main) or Heidelberg. It combination with line S6 of the Rhine-Neckar S-Bahn, there is an approximately half-hour cycle between Bensheim and Neu-Edingen/Friedrichsfeld during the day. Every two hours, there is a Regional-Express service to Frankfurt (Main) and Mannheim. Regionalbahn service RB 69 serves the Weschnitz Valley every half hour; services run hourly on the weekend.

Line	Route	Frequency
RE 60	Frankfurt (Main) – Darmstadt – Bensheim – Weinheim (Bergstr) – Mannheim	Every two hours
RB 68	Frankfurt (Main) – Darmstadt – Bensheim – Weinheim (Bergstr) – Neu-Edingen/Friedrichsfeld – Heidelberg (– Wiesloch-Walldorf)	Hourly
RB 69	(Ludwigshafen (Rhein) – Mannheim –) Weinheim (Bergstr) – Birkenau – Mörlenbach – Rimbach – Fürth (Odenw)	Every half hour (Sat/Sun hourly)
S6	Bensheim – Weinheim (Bergstr) – Neu-Edingen/Friedrichsfeld – Mannheim – Ludwigshafen (Rhein) – Frankenthal Hbf – Worms Hbf – Mainz Hbf	Hourly

== Platforms ==
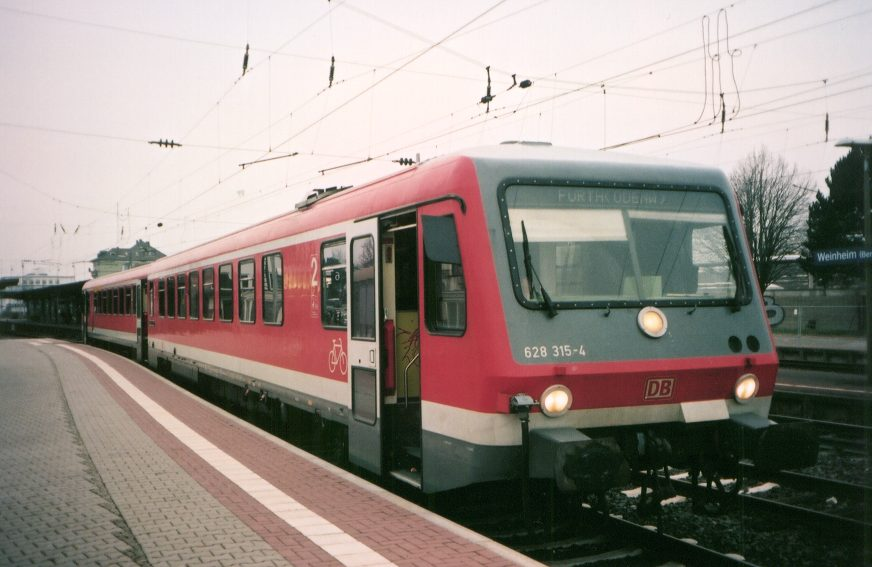
Class 628 diesel multiple unit on the Weschnitz Valley Railway on track 6 in Weinheim station (2005)

Weinheim station has six platform tracks. Tracks 1, 5 and 6 are used for the Weschnitz Valley Railway and the other three tracks are used by passenger and freight trains on the Main-Neckar Railway. In the event of unscheduled overtaking moves by freight or long-distance trains, commuter trains to Frankfurt use track 1. The platforms are connected by two subways.

== Freight ==
In earlier times, Weinheim station had a large and busy freight and marshalling yard. Its largest customer was the Freudenberg Group, which was based in Weinheim and transported its goods via rail over a dedicated connection. Today, most tracks have been removed, only the overgrown track area and the signal boxes are still preserved.
