= Bensheim station =

Railway station in Hesse, Germany

Bensheim
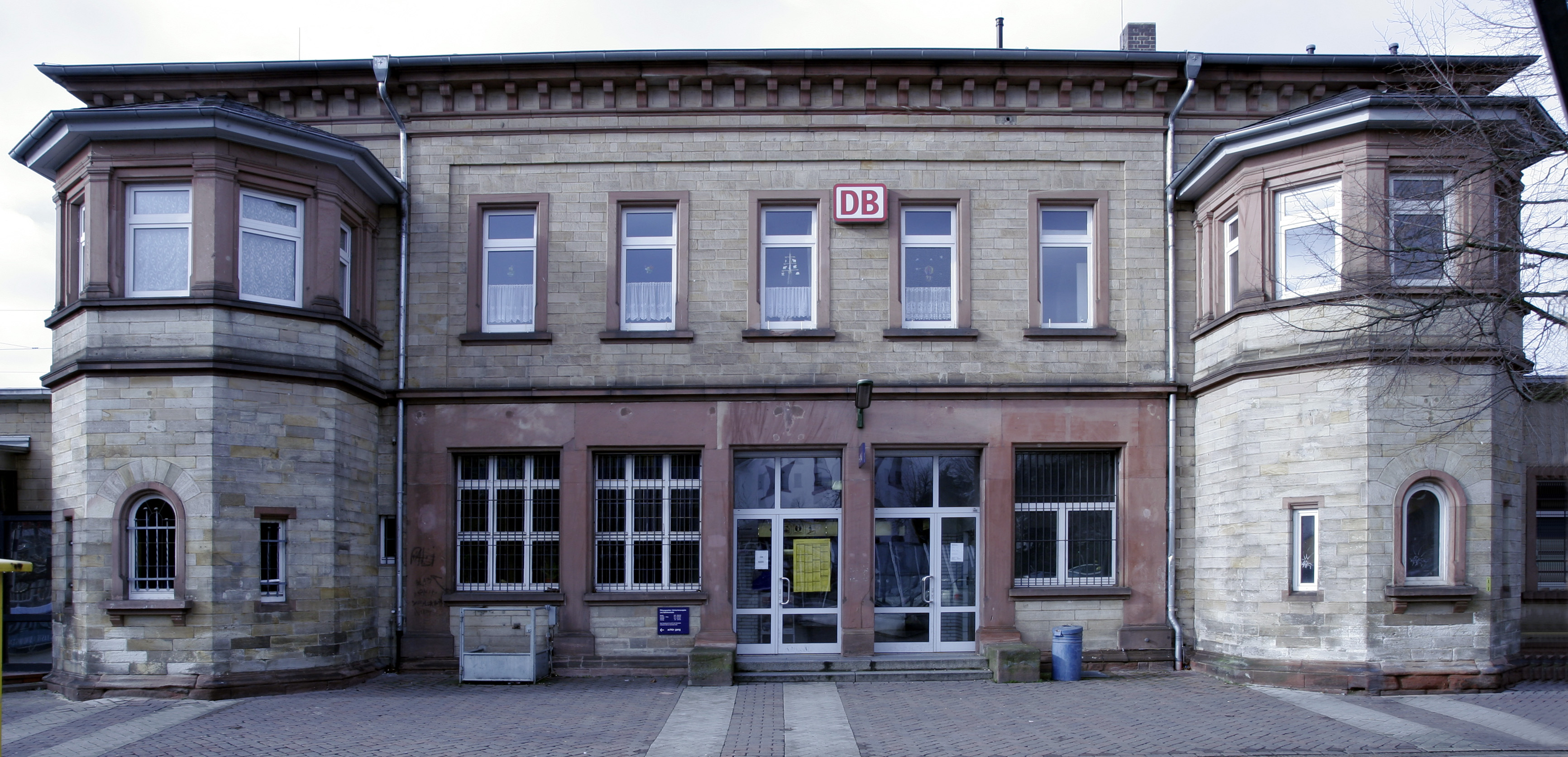

General information
- Location: Amershamplatz 1, Bensheim, Hesse; Germany
- Coordinates: 49°40′57″N 8°37′0″E
- Owner: Deutsche Bahn
- Operator: DB Station&Service
- Lines: Main-Neckar Railway (49.5 km) (KBS 650; Nibelung Railway (23.9 km) (KBS 653)
- Platforms: 4

Construction
- Accessible: Yes
- Architectural style: Neoclassical

Other information
- Station code: 488
- DS100 code: FBH
- IBNR: 8000031
- Category: 4
- Fare zone: VRN: 35; : 4510 (VRN transitional tariff)
- Website: www.bahnhof.de

History
- Opened: 1846
Services
Preceding station	DB Fernverkehr	Following station
Darmstadt Hbf towards Berlin Ostbahnhof	ICE 13	Weinheim (Bergstraße) Hbf towards Karlsruhe Hbf or Stuttgart Hbf
Darmstadt Hbf towards Ostseebad Binz	ICE 15	Mannheim Hbf towards Saarbrücken Hbf
Darmstadt Hbf towards Bremen Hbf	ICE 26	Weinheim (Bergstraße) Hbf towards Karlsruhe Hbf
Darmstadt Hbf towards Frankfurt (Main) Hbf	ICE 62	Weinheim (Bergstraße) Hbf towards Graz Hbf
Darmstadt Hbf towards Frankfurt (Main) Hbf	IC 87	Weinheim (Bergstraße) Hbf towards Singen (Hohentwiel)
Preceding station	DB Regio Mitte	Following station
Zwingenberg (Bergstraße) towards Frankfurt (Main) Hbf	RE 60	Heppenheim (Bergstraße) towards Mannheim Hbf
Bensheim-Auerbach towards Frankfurt (Main) Hbf	RB 68	Heppenheim (Bergstraße) towards Wiesloch-Walldorf
Terminus	RB 63	Lorsch towards Worms Hbf
Preceding station	Rhine-Neckar S-Bahn	Following station
Terminus	S6	Heppenheim (Bergstraße) towards Mainz Hbf
Location
- Location within Hesse Location within Germany Location within Europe

Bensheim station is in the town of Bensheim on the Main-Neckar Railway, connecting Frankfurt and Heidelberg, in the German state of Hesse. The station is also the beginning and end of the single-track non-electrified Worms–Bensheim line (Nibelung Railway). 114 trains stop at Bensheim station every day, of which about one-third are long-distance services. It is classified by Deutsche Bahn as a category 3 station. Bensheim station is protected as a cultural monument under the Hessian heritage legislation.

== History ==
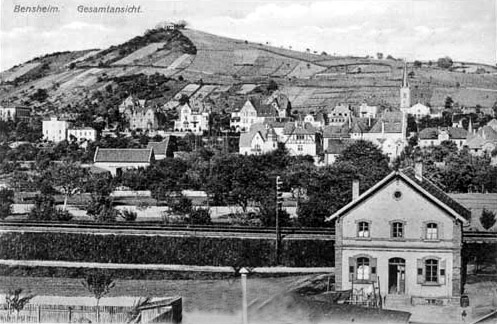
The railway in 1907

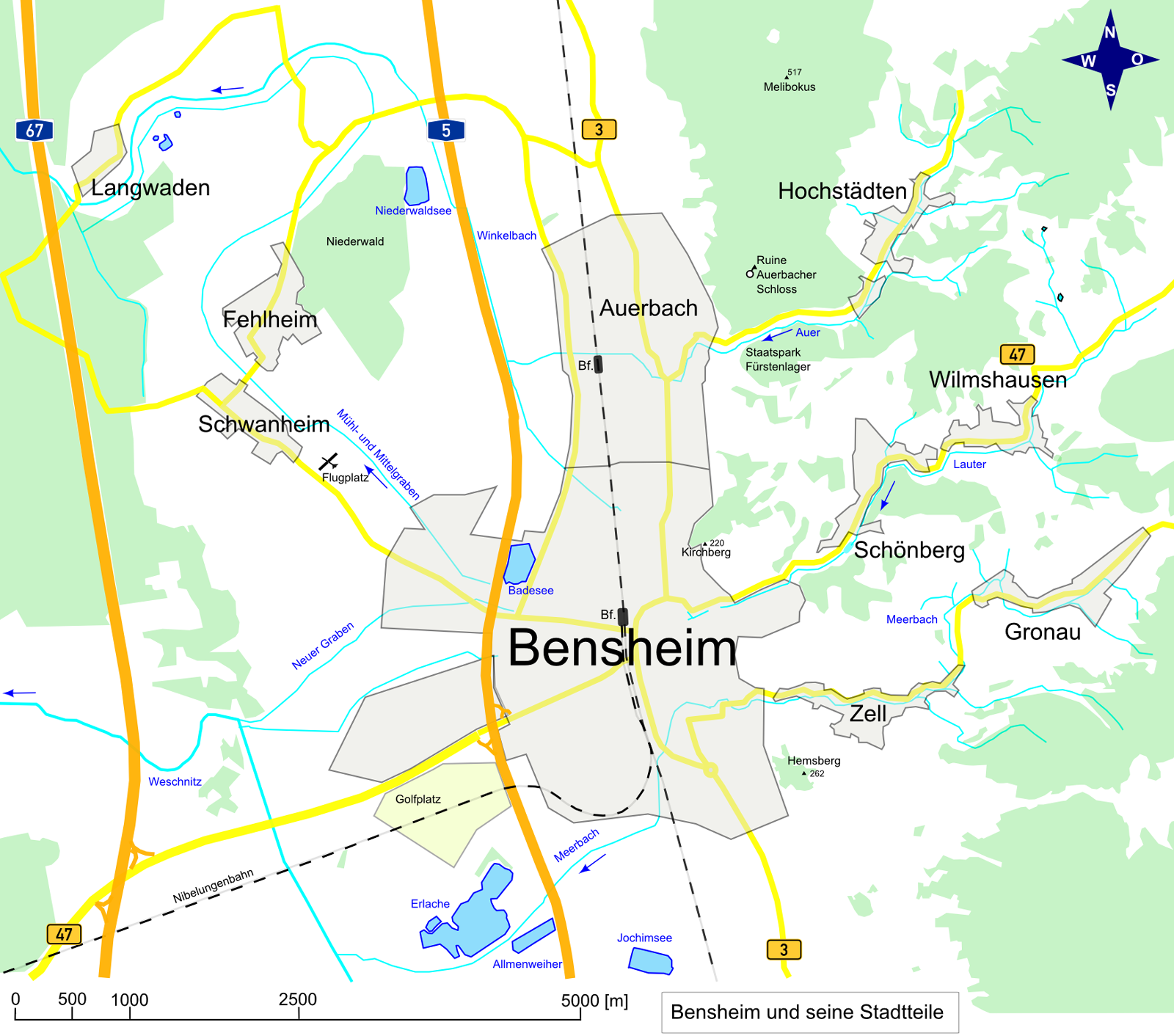
The station in central Bensheim

Almost eleven years after the Adler locomotive began to run over the Bavarian Ludwig Railway between Nuremberg and Fürth, the Main-Neckar Railway was opened in 1846. Bensheim station was opened in the same year. The building of this artery through three small states in the Rhine valley stimulated trade and industry throughout the region. In 1851, the Auerbach district—then still a separate municipality—gained its own station.

In 1869, the Nibelungen railway, a section of the Hessian Ludwig Railway (German: Hessische Ludwigsbahn, HLB) was put into operation between Bensheim and Worms. Bensheim now had two railway stations, operated by two railway companies, which were not connected by rail with each other until 1872. As early as 1869 there were plans to extend the Ludwigs Railway to the Odenwald via the Lauter valley to Lindenfels and Reichelsheim to improve transport links. But further attempts to realise this project in 1895, 1925 and 1926 ultimately failed. Between 1910 and 1912, the railway was raised on an embankment through the city area.

In the mid 1990s Bensheim’s freight yard was closed and a few years later the dismantling of its tracks began.

The Rhine-Neckar S-Bahn was extended to run between Bensheim and Mannheim in December 2018. This required the raising of the level of the platforms to the standard height of S-Bahn platforms (76 cm). The station was also renovated, at a cost of €7.5 million, including an extension of the platforms, so that even long-distance trains can stop at them. The station is now fully accessible with lifts and escalators.

== Entrance building ==
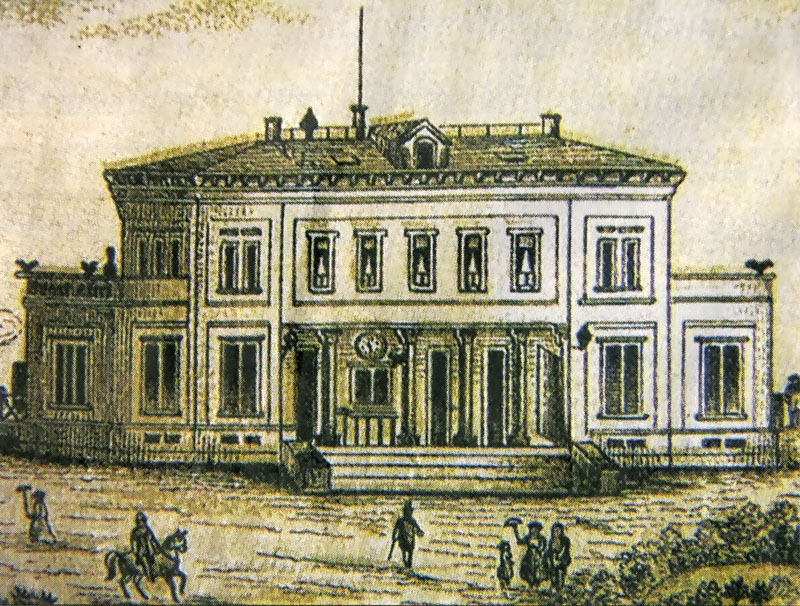
The station in 1882, after a lithograph by Albin Hermann Georg Strauss

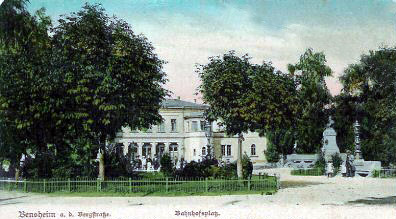
The station in 1907

The station building in 1845 was built to plans by Georg Moller in a neoclassical style on the eastern side of the line towards the city. The two-coloured facade of the two-storey, sandstone building had nine bay window around a central group of five windows. In 1900, the outer parts of the facade were replaced by two symmetrically arranged octagonal pavilions designed as porches with further lateral extensions. The eaves of the flat hip roof is decorated with a spiral scroll-like frieze (volute). After Florsheim station, it is the oldest completely preserved station building in Hesse.

== Platforms ==
- Track 1 serves long-distance and regional services towards Darmstadt and Frankfurt am Main
- Track 2 serves long-distance and regional services towards Mannheim and Heidelberg
- Track 3 serves regional services towards Mannheim and Mainz
- Track 4 is used for regional services on the Nibelungen line towards Worms.

== Train services ==
In the 2026 timetable, the following services stop at the station:

=== Long-distance services ===
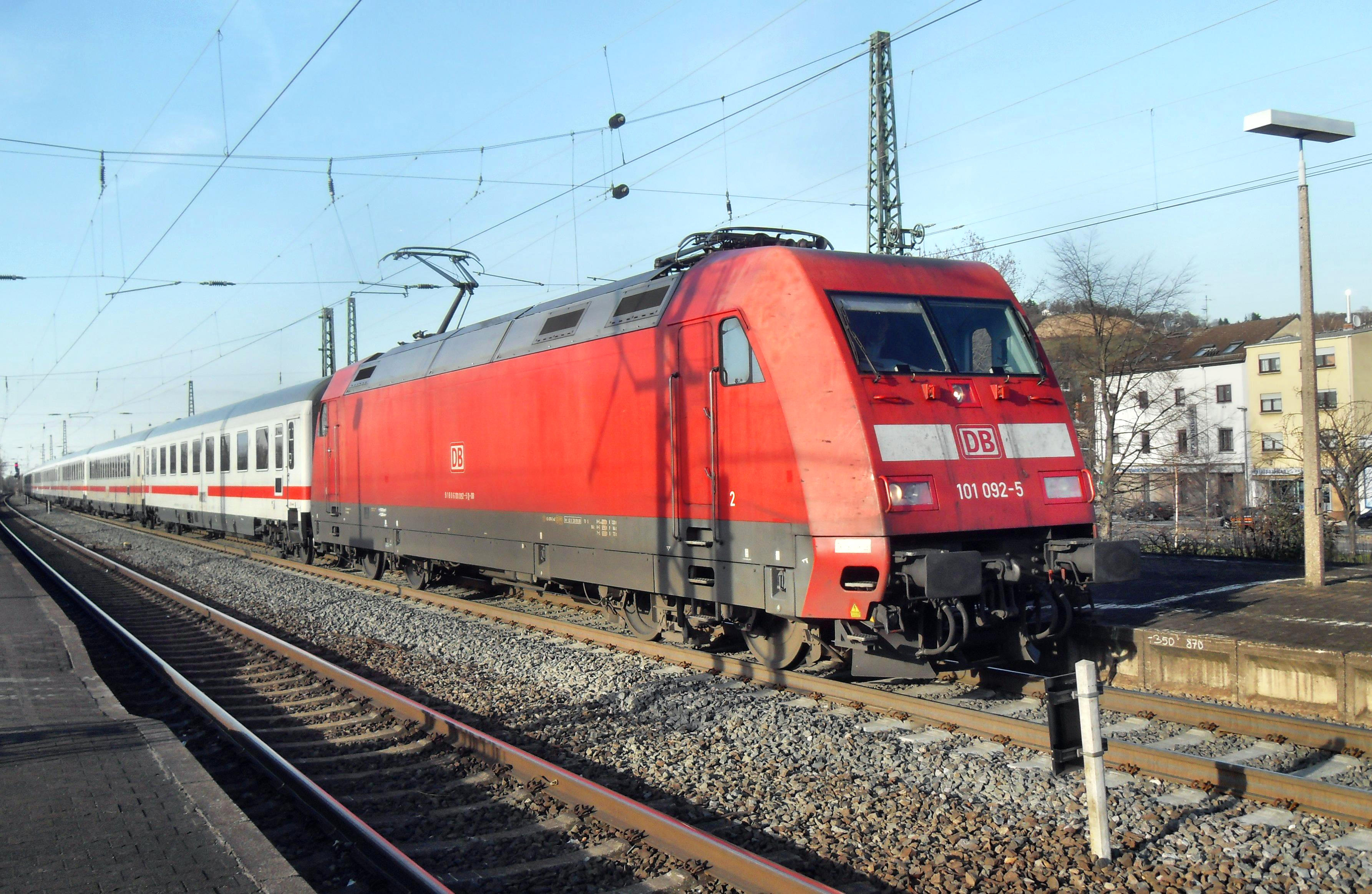
EuroCity in Bensheim station

Line	Route		Frequency
ICE 13	Berlin Ostbahnhof – Berlin – Wolfsburg – Braunschweig – Kassel – Frankfurt South – Darmstadt – Bensheim – Heidelberg –	Karlsruhe	Every four hours
ICE 13	Berlin Ostbahnhof – Berlin – Wolfsburg – Braunschweig – Kassel – Frankfurt South – Darmstadt – Bensheim – Heidelberg –	Stuttgart	Every four hours
ICE 15	Binz – Stralsund – Eberswalde – Berlin – Halle – Erfurt – Frankfurt – Darmstadt – Bensheim – Mannheim – Kaiserslautern – Saarbrücken		Once a day
ICE 26	Bremen Hbf – Hanover – Kassel-Wilhelmshöhe – Gießen – Frankfurt – Darmstadt – Bensheim – Heidelberg – Karlsruhe		Every 4 hours
ICE 62	Frankfurt – Darmstadt – Bensheim – Stuttgart – Munich – Salzburg – Villach – Klagenfurt – Graz		2 train pairs
IC 87	Frankfurt – Heidelberg – Stuttgart – Singen		Individual services

=== Regional services ===
Line	Route	Frequency
RE 60	Frankfurt – Darmstadt – Bensheim – Weinheim (Bergstraße) – Mannheim	Every 1 or 2 hours
RB 63	Bensheim – Lorsch – Bürstadt – Worms	Hourly
RB 68	Frankfurt – Darmstadt – Bensheim – Weinheim (Bergstraße) – Neu-Edingen/Friedrichsfeld – Heidelberg	Hourly
S6	Bensheim – Weinheim (Bergstraße) – Neu-Edingen/Friedrichsfeld – Mannheim – Ludwigshafen Mitte – Ludwigshafen Hbf – Frankenthal – Worms – Mainz	Hourly

== Bus Station ==
The bus station is in front of the station building with seven bays and connections to the suburbs of Bensheim by Citybus, and to Lautertal, Bürstadt, Heppenheim, Jugenheim and Lorsch.
