= Main-Neckar Railway =

Main line railway in Germany

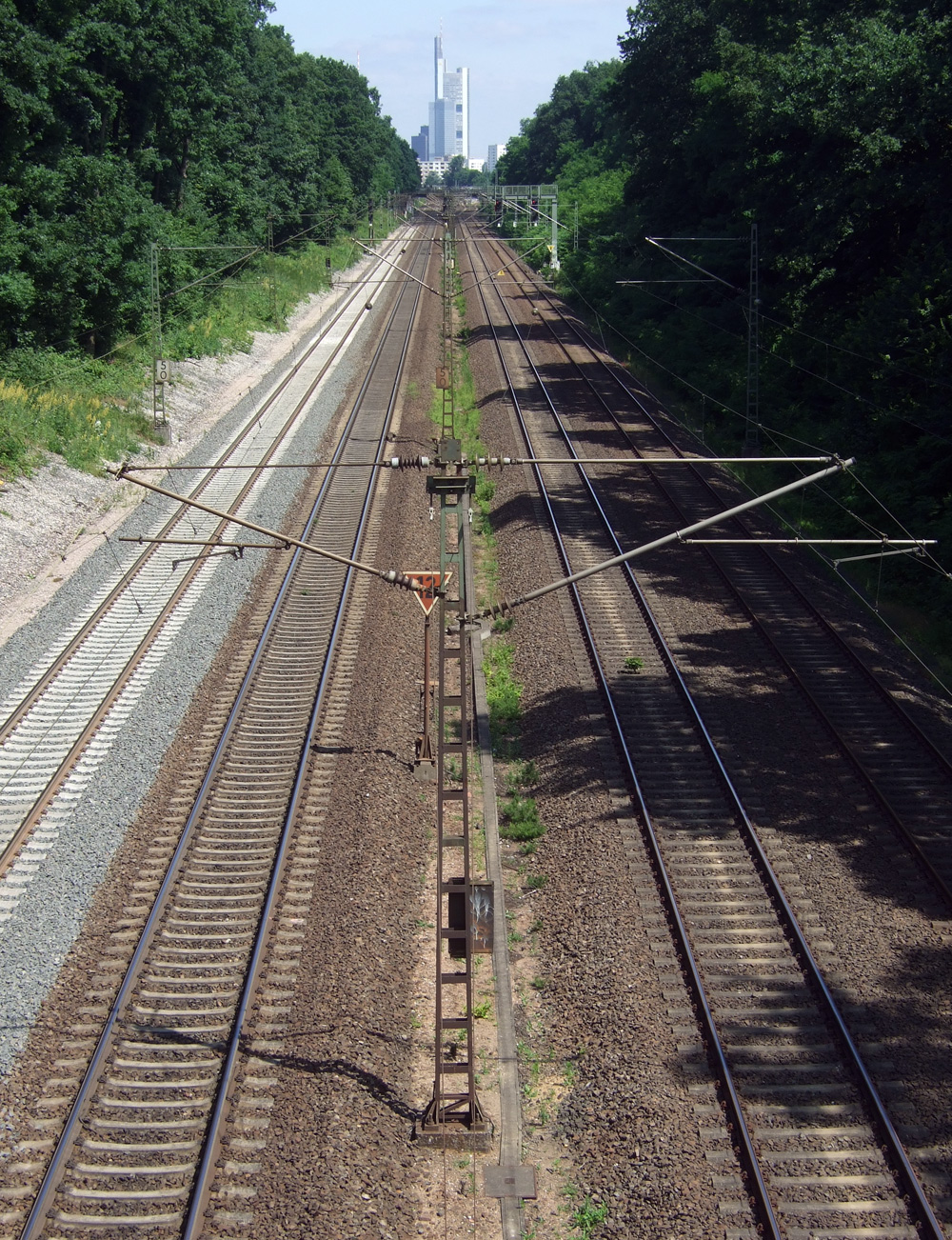
- Bahntrasse

Overview
- Native name: Main-Neckar-Bahn
- Line number: 3601
- Locale: Hesse, Baden-Württemberg, Germany

Service
- Route number: 650

Technical
- Line length: 87.5 km (54.4 mi)
- Track gauge: 1,435 mm (4 ft 8 1/2 in) standard gauge
- Electrification: 15 kV/16.7 Hz AC overhead catenary
- Operating speed: 160 km/h (99.4 mph) (max)

The Main-Neckar Railway (German: Main-Neckar–Eisenbahn, MNE) is a main line railway west of the Odenwald in the Upper Rhine Plain of Germany that connects Frankfurt am Main to Heidelberg via Darmstadt, Bensheim and Weinheim. It was opened in 1846 and is one of the oldest railways in Germany.

The railway line is part of the networks served by the Rhein-Main-Verkehrsverbund and Verkehrsverbund Rhein-Neckar.

== History ==
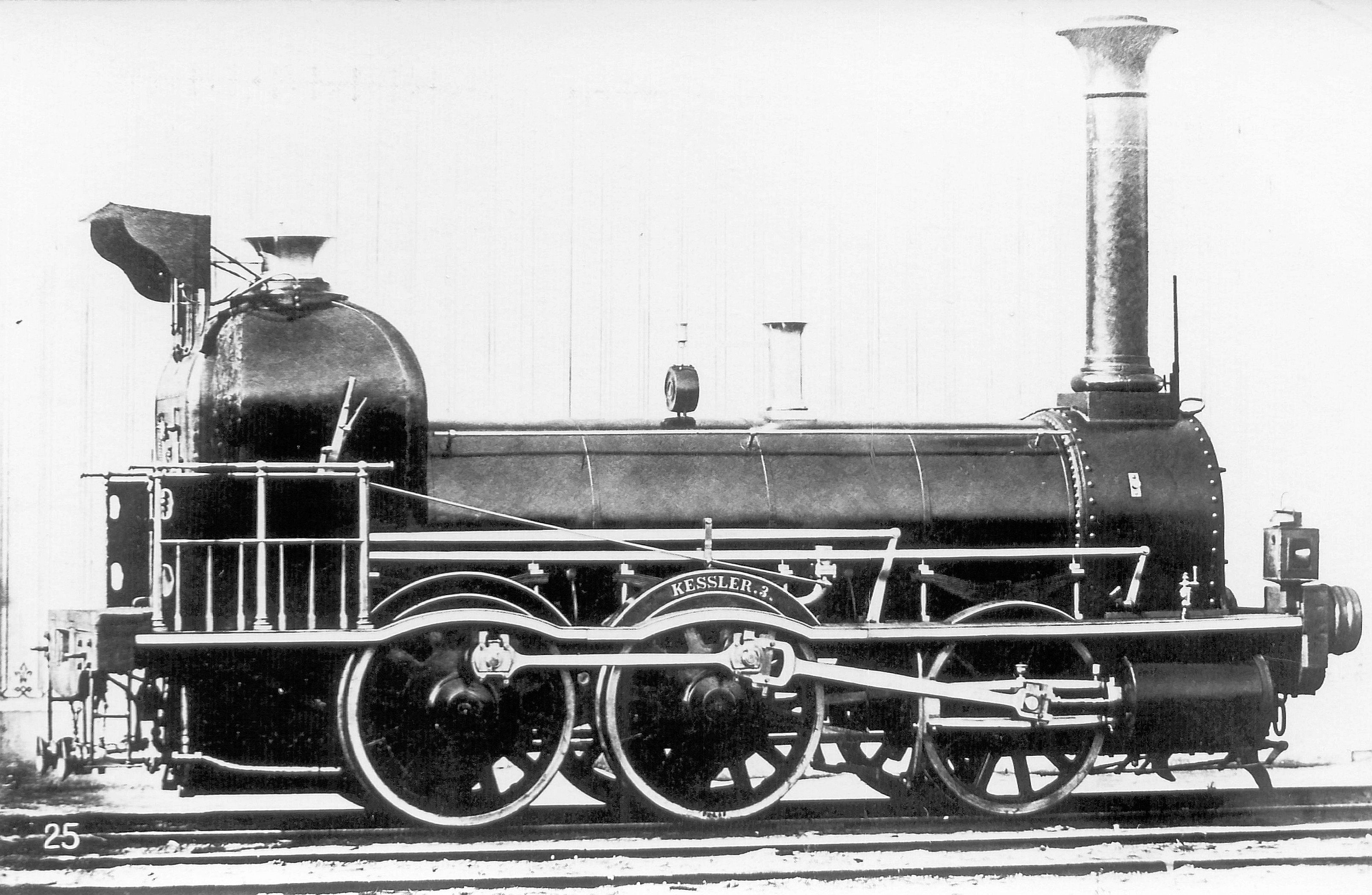
Loco # 3 of Main-Neckar-Bahn by Maschinenfabrik Esslingen (1846)

The Main-Neckar Railway was built and operated as a joint state railway company, known as a condominium railway (Kondominalbahn), by the Free City of Frankfurt, The Grand Duchy of Hesse-Darmstadt and the Grand Duchy of Baden.

=== Negotiations between the states ===
The plans for the railway dated back to 1835. However, years went by until the three states involved agreed on routes and how it would be organised. Not until 1838 was a treaty for the construction of a Railway from Frankfurt to Mannheim via Darmstadt agreed. The Hessian Railway Company could not raise the required capital and it was then dissolved. There was a second treaty signed of 21 and 23 March 1843, which agreed to build the Main-Neckar line at government expense and—as a compromise between the interests of Mannheim and Heidelberg—located the line centrally in Friedrichsfeld where it joined the Mannheim–Heidelberg line of the Grand Duchy of Baden State Railway. Baden requested that the line be built to 1600 mm broad gauge but could not gain agreement for this. Responsibility for funding the project was in proportion to the length of the line in the three countries: Frankfurt: 6.9 km (4 mi), Hesse-Darmstadt: 49.4 km (31 mi) and Baden: 38.8 km (24 mi). All three governments were represented in the management of the Main-Neckar Railway in Darmstadt.

=== Construction ===
The construction of the line began in June 1843 on the Frankfurt section. The management of construction was carried out by municipal chief engineer Remigius Eyssen. On 16 April 1846, the first trial service ran from Darmstadt to Langen. The fare for this trip was 1 guilder and 6 kreuzers for first class, 48 kreuzers for second class, 33 kreuzers for third class and 21 kreuzers for fourth class.

The line was opened for the scheduled traffic in sections:

- 22 June 1846: Langen to Darmstadt and Bensheim
- 16 July 1846: Langen to Mainspitze (Frankfurt) and Sachsenhausen (renamed Lokalbahnhof in 1876)
- First continuous trial run from Frankfurt to Heidelberg on 27 July 1846
- 1 August 1846: Bensheim to the junction with the Heidelberg–Mannheim line, thus completing the line. At first carriages were pushed manually over the temporary bridge at Ladenburg; from 9 October 1846 locomotive-hauled traffic ran over the bridge.
- On 20 November 1851, the rail link to the Main-Weser Railway was opened in Frankfurt, and a year later passenger services opened on the link, making the Main-Neckar line part of a major north-south axis. The rail connection to the Taunus station was built in 1871.

==== Bridges ====
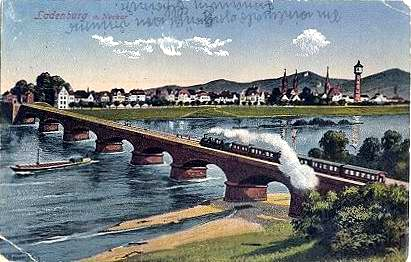
Neckar Bridge at Ladenburg 1900

Until the Main-Neckar Bridge in Frankfurt (at the site of today's Friedensbrücke) was completed on opened to traffic on 15 November 1848, rail services ran into the Mainspitze depot and reversed to the old Sachsenhausen station. After the completion of the bridge over the Main the line ended in Main-Neckar station. The original temporary wooden bridge at Ladenburg was replaced by a stone arch bridge in 1848.

==== Gauges ====
Since the Baden Mainline between Mannheim and Heidelberg was built with a broad gauge of 1600 mm and the Main-Neckar line with standard gauge of 1435 mm, additional track had to be built: from Friedrichsfeld to Heidelberg a second line ran next to the line of the Baden State Railway line. From Friedrichsfeld to Mannheim, the Baden State Railway built an additional standard gauge track at its own expense, although it was operated by the Main-Neckar Railway.

==== Stations ====
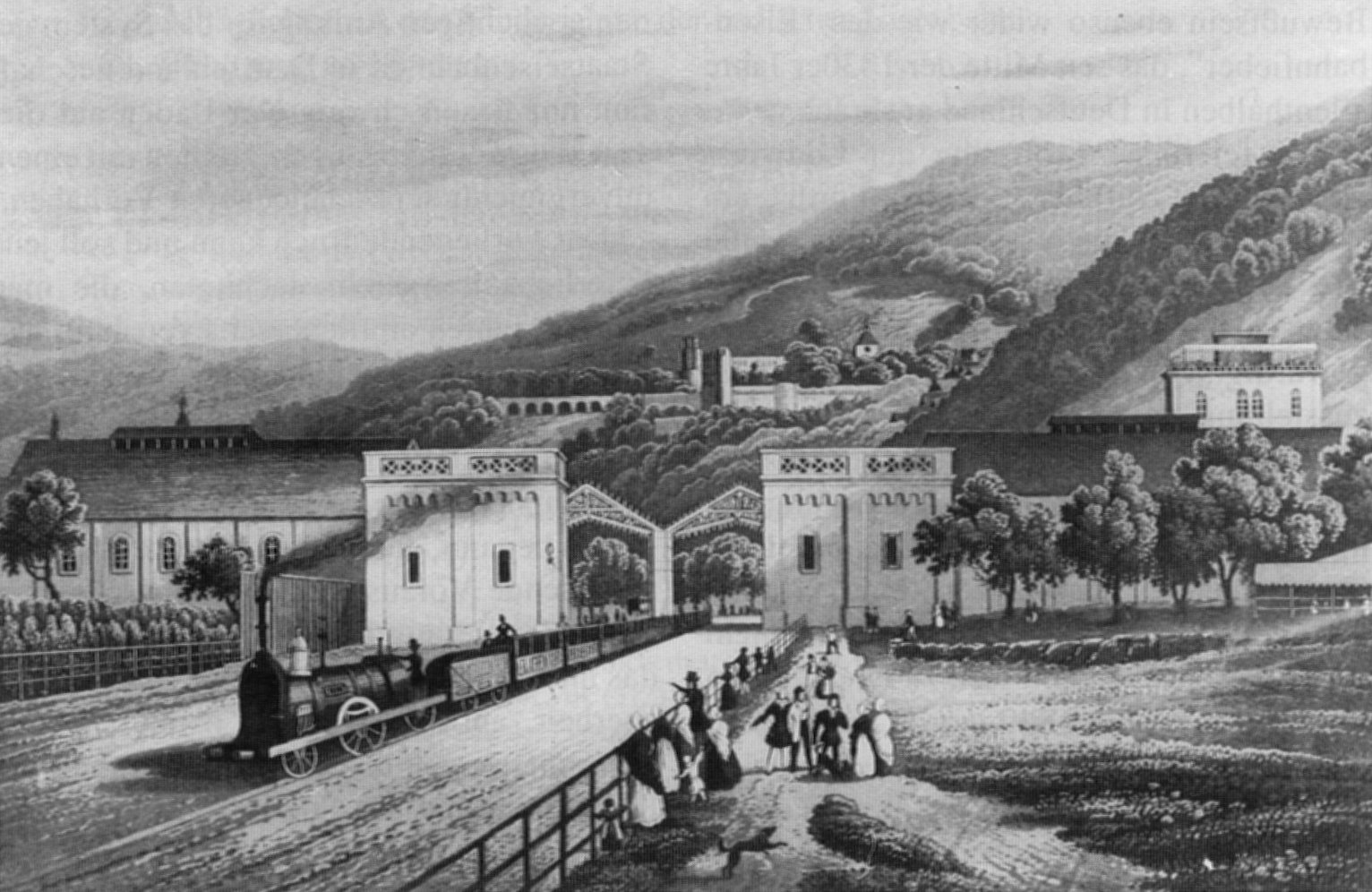
A train leaving the old Heidelberg Station in 1840

The route began in Frankfurt at the Main-Neckar station, one of the three Frankfurt western stations. It was in the (present) Willy-Brandt-Platz on the corner of Münchner Straße and Gallusanlage, south of the Taunus station. It was demolished in 1888. Similarly the old Main-Neckar Darmstadt station was replaced by the current Darmstadt Hauptbahnhof between 1910 and 1912 and the old Heidelberg station, which was opened in May 1848, was replaced by the current Heidelberg Hauptbahnhof in 1955 and demolished in 1960. Each of these stations proved too small for the rapidly growing traffic and were replaced by bigger stations built further from the centre of the towns they serve. The architectural quality of the reception buildings on the line was high. In Bensheim and Heppenheim they were designed by Georg Moller.

=== Operations ===
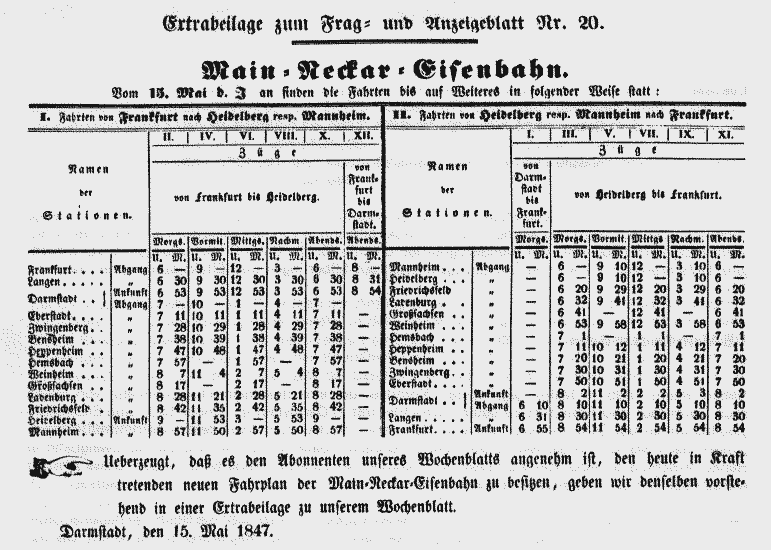
1847 timetable

Initially the railway had 18 locomotives and 252 cars. Twelve locomotives were bought by Hesse-Darmstadt from the Sharp locomotive works of Manchester. The six locomotives purchased of Baden and Frankfurt came from Kesslers Maschinenfabrik in Karlsruhe. All locomotives had a 1A1 wheel arrangement.

On 9 August 1847 freight operations started, with freight carried by mixed trains, until 1848 when separate freight trains proved successful. In the first 15 years of operations, freight volume increased thirty times while the number of passengers carried increased by 50%. The Main-Neckar line was completed and fully open to traffic with the commissioning of the Main-Neckar bridge in Frankfurt on 15 November 1848.

From 18 May 1849 the line was closed to traffic south of Heppenheim as a result of the Baden Revolution and on 6 and 7 June 1849 the line was used exclusively for military transport. Civil operations only resumed on the entire route on 27 June 1849. Operations were also temporarily disrupted in the War of 1866.

=== Economic impact ===
The Main-Neckar Railway brought jobs and income for the people of the Bergstrasse and the western Odenwald. It connected Darmstadt, Mannheim and Frankfurt. Getting a job in the railways, however, was not so simple, many people competed for the jobs available. Only men with impeccable reputation, able to satisfy a thorough examination that they were in perfect health, would be allowed to make the substantial deposit for the coveted dress uniform of railway workers. Somebody who had ruined his health, for example, in the construction of the railway, had no chance.

=== Development of the Main-Neckar Railway ===
In the following years, the line was constantly developed, modernised and adapted to increasing traffic and the changing needs of passengers.

- In 1852, the first pointer telegraph (Zeigertelegraf) was introduced.
- In 1853, fourth class (standing room only) was abolished.
- In 1855, the Baden State Railway was converted to standard gauge and through coaches were introduced from Frankfurt to Kehl, with connection to Basel.
- In 1860, glass windows were installed in third class carriages.
- In 1861, duplication of the line commenced with the line fully duplicated in 1862.
- In 1866, the Prussian government took over Frankfurt's share in the railway, following the annexation of the Free City of Frankfurt by Prussia as a result of the Austro-Prussian War.
- In 1868, electric alarm bells were installed.
- In 1875, steam heating was introduced in carriages.
- In 1877, the first sleeping cars ran from Frankfurt to Basel.
- In 1878, the first Morse telegraph was established.

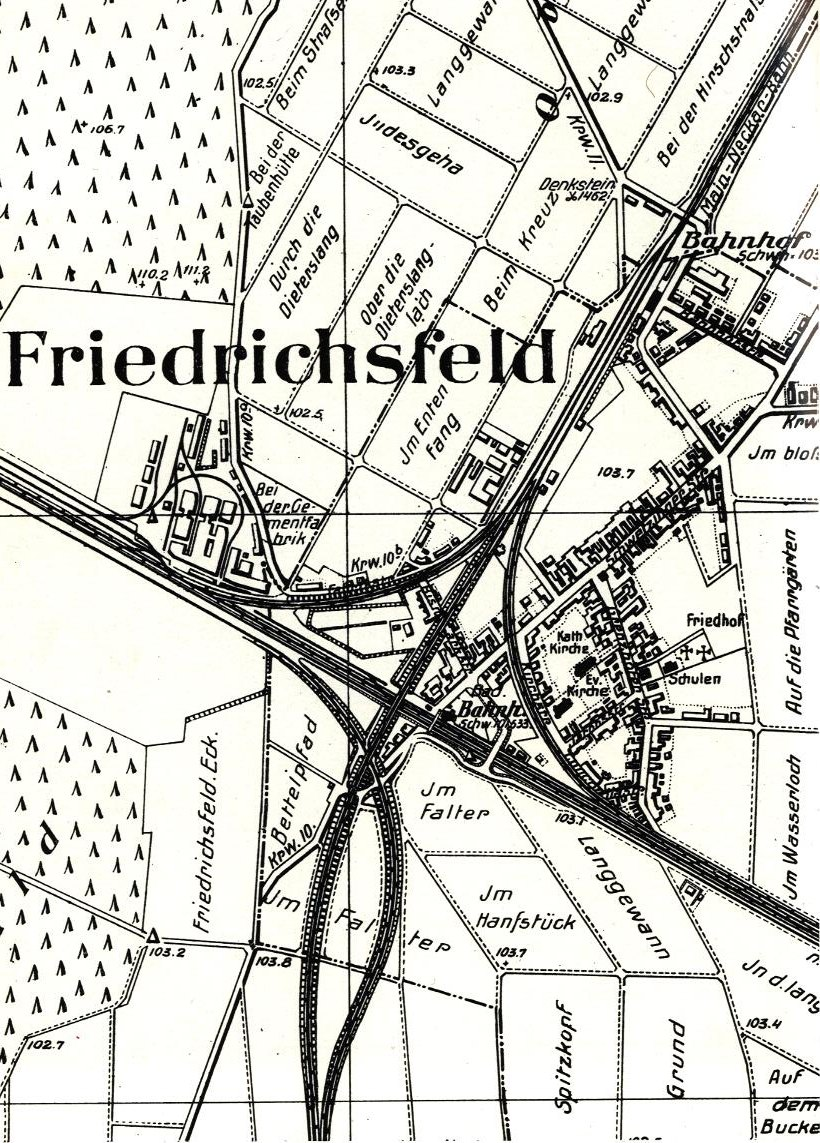
Friedrichsfeld junction in 1900

- On 1 June 1880, a direct link from Mannheim-Friedrichsfeld to Schwetzingen on the Rhine Railway opened.
- In 1882, a four-track steel truss Main-Neckar bridge in Frankfurt was completed about 1000 m west of the first Main-Neckar Bridge. The new bridge was needed so that the Main-Neckar railway could connect with the new Frankfurt Hauptbahnhof. A new line was built from Louisa station on an S-curve on an embankment to the new bridge. In the same year, the connection through the Gotthard opened, making the Main-Neckar line part of an important north-south axis.
- In 1888, after the completion of the new Frankfurt Hauptbahnhof, the line no longer used the old Main-Neckar bridge, which was converted into a road bridge. Mainspitze station was abandoned.
- In 1888, trains began to run on the right-hand line.
- In 1889, Westinghouse air brakes were introduced.
- In 1896, the shares in the company owned by Prussia and Hesse-Darmstadt were transferred to the newly established Prussian-Hessian Railway Company.
- In 1902, the joint management of the railway administration was resolved in a treaty signed by Prussia, Hesse-Darmstadt and Baden. The section of the line in Baden became part of the Baden State Railways; the line in Hesse was transferred to the Railway headquarters of the Kingdom of Prussia and the Grand Duchy of Hesse in Mainz (Königlich Preußischen und Großherzoglich Hessischen Eisenbahndirektion Mainz). Thus the history of the Main-Neckar Railway as an independent company came to an end.

=== Subsequent history ===
- In 1912, the Darmstadt Hauptbahnhof replaced the old and congested stations of the Main-Neckar Railway and the Hessian Ludwig Railway opened. Its architect was Friedrich Pützer.
- In 1927, the Main-Neckar bridge in Frankfurt was replaced by a new, stronger steel truss bridge. This was done during operations with only minor restrictions on the rail and ship transport.
- In 1945, in the last days of World War II the Main-Neckar bridge was blown up by the German Army.
- From 23 November 1946, steam trains began to run on the repaired bridge.
- In 1956, the first section of the railway from Heidelberg to Mannheim-Friedrichsfeld was electrified and went into operation on 3 June. On 1 October 1957, electric operations commenced on the section from Mannheim-Friedrich via Weinheim to Darmstadt. On 19 November 1957, this was followed by operations on the section to Frankfurt.
- In 1997, the southern sections of lines S3 and S4 of the Rhine-Main S-Bahn was completed on the Main-Neckar line. It has since been rebuilt as four tracks between Frankfurt and Langen and between Egelsbach and Erzhausen, expanded to three tracks between Langen and Egelsbach and between Erzhausen and Darmstadt. The stations along this route have been renovated substantially, and platforms have been removed from the mainline tracks except at Langen and Neu-Isenburg. The station buildings, with the exception of Arheilgen and Egelsbach station all still exist and still show traces of the "old" Main-Neckar Railway style.
- On 15 December 2024 the Rhine-Main S-Bahn network was reorganised. Instead of S3 and S4, line S6 now runs on the Main-Neckar line, with train every 15 minutes as far as Langen, continuing every 30 minutes to Darmstadt.

== Current Situation ==
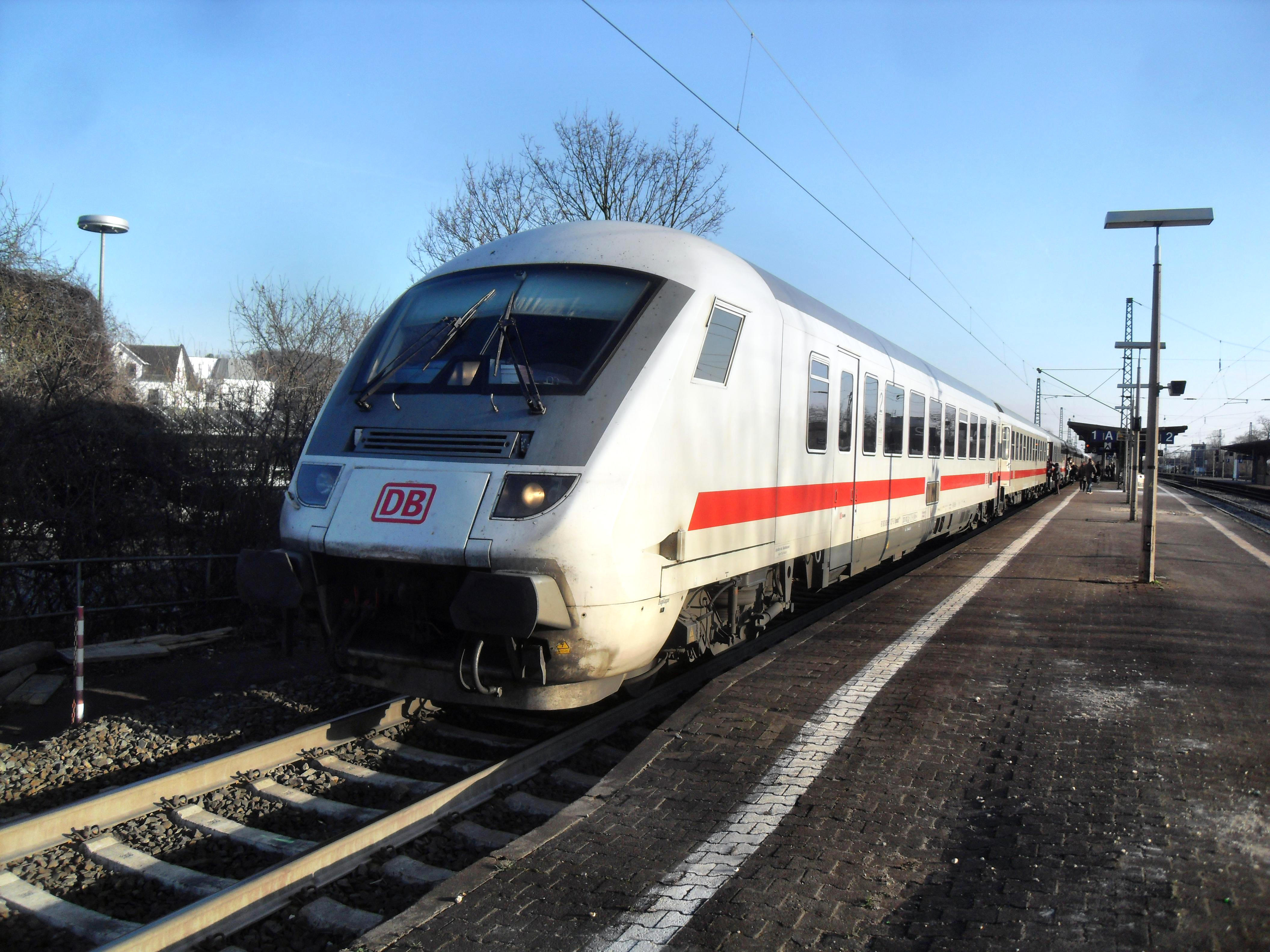
InterCity train from Frankfurt

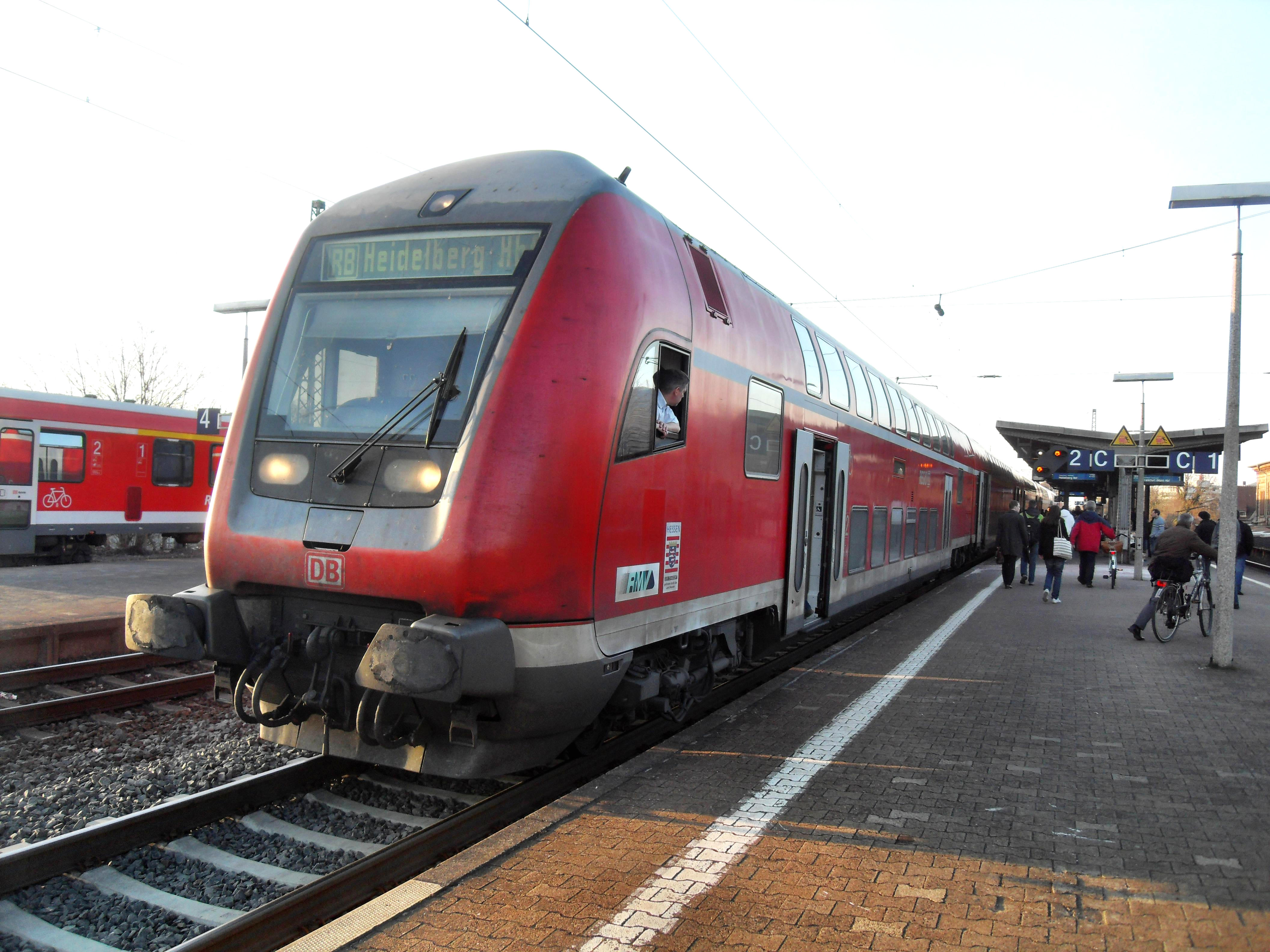
Regionalbahn train in Bensheim station going to Heidelberg

=== Long-distance traffic ===
Today, the Main-Neckar line shares the load of north-south traffic with the Mannheim–Frankfurt railway, which runs further to the west in the Rhine valley, from Frankfurt, bypassing Darmstadt, via Groß-Gerau to Mannheim and Worms. On the section between Darmstadt and Mannheim/Heidelberg, the Main-Neckar Railway has reached the limit of its capacity: 250 trains run on the line in each direction every day. Between Frankfurt and Darmstadt, where the line has three or four tracks, the line is used by the Rhine-Main S-Bahn. This will be relieved by the proposed Frankfurt–Mannheim high-speed railway between Frankfurt Airport and Mannheim, which will take a portion of the high-speed and long-distance trains. Construction is expected to start in 2011 and be completed in 2017.

The Main-Neckar railway bridge line is an important route for north-south traffic, especially freight traffic between the North Sea ports and southern Germany and Switzerland. The bridge is used by 600 trains each day, including trains operating over the Frankfurt–Bebra and Frankfurt-Hanau lines.

=== Regional services ===
Regional-Express trains stop only in Frankfurt, Langen, Darmstadt, Bickenbach, Bensheim, Heppenheim, Hemsbach, Weinheim and Ladenburg. Regionalbahn trains stop between Frankfurt and Darmstadt only in Langen, then stop at all stations. Lützelsachsen and Großsachsen-Heddesheim stations are served every two hours only. Stations between Frankfurt and Darmstadt via Frankfurt South are served by S-Bahn line S6.

- Friedberg (Hess) – Frankfurt Hbf – Citytunnel – South station – Langen (– Darmstadt)
- RE 60 Frankfurt – Darmstadt – Bensheim – Weinheim – Mannheim (Regional-Express)
- RB 67 Bensheim – Weinheim – Mannheim (Regionalbahn)
- RB 68 Frankfurt – Darmstadt – Bensheim – Weinheim – Heidelberg (Regionalbahn)

== Sources ==
=== References ===
- Eisenbahnatlas Deutschland (German railway atlas) (2007/2008 ed.). Schweers + Wall. 2007. ISBN 978-3-89494-136-9.
- Hager, Bernhard (2004). "Aus der Geschichte der Main-Neckar-Bahn (History of the Main-Neckar Railway". Jahrbuch für Eisenbahngeschichte (Yearbook of rail history) (in German). Vol. 36. pp. 5–32.
- Landesamt für Denkmalpflege Hessen (State Conservation Hesse), ed. (2005). Eisenbahn in Hessen. Kulturdenkmäler in Hessen. Denkmaltopographie Bundesrepublik Deutschland (Railways in Hesse. Cultural sites in Hesse. Monumental topography of the Federal Republic of Germany) (in German). Vol. 2. Stuttgart: Theiss Verlag. pp. 50ff. ISBN 3-8062-1917-6. Line 002
- Paetz, Fritz (1985). Datensammlung zur Geschichte der Eisenbahnen an Main, Rhein und Neckar (Data collection for the history of railways in Main, Rhine and Neckar) (in German). Bensheim-Auerbach.
- Schreyer, Ferdinand (1996). Geschichte der Main-Neckar-Bahn 1846-1896, Denkschrift zum 50. Jahrestag 1896. (History of the Main-Neckar Railway 1846-1896, memorandum on the 50th anniversary, 1896) (in German) (Reprint ed.).
