= Worms–Rosengarten train ferry =

Worms-Rosengarten Train Ferry

Overview
- Locale: Hesse and Rhineland-Palatinate, Germany

History
- Opened: 1870
- Closed: 1901

Technical
- Line length: 11 km (6.8 mi)

The Worms–Rosengarten train ferry was a train ferry that operated from 1870 to 1900 between Rosengarten station, a former station on the eastern bank of the Rhine opposite Worms, and the city of Worms.

== History ==
The Main-Neckar Railway opened its railway on the eastern side of the Rhine from Heidelberg to Frankfurt via Darmstadt in 1846. In 1853, the Hessian Ludwig Railway opened its line on the west bank from Mainz to Worms, connecting in Ludwigshafen with the Palatine Ludwig Railway Company's line to Kaiserslautern and Bexbach. The first rail link in Mainz between the two sides of the Rhine was built in 1858 on the Rhine-Main Railway to Darmstadt, the capital of Grand Duchy of Hesse. This initially used a train ferry, which was replaced in 1862 by the South Bridge. To the south of Worms, the stations of Ludwigshafen and Mannheim were connected by a train ferry in 1863, which was replaced by a fixed bridge in 1867.

== Construction of the project ==
To close the approximately 66-kilometre gap between these Rhine crossings, a concession was issued to the Hessian Ludwig Railway for the construction of the Darmstadt–Worms railway (known as the Riedbahn) on 28 February 1868. It ran originally from Darmstadt, via Gernsheim, Biblis, Hofheim and Rosengarten to Worms. A branch from Frankfurt (also known as the Riedbahn and now part of the Mannheim–Frankfurt railway) was opened in 1879. The construction cost of the line was estimated at 1 million Vereinsthalers. While the railway was to be completed by August 1871, no date was set for the construction of the bridge over the Rhine, as the railway company lacked sufficient funds. Therefore, a ferry would be installed to provide the initial connection across the Rhine.

The line from Darmstadt to Rosengarten was opened on 1 June 1869. On the eastern side of the Rhine, the Nibelung Railway was opened from Bensheim to Hofheim on the Mannheim–Frankfurt railway on 1 November 1869. The west bank line from the Rhine to Worms Hauptbahnhof was opened together with the ferry operation on 12 August 1870. The opening of the Rosengarten–Lampertheim line followed on 15 October 1877.

== Ferry operations ==
At first only the paddle steamer Ludwigsbahn I and three barges were available. The Ludwigsbahn I was built specifically for ferry traffic at the shipyard in Duisburg-Ruhrort in 1869. While passengers used the steamer as a ferry and boarded a stationary train on the other side, freight wagons were loaded onto the barges. This had a device on the bow to connect the tracks on the ferry with the track on land. The ferry could accommodate three wagons. The barges were coupled alongside the steamer for the crossing. It was not necessary to support the track from the shore to the barge with piers; loading involved a sharp bend in the track that could be handled only by two-axle wagons, which were usual for freight wagons at the time. The ferry operations had to be suspended at extremely low water levels.

The ferry was very important for freight traffic. It carried 39,537 wagons in 1886. On average, it carried 108 wagons each day. It could transfer a maximum of 150 wagons per day. Three steamers and three barges were available for this traffic.

Passenger traffic on the ferry was high. Two pairs of trains ran to Rosengarten each day in 1880 and there were 15 pairs in 1897. The time between the train arriving on one bank and departing on the other bank is shown as seven minutes in the timetables. The elaborate ferry operations of the Hessian Ludwig Railway was financed by a fare surcharge equivalent to an additional 8.4 kilometres. This meant that a passenger who wanted to travel from Worms to Bensheim had to pay the fare for a 32.5 km for a 24.1 km long route. Similalr fare regulations at that time applied in some other cases, for example, in relation to the pontoon bridge in Speyer and the Wesel Railway Bridge.

As part of the straightening of the Rhine between 1817 and 1876 and as a result of military considerations, the planning of a bridge over the Rhine at Worms was undertaken from 1890. A new line on the west bank connected Worms to the new Rhine Bridge at Hofheim, which was opened on 1 December 1900. This enabled the uninterrupted movement of trains and allowed the ferry to be closed immediately.
