= Rhine Bridge (Worms) =

Worms Rhine Bridge Rheinbrücke Worms
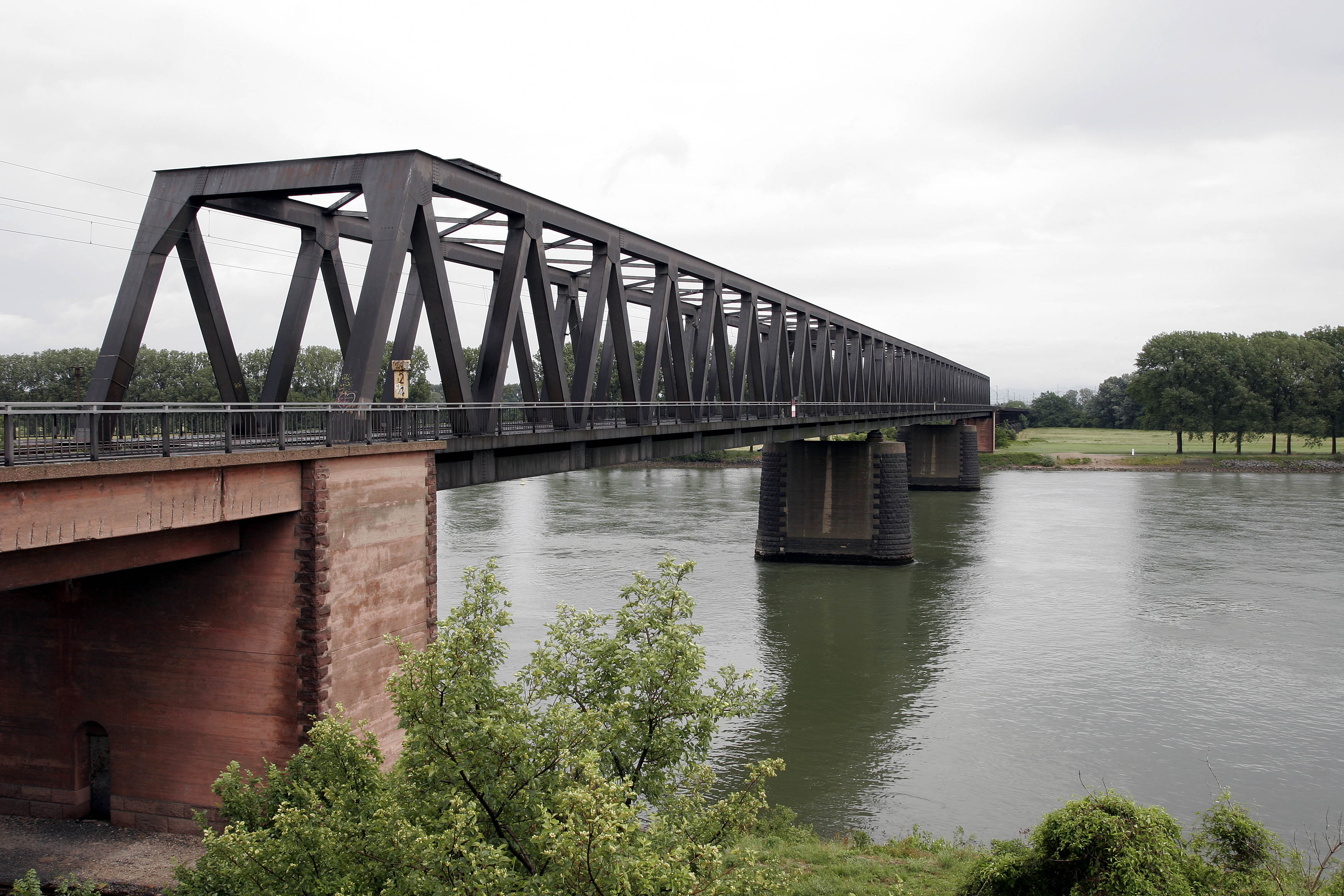
- Current bridge, looking towards the eastern bank of the Rhine
- Coordinates: 49°39′2″N 8°22′23″E
- Carries: Worms–Biblis railway
- Crosses: Rhine
- Locale: Worms, Germany

Characteristics
- Design: Steel truss bridge
- Total length: 930 m
- Longest span: 118.3 m

History
- Opened: 30 November 1900
- Rebuilt: 15 October 1948; 29 May 1960

The Worms Rhine Bridge (German: Rheinbrücke Worms) is a two-track railway bridge that spans the Rhine river to the north of Worms, Germany, forming part of the Worms–Biblis railway.

== 1900 bridge ==
Already in 1868, the Hessian Ludwig Railway was obliged, under its concession for the Darmstadt-Worms line, to build a bridge over the Rhine as soon as its finances allowed. From 1870 to 1901, rail traffic used the Worms–Rosengarten train ferry, a ferry between the port of Worms and Rosengarten on the eastern side of the Rhine.

An agreement was signed in 1894 by the city, the government of the Grand Duchy of Hesse and the railway company for the construction of the Rhine bridge as part of the reconstruction of Worms station. The construction was first announced in 1896, but the start of construction was delayed until mid 1898, due to the nationalisation of the Hessian Ludwig Railway Company in 1897. All of the construction of the 961 metre-long structure was carried out by the Actiengesellschaft für Eisenindustrie und Brückenbau, a subsidiary of the Duisburg company, Johann Caspar Harkort. Its submission, prepared in conjunction with Aachen Professor Georg Frentzen, had won the first prize in a design competition.

A two-track iron bridge with three, tied-arch spans was built over the Rhine, with the outside spans being 102.2 m long and the central span being 116.8 m long. This type of construction was applied in Germany for the first time on a railway bridge and was later used for other rail bridges, such as the Cologne South Bridge. The bridge was framed by two massive gate towers. The east bank flood bridge had separate structures for each track, each with 17 34.5 m-long spans. These were built as truss bridges with the railway tracks running above parallel girders connected by timber framing.

The river piers were based on 156 m² caissons, the other piers were built on concrete foundations between retaining walls. The bridge was opened after two years and six months of construction on 30 November 1900 in the presence of Grand Duke Ernest Louis.

Due to the increasing weight of trains, the bridge decks were reinforced and a continuous ballast bed was installed in 1931-1932. Towards the end of the Second World War, the Rhine bridge was blown up by German troops on 20 March 1945. The electrical infrastructure and two flood bridges were also destroyed.

== 1948 bridge ==
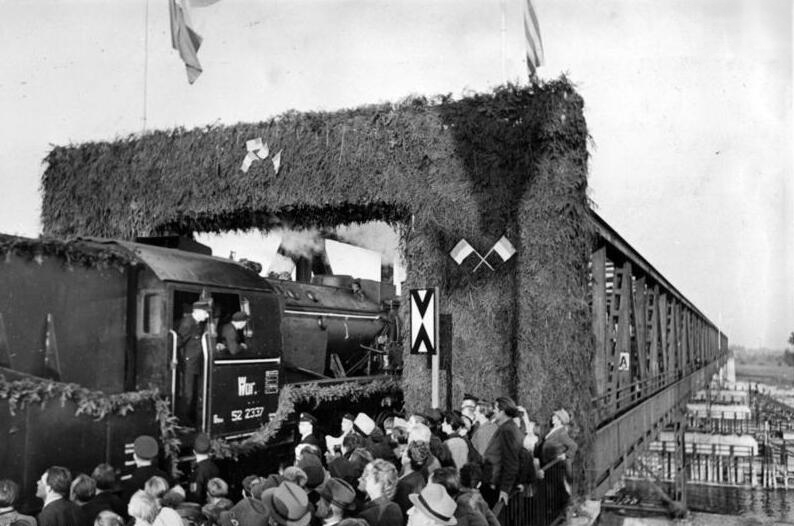
Commissioning in October 1948

In 1946, work began at the direction of the French military government for the design, the construction of a temporary bridge. A combined single-track railway and road bridge was built parallel to the old bridge and 28 m upstream of it. The main stream was crossed by six spans of twin braced trusses with the railway running on the lower truss. The main span, which was closest to the Worms bank, had a length of 48.6 m and the remaining five spans had a total length of 61.2 m. The general clearance of the spans was 7.42 m, while the clearance of the main span was 7.5 m. The superstructure was supported on truss piers built on pile caps on top of steel piles. Part of the approach bridge was rebuilt to connect with the new bridge. It was composed of eight spans, each 24.0 m long. The superstructure consisted of a 1.7 m-thick plate girder beneath the tracks. The bridge was opened on 15 October 1948. After the completion of the Nibelung Bridge (Nibelungenbrücke) for road traffic in 1953, the bridge was used only by the railway.

== 1960 bridge ==
In the mid-1950s, plans were prepared for the final reconstruction of the railway bridge over the Rhine at Worms. A three-span, pylon-less braced-truss bridge made of steel with a continuous beam was built on the axis of the old route and on the old foundations. The spans have a total length of 327.1 m with the outer spans being 104.4 m-long and the central spans being 118.3 m-long. The framework has parallel struts with a total height of 9.0 m and the tracks on the lower beam. The 17-span flood bridge on the eastern bank is similar to the reconstructed parts of the pre-war bridge, with parallel trusses built with timber framing and the tracks carried on the upper truss and piers at intervals of 35.25 m.

The section of line that includes the new bridge was opened on 29 May 1960. It was electrified in 1964.

== Reconstruction of the eastern approach bridge in 2012 ==
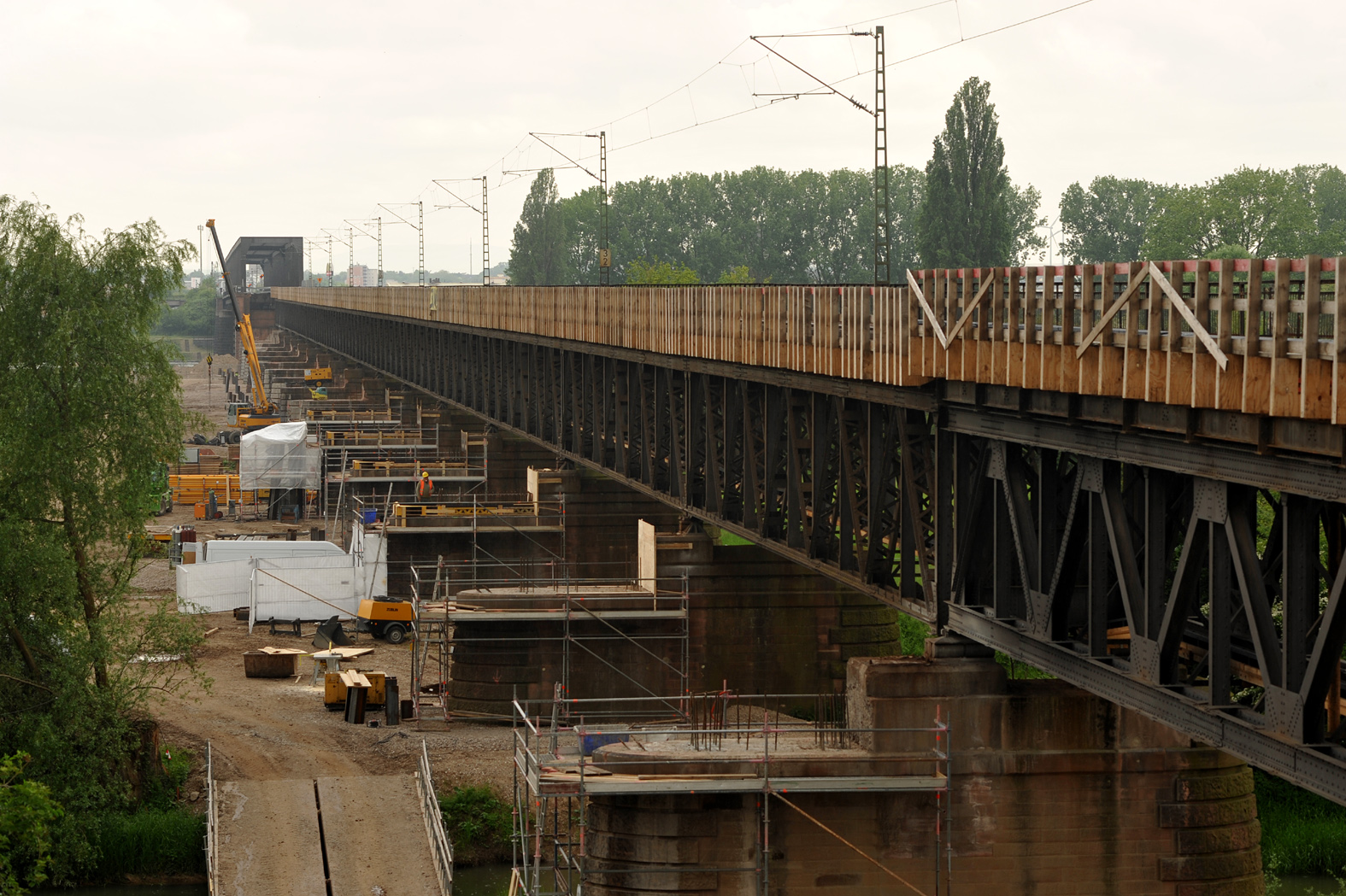
Construction in 2010

The superstructure of the flood bridge on the eastern bank, which was still largely in its original form as built in 1900, was replaced by a new superstructure with a ballast trackbed from 2009 to 2012. It consists of a two-track composite construction with two parallel beams connected by diagonal steel girders and a deck made of a concrete slab.

The structural system is a 603.7 m-long continuous beam with an overall height of 5.0 m. The 17 piers have been preserved. The longitudinal forces, including from braking and accelerating, are transferred to the ground at the eastern abutment, which forms the new fixed-point of the bridge. Therefore, the abutment was replaced by a new structure built on piles. In the west, the bridge connects with the Rhine bridge. The track has an expansion joint that allows for longitudinal movements of up to 700 mm.

In order to maintain the movement of railway traffic over at least one track throughout the construction period, the new approach bridge was first built in a position lying parallel with the old track, including ballast, track and catenary. Subsequently, the entire 17,000-ton structure was moved and inserted in place in July 2011 and a further 4.5 m section was inserted on 18 January 2012. Two tracks were again available for tracks on the section, including the bridge over the Rhine, from 2 April 2012.

== Worms Brücke station ==
On the west bank flood bridge immediately next to the Worms bridge is Worms Brücke (Worms Bridge) station, which formerly served the Worms-Nord industrial area. Passenger services have no longer stopped there since 14 December 2014 due to low patronage. It was last served by trains on the Nibelung Railway.
