= Hofheim (Ried) station =

Railway station in Germany

Hofheim (Ried)
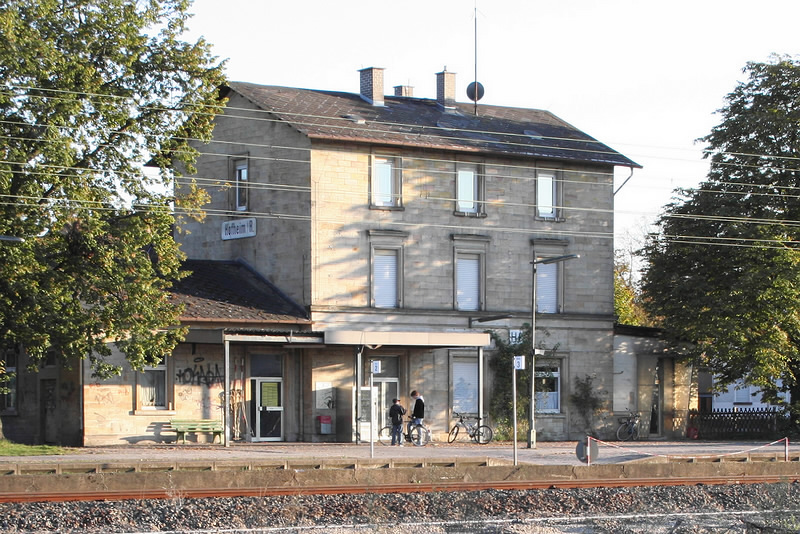
- 2005

General information
- Location: Bahnhofstraße 2; 68623 Hofheim; Hesse; Germany
- Coordinates: 49.6593°N 8.4092°E
- System: Bf
- Owner: Deutsche Bahn
- Operator: DB Station&Service
- Lines: Darmstadt–Worms railway (KBS 655); Nibelung Railway (KBS 653)
- Platforms: 2 side platforms
- Tracks: 2
- Train operators: DB Regio Mitte
- Connections: RB 62RB 63; 601 642 645 646 647

Construction
- Parking: yes
- Cycle facilities: yes
- Accessible: yes

Other information
- Station code: 2826
- DS100 code: FHOR
- IBNR: 8002934
- Category: 6
- Fare zone: VRN: 34 and 43; : 4701 (VRN transitional tariff)
- Website: www.bahnhof.de

Services
Preceding station	DB Regio Mitte	Following station
Worms Hbf Terminus	RB 62	Biblis Terminus
Worms Hbf Terminus	RB 63	Bürstadt towards Bensheim
Location
- Location within Hesse Location within Germany Location within Europe

Hofheim (Ried) station (German: Bahnhof Hofheim (Ried)) is a railway station in the municipality of Hofheim, located in the Bergstraße district in Hesse, Germany.
