= Biblis station =

Railway station in Biblis, Germany

Biblis
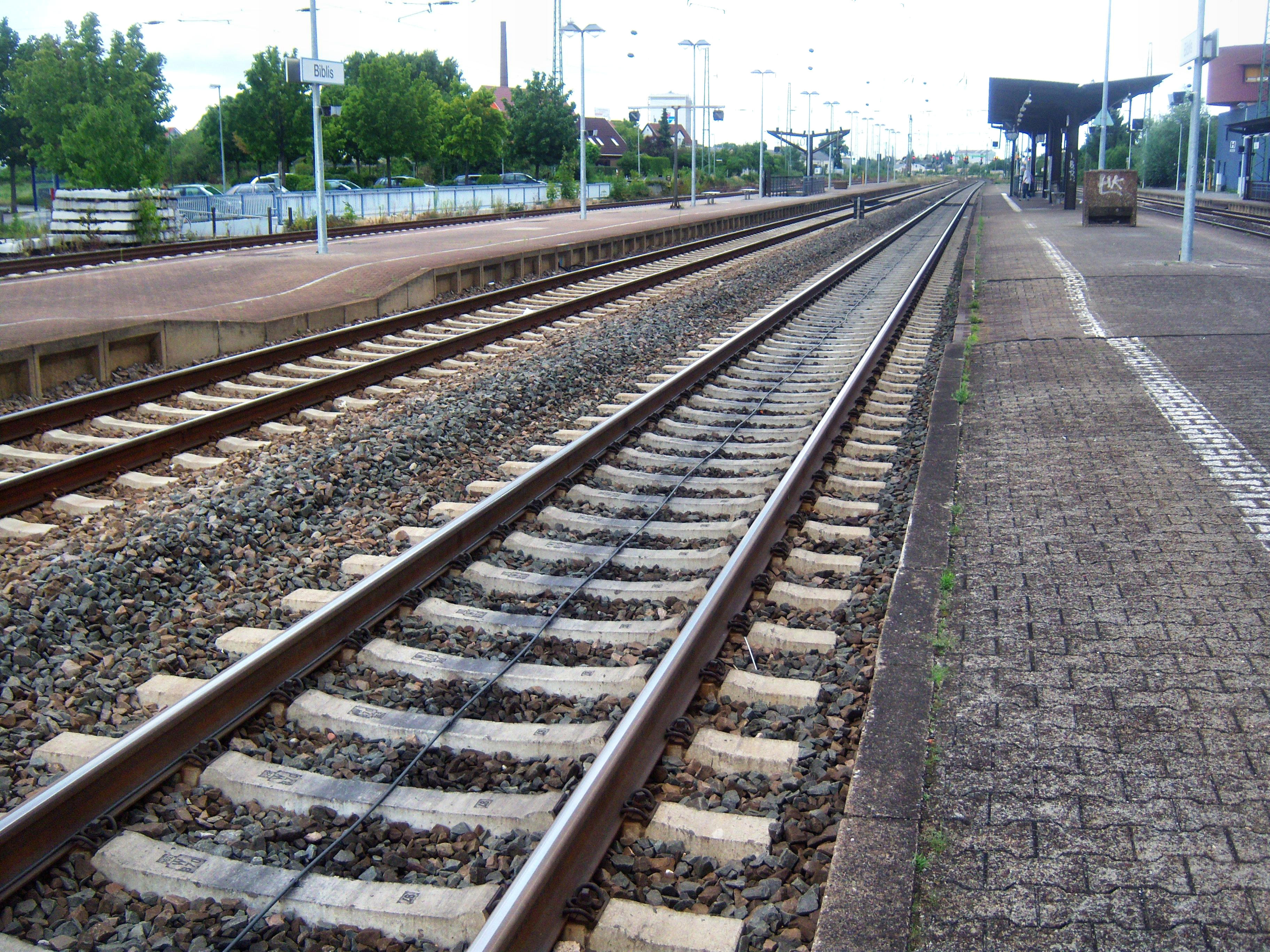
- Biblis station, track 3 towards Frankfurt

General information
- Location: Biblis, Hesse; Germany
- Coordinates: 49°41′21″N 8°27′02″E
- Lines: Mannheim–Frankfurt (KBS 655; Worms–Biblis (KBS 655)
- Platforms: 5

Construction
- Accessible: Yes

Other information
- Station code: 614
- DS100 code: FBL
- IBNR: 8000503
- Category: 4
- Fare zone: VRN: 14; : 4701 (VRN transitional tariff)
- Website: www.bahnhof.de

History
- Opened: 1 June 1869

Services
Preceding station	DB Regio Mitte	Following station
Bürstadt towards Frankfurt (Main) Hbf	RE 70	Groß Rohrheim towards Mannheim Hbf
Hofheim (Ried) towards Worms Hbf	RB 62	Terminus
Preceding station	Rhine-Neckar S-Bahn	Following station
Terminus	S8	Bobstadt towards Mannheim Hbf
Location
- Location within Hesse Location within Germany Location within Europe

Biblis station is the only station of the town of Biblis in the German state of Hesse. It is classified by Deutsche Bahn as a category 4 station. The station is located on the Mannheim–Frankfurt railway, where the Worms–Biblis railway branches off to Worms. Both lines developed from the Riedbahn (Ried Railway).

== History ==
On 29 May 1869 the line from Darmstadt via Riedstadt-Goddelau and Biblis to the Rosengarten station, on the opposite side of the Rhine to Worms, was opened by the Prime Minister of the Grand Duchy of Hesse, Reinhard Carl Friedrich von Dalwigk. From Rosengarten station, trains crossed the Rhine from 1870 to 1900 using the Worms-Rosengarten train ferry, as there was no bridge across the Rhine at Worms.

In October 1879 the line was extended via Waldhof to Mannheim Neckarstadt where it ended not at Mannheim Hauptbahnhof, but at the Riedbahnhof (Ried Railway station), north of the present Kurpfalz bridge. Since November 1879 trains have run on the Ried Railway through Biblis from Worms to Frankfurt (branching off at Riedstadt-Goddelau) and since 1880 from Mannheim Hauptbahnhof to Frankfurt.

== Operations ==
With 650 trains per day (as of 2007) the Ried Railway is one of the most congested railway lines in Germany. By 2015 a further increase to 900 trains is expected. The line carries three Intercity-Express lines, connecting southern Germany with Berlin, Hamburg and Cologne/Dortmund. However, only regional trains stop at Biblis station.

Regional services on the next Ried Railway are organised by the Rhein-Main-Verkehrsverbund (RMV) and the Verkehrsverbund Rhein-Neckar (VRN). Biblis station is served by Regional-Express service RE 70 between Mannheim and Frankfurt. Regionalbahn service RB 62 operate to Worms, connecting with Regional-Express services to Mannheim and to Frankfurt. Regionalbahn trains to Mannheim and Karlsruhe are expected to be replaced by Rhine-Neckar S-Bahn services.
