= Prussian-Hessian Railway Company =

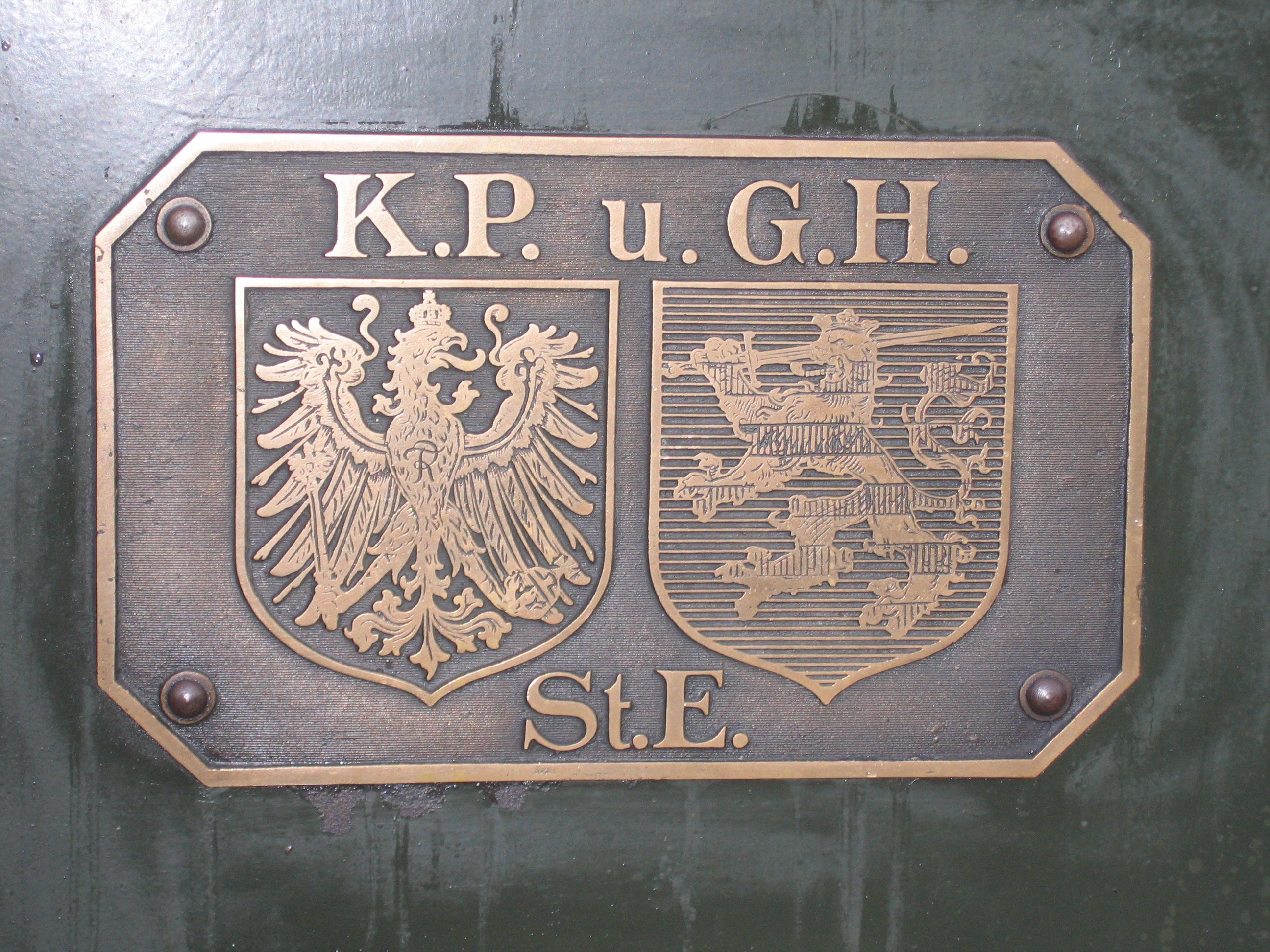
Letters: Königlich Preußische und Großherzoglich Hessische Staats-Eisenbahn (Royal Prussian and Grand-Ducal Hessian State Railways); left: Prussian arms; right: Hessian arms.

The Royal Prussian and Grand-Ducal Hessian State Railways (German: Königlich Preußische und Großherzoglich Hessische Staatseisenbahnen or K.P.u.G.H.St.E.) was a state-owned network of independent railway divisions in the German states of Prussia and Hesse in the early 20th century. It was not, as sometimes maintained, a single state railway company.

On 1 April 1897, the management of the Royal Prussian State Railways (Königlich Preußische Staatseisenbahnen) took over the operations of the railways within the Grand Duchy of Hesse under the initial name "Prussian-Hessian Railway Operation and Financial Association" (Preußisch-Hessische Eisenbahnbetriebs- und Finanzgemeinschaft). Ownership, sovereign rights, and profits remained with the state of Hesse in accordance with a state treaty of 23 June 1896. The headquarters of the railway division (Eisenbahndirektion) was at Mainz.

Hesse could also influence the selection of staff for managerial posts, but engineering and operating procedures followed Prussian regulations alone. All staff wore the Prussian uniform, although the Hessians were allowed to wear a Hessian insignia in addition.

The reason for this agreement was firstly the geographical situation of the state of Hesse — divided into two regions and tightly interlocked with areas of Prussia — and secondly the aim of both states to nationalize the last big private railway company, the Hessian Ludwig Railway (Hessische Ludwigsbahn). With 486,318 employees in 1907, Prussian-Hessian Railways was the largest company in the German Empire. The Prussian-Hessian Railway Company was renamed following World War I to the Prussian State Railway, but was absorbed in 1920 with other German state railways (Länderbahnen) into the Deutsche Reichsbahn.

== See also ==
- History of rail transport in Germany
- Prussian state railways

== Literature ==
- M. Biermer: Die preußisch-hessische Eisenbahngemeinschaft = Sammlung nationalökonomischer Aufsätze und Vorträge in zwangloser Reihenfolge 2, Heft 8. Gießen, 1911.
- Großherzogliches Ministerium der Finanzen (publ.): Die hessischen Eisenbahnen in der Preußisch-Hessischen Eisenbahn-Betriebs- und Finanz-Gemeinschaft vom 1. April 1897 bis zum 31. März 1907 (Denkschrift) = Parlamentsdrucksache No. 732 for the 23rd Landtag 1905–1908 of the Grand Duchy of Hesse, Second Chamber. Darmstadt, 1908.
- Hager, Bernhard (2008). "Aufsaugung durch Preußen" oder "Wohltat für Hessen"? Die preußisch-hessische Eisenbahngemeinschaft von 1896/97. In Andreas Hedwig (ed.): "Auf eisernen Schienen, so schnell wie der Blitz". Regionale und überregionale Aspekte der Eisenbahngeschichte (Schriften des hessischen Staatsarchivs Marburg. Vol. 19). Hessian State Archives, Marburg, ISBN 978-3-88964-196-0, pp. 81–111.
