= Darmstadt–Worms railway =

Railway line in Germany

Overview
- Line number: 3541 (Darmstadt–Goddelau); 4010 (Goddelau–Biblis); 3570 (Biblis–Worms)
- Locale: Hesse, Rhineland-Palatinate, Germany
- Termini: Darmstadt; Worms

Service
- Route number: 655

Technical
- Line length: 43.5 km (27.0 mi)
- Track gauge: 1,435 mm (4 ft 8 1/2 in) standard gauge
- Electrification: Goddelau–Worms: 15 kV/16.7 Hz AC overhead catenary

The Darmstadt–Worms railway is a standard-gauge railway that is now partially closed. It runs through southern Hesse through the Hessian Ried (Hessische Ried) and so it is also called the Riedbahn (Ried Railway).

The section between Darmstadt and Riedstadt-Goddelau is now largely closed. The section between Riedstadt-Goddelau and Biblis, which is now considered part of the Mannheim–Frankfurt railway, is of great importance for long-distance passenger services and rail freight traffic. The last section from Biblis to Worms is used by regional passenger services and rail freight traffic.

== History ==
The Darmstadt–Worms railway was originally built by the Hessian Ludwig Railway (Hessische Ludwigsbahn), to connect Darmstadt, the capital of the Grand Duchy of Hesse, with Worms, the second most important city in the province of Rheinhessen of the Grand Duchy. The riparian communities contributed significantly to the financing of the project.

On 29 May 1869, the line from Darmstadt via Riedstadt-Goddelau and Biblis to Rosengarten station, on the opposite side of the Rhine from Worms, was opened by the Prime Minister of the Grand Duchy of Hesse, Reinhard Carl Friedrich von Dalwigk. From Rosengarten station, trains crossed the Rhine from 1870 to 1900 using the Worms-Rosengarten train ferry, as there was no bridge across the Rhine at Worms.

In December 1900, a railway bridge was opened over the Rhine to Worms, creating a direct connection to Worms and replacing the existing terminus at Rosengarten and the ferry crossing over the Rhine.

In 1975, the railway between Darmstadt and Goddelau was closed due to lack of traffic and partly dismantled. All that remains of the line is a siding from Darmstadt to Weiterstadt-Riedbahn, where the line ends.

== Operations ==
=== Darmstadt–Riedstadt-Goddelau ===
A siding to the industrial area of Weiterstadt-Riedbahn still exists on the largely disused section between Darmstadt Hauptbahnhof and Riedstadt-Goddelau and it is occasionally used by freight traffic.

=== Riedstadt-Goddelau–Biblis ===
Almost all Intercity-Express and InterCity trains between the Frankfurt railway node in the north (the stations of Frankfurt (Main) Hauptbahnhof, Frankfurt South station and Frankfurt Airport) and Mannheim Hauptbahnhof in the south run on the middle section between Riedstadt-Goddelau and Biblis.

In addition, the RE 70, a Regional-Express service, runs from Frankfurt via Groß Gerau-Dornberg, Riedstadt-Goddelau, Biblis and Lampertheim to Mannheim.

=== Biblis–Worms ===
The southern section is operated only by two Regionalbahn services: RB 62 from Biblis to Worms Hbf and RB 63 on the route from Hofheim (Ried) to Worms Hbf (originating in Bürstadt and Bensheim, see also Nibelung Railway).
