= Heinrich Gerber (civil engineer) =

German civil engineer and inventor

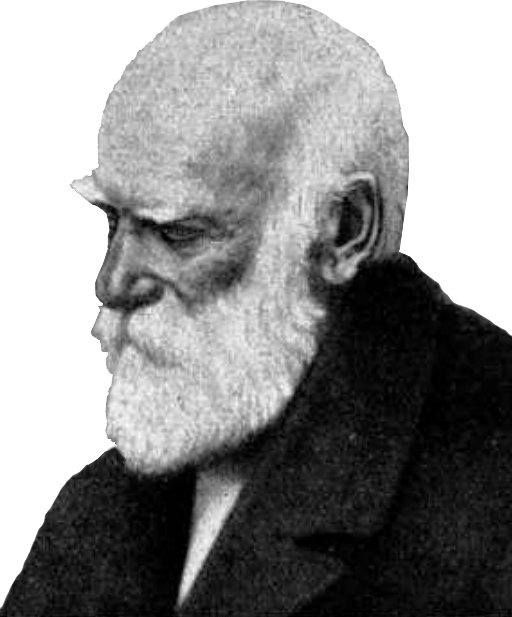
- Born: November 18, 1832; Hof, Bavaria
- Died: January 3, 1912 (aged 79); Munich, Germany
- Occupation: Civil engineer

Heinrich Gerber (Johann Gottfried Heinrich Gerber; November 18, 1832 in Hof, Bavaria – January 3, 1912 in Munich, Germany) was a German civil engineer and inventor of the Gerber girder. He received several patents for his systems for building bridges.

== Background ==
Example of a Gerber girder bridge

Gerber studied at the Polytechnic schools in Nuremberg and Munich, and in 1852 he joined the Bavarian Staatsbaudienst, where he worked on the railways. He assisted in the design of the Großhesseloher bridge and helped to develop the Pauli girder used in the bridge. After its completion in 1857, Gerber was appointed chief engineer of the Maschinenfabrik Klett bridge department in Nuremberg.

When the company in 1859 was awarded the contract for the construction of the railway bridge over the Rhine at Mainz he decided to manufacture the bridge parts in a temporary facility near the site in Gustavsburg. Gerber moved in 1860 with his family to the assembling site in order to manage the manufacture and construction of the bridge until its completion in 1863.

In his subsequent time in Nuremberg, he was working on continuous structural systems, which could be calculated more easily. In 1866 he was awarded the Bavarian patent ″Balkenträger mit freiliegenden Stützpunkten″ (girder with exposed bases). This cantilever bridge system was first realized in 1867 at a bridge over the Regnitz at Bamberg and in the Main Bridge in Haßfurt. This construction spread rapidly and became known worldwide as Gerber Beam.

1868 Gerber went back to Gustavsburg to manage the construction of the second track of the Rhine bridge. Then he located with an office in Munich. As part of the conversion of the Nuremberg headquarters in Maschinenbau-Actiengesellschaft Nürnberg, in 1873, the plant MAN-Werk Gustavsburg and his Munich office was merged to Süddeutsche Bridge AG in Munich and became independent with Gerber as Chief Executive. During this time he dealt among other things with development work on intersections of truss, the other duties of the executive board were to him less. At his own suggestion, this company was merged in 1884 into the Maschinenbau-Aktiengesellschaft Nürnberg (now MAN). Gerber was a board member there and had a seat in the technical advisory board. He devoted himself to continue his research and consulting activities.

== Sources ==
- Walter Sbrzesny (1964). "Gerber, Johann Gottfried Heinrich". Neue Deutsche Biographie (in German). Vol. 6. Berlin: Duncker & Humblot. p. 255. (full text online).
- Ludwig Freytag, Heinrich Gerber, Altmeister der deutschen Eisenbaukunst. In: Conrad Matschoss (Ed.): Beiträge zur Geschichte der Technik und Industrie. vol 10. Springer, Berlin 1920, ZDB-ID 2238668-3, p. 93–102. – online.
