= Worms Hauptbahnhof =

Railway station in Worms, Germany

Worms Hbf
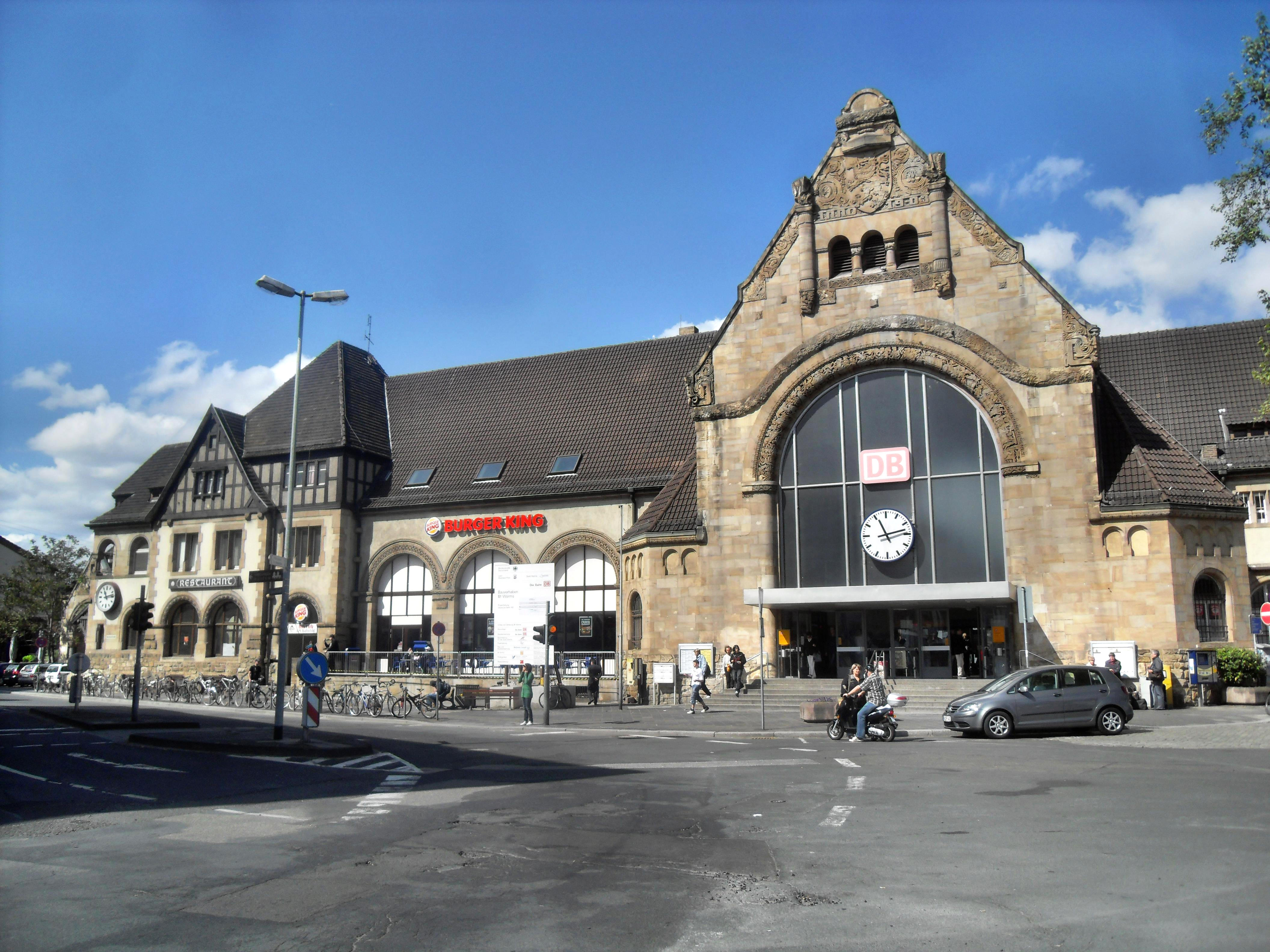
- Worms station from the east

General information
- Location: Bahnhofstr. 7/11,Worms, Rhineland-Palatinate; Germany
- Coordinates: 49°38′5″N 8°21′25″E
- Lines: Mainz–Ludwigshafen (KBS 660); Rheinhessen Railway (KBS 662); Darmstadt–Worms railway (KBS 655); Nibelung Railway (KBS 653)
- Platforms: 8 (1–5, 8, 9, 11)

Construction
- Accessible: Yes
- Architect: Fritz Klingholz
- Architectural style: Romanesque Revival architecture

Other information
- Station code: 6887
- DS100 code: FWOR
- IBNR: 8000257
- Category: 2
- Fare zone: VRN: 43; : 6701 (VRN transitional tariff); RNN: 380 (VRN transitional tariff)
- Website: www.bahnhof.de

History
- Opened: 1904

Passengers
- 10,000
Services
Preceding station	DB Fernverkehr	Following station
Mainz Hbf One-way operation	ICE 11	Mannheim Hbf towards München Hbf
Mainz Hbf towards Frankfurt (Main) Hbf or Münster Hbf	ICE 62	Mannheim Hbf towards Graz Hbf
Preceding station	DB Regio Mitte	Following station
Mainz Hbf towards Frankfurt (Main) Hbf	RE 4	Frankenthal Hbf towards Karlsruhe Hbf
Mainz Hbf towards Frankfurt (Main) Hbf	RE 14 Südwest-Express	Frankenthal Hbf towards Mannheim Hbf
Pfeddersheim towards Bingen Stadt	RB 35	Terminus
Terminus	RB 62	Hofheim (Ried) towards Biblis
Terminus	RB 63	Hofheim (Ried) towards Bensheim
Preceding station	Rhine-Neckar S-Bahn	Following station
Osthofen towards Mainz Hbf	S6	Bobenheim towards Bensheim
Location

Worms Hauptbahnhof is, along with Worms Pfeddersheim station, one of two operational passenger stations in the Rhenish Hesse city of Worms, Germany. The station with its pedestrian underpass is also an essential link between the eastern and the western parts of central Worms. Every day it is used by about 15,000 people.

== History ==
=== Beginnings ===
The history of the railway to Worm began in 1836, when the governments of France and Bavaria were planning to build a railway along the western bank of the Rhine between Basel and Cologne via Strasbourg and Mainz. Two years later, however, the plans were dropped for economic and military reasons by the other states the railway would have crossed: the Grand Duchies of Baden, Hesse and the Kingdom of Prussia. Instead, the Main-Neckar line was built on the east side of Rhine. Finally, in 1844 some citizens in Mainz and Worms took the initiative to establish a company for building a railway from Mainz to Worms. The private company constructing and later operating it was called the Hessian Ludwig Railway (German: Hessische Ludwigsbahn). Several factors such as the lean years of 1846 and 1847, the democratic uprising in 1848-1850 prolonged the opening of the line from Mainz to Worms until 1853.

=== The first station ===
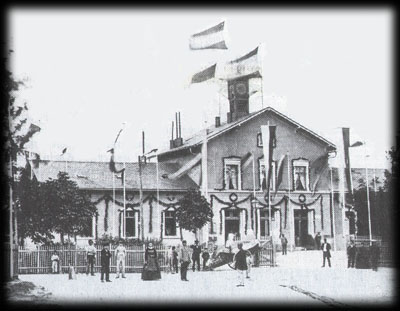
First station building of 1853. The decoration is due to a visit of the king of Prussia

There were discussions for six years in Worms on the location of the new station. The Worms council pressed for a central location near the Rhine port, near the present Rheintorplatz, but on 21 September 1852 the Hessian Ludwig Railway chose a site near the cemetery, now Albert-Schulte Park. On 24 August 1853 the line was opened from Mainz to Worms and three months later, on 15 November, the line was extended to Ludwigshafen.

After an initial underestimation of freight traffic, extra facilities were built at Worms station in the following years: a loading dock, a goods shed and a marshalling yard. Now there were regular freight trains conveying sugar beet, grain, coal and much else to the factories, mills and ports in Worms. Following the opening of the railway there was great growth in industry and population in Worms: in 1849 there were only 89 factory workers; in 1858, there were over 2,000.

=== The second station ===
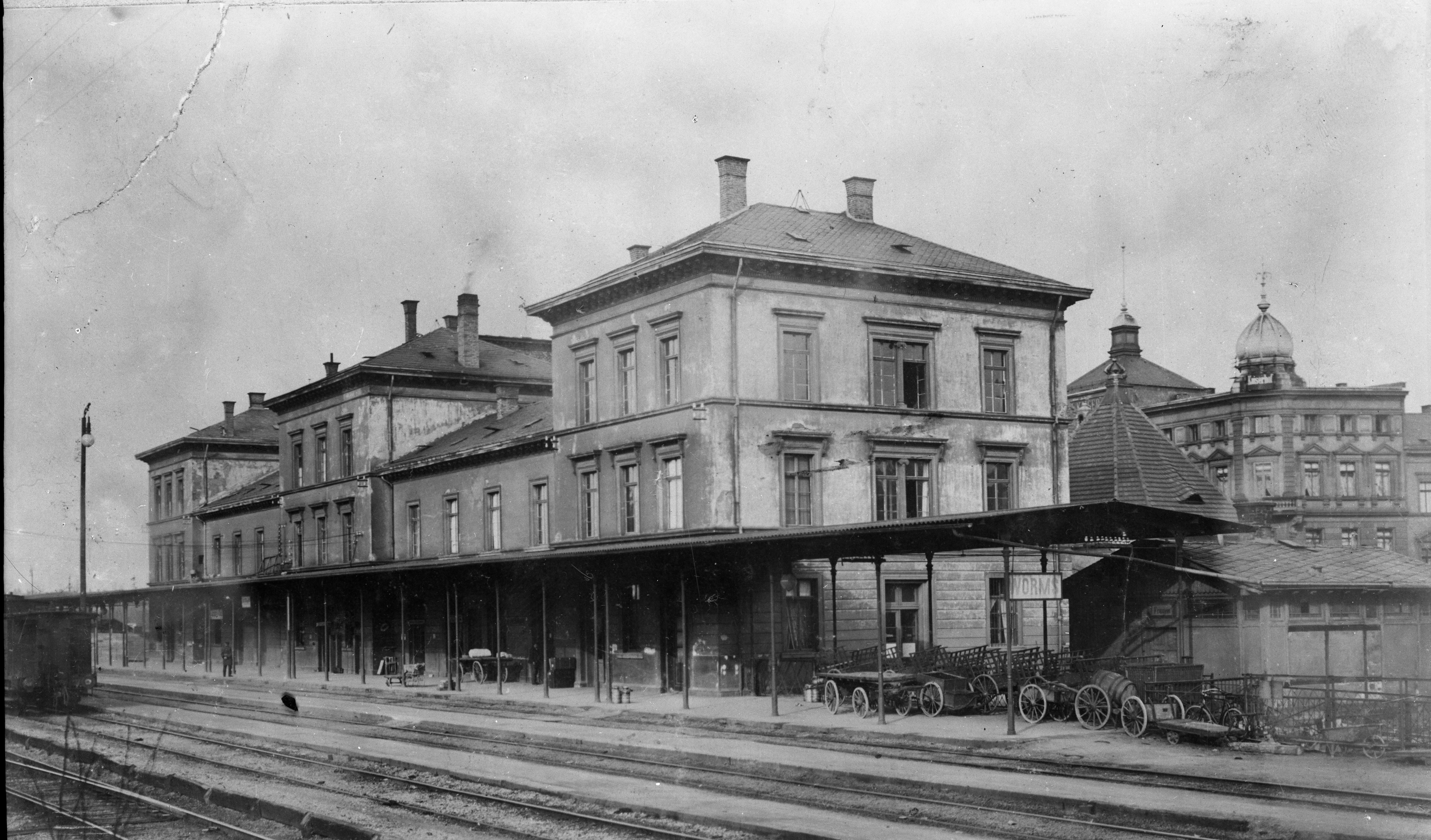
Second station building of 1871

With the growth of passenger traffic, the old station buildings were inadequate. In 1871 the old station building was replaced. The new station building was built in the then fashionable neo-classical style. The arrivals hall had a glazed vestibule and first, second and third class waiting rooms, as well as a royal waiting room. Moreover, there was now sleeping quarters for the station manager, meeting rooms and offices for the railway.

With the construction of new railway lines the Worms station again became inadequate. It had only three platforms, squeezed between Bahnhofstraße and the goods shed.

=== The third station ===
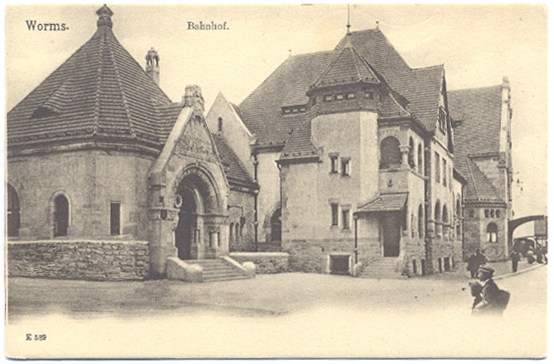
Worms station in 1910 with the pavilion for royals on the left and the main building on the right

In 1890 the Worms town council called for the station's reconstruction or a new station complex. Following considerable discussion on a new site for the station it was decided, however, to build a new station building on the site of the old station building. The new station now had ten tracks, half of them through tracks from Ludwigshafen and Kaiserslautern to Mainz and Frankfurt am Main.

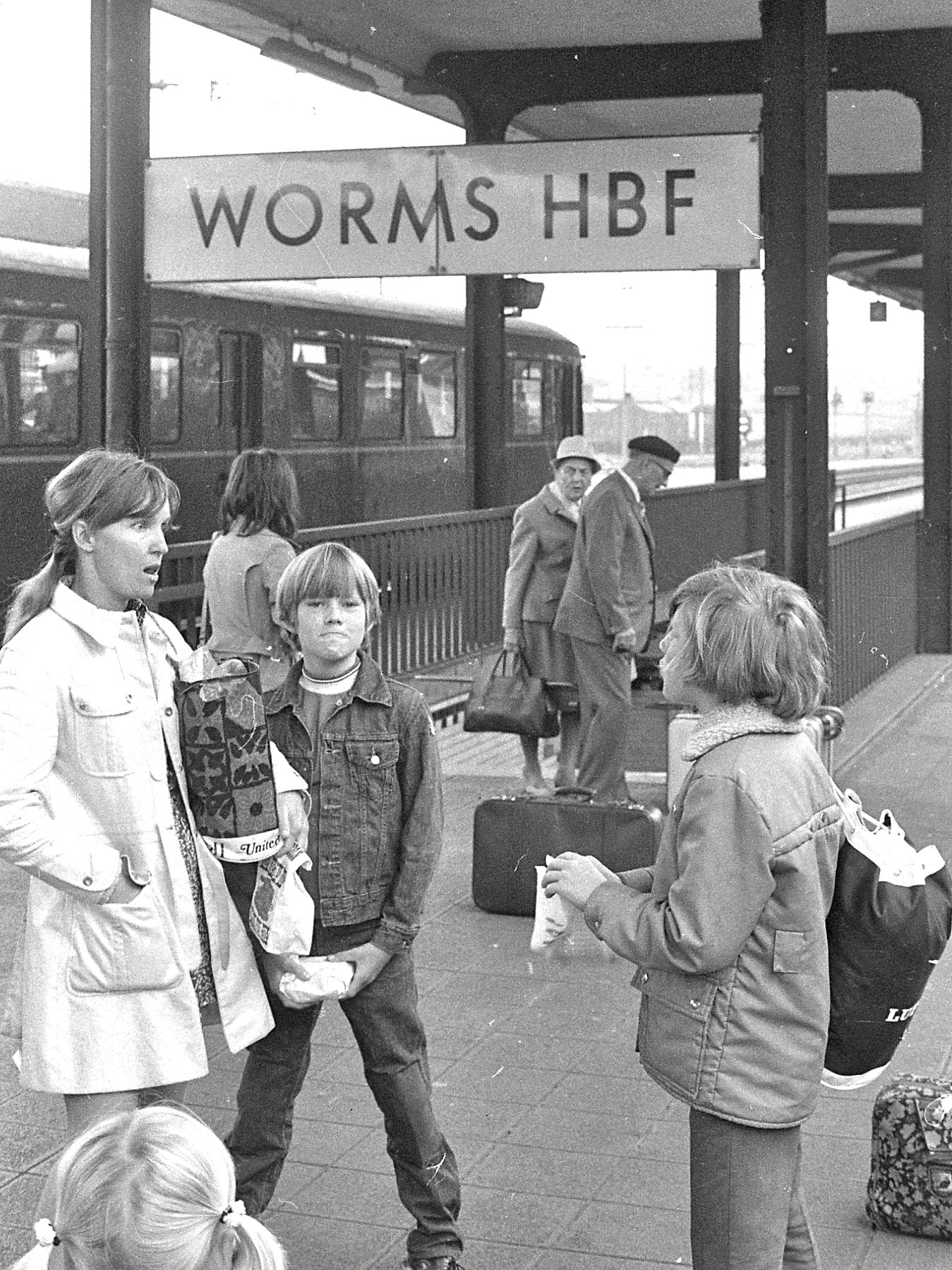
Platform within the station, 1971

After about two and a half years of construction, the new station building and platforms was officially inaugurated on 31 March 1904. The approximately 110 metre-long front side of the station building on Bahnhofstraße was dominated by its entrance hall, which was next to baggage handling facilities and administration offices. On the left side of the entrance hall were the third and fourth-class waiting rooms, in front of a dining room with a bar room; behind it was a corridor, which connected to the first and second class waiting rooms and the stationmaster accommodation. At the left end of the new station building there was also a pavilion for royal travellers.

Approximately 35 years later, at the end of the Second World War, great damage had been done to Worms station: as a result of an air raid on 18 March 1945, all tracks and the interlockings as well as the operations yard, with its rectangular shed, roundhouse and workshops, and the freight yard were completely destroyed. Furthermore, the station building was badly damaged. Subsequently, it took until mid-1945 before trains ran regularly again. Nevertheless, until the end of 1945, 38 of the 53 km of railway tracks in Worms station were still impassable, so that there were still time no operations to Mainz. Only after the founding of the Federal Republic of Germany in 1950, did rail operations in Worms return to normal.

== Operations ==
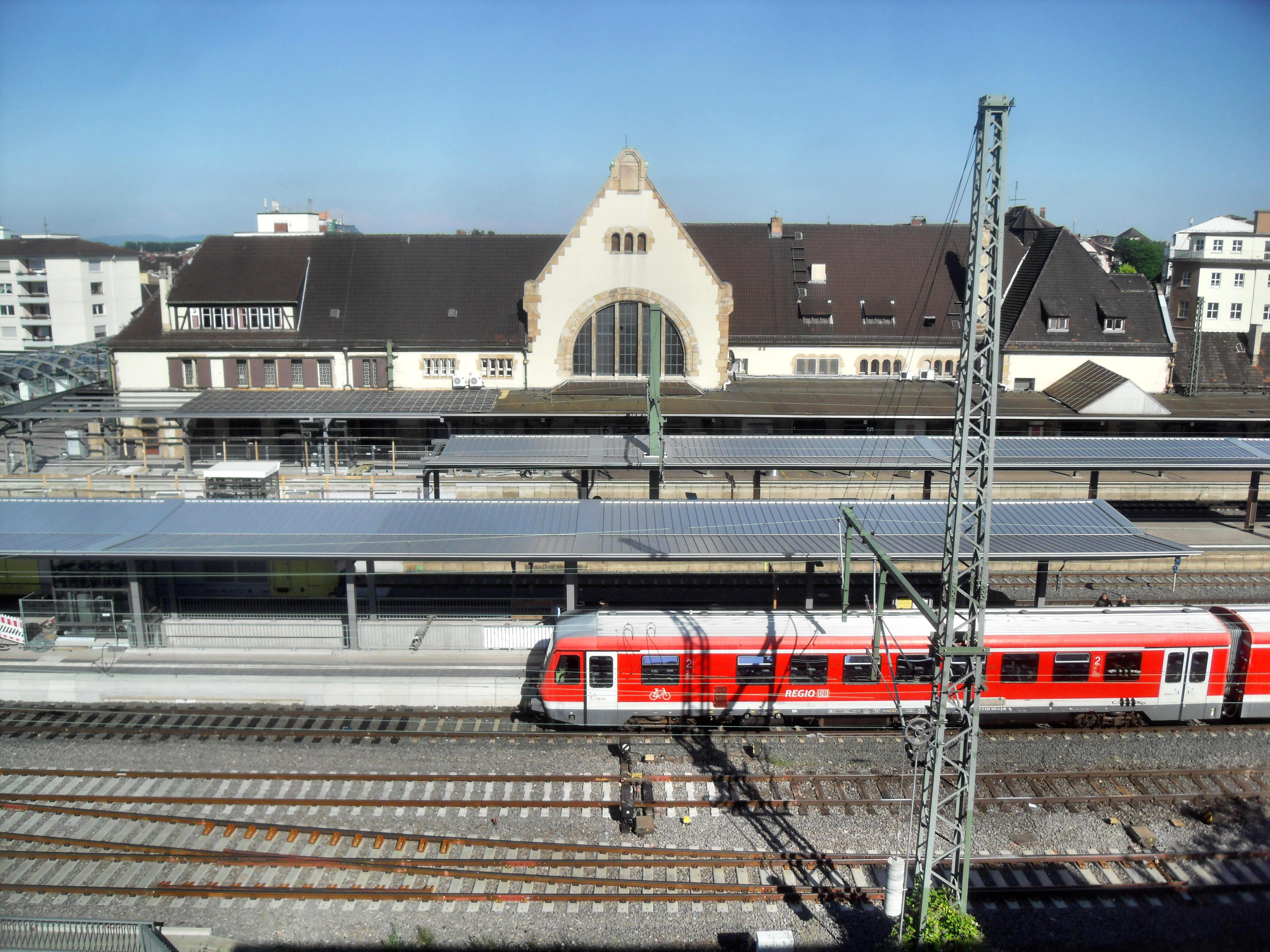
View over tracks 1-5 towards the main station building

=== Long distance ===
The station was served by the following long-distance services in 2026:

Line	Route	Interval
ICE 11	Wiesbaden – Mainz – Worms – Mannheim – Stuttgart – Ulm – Munich	One train
ICE 62	Münster – Dortmund – Duisburg – Cologne – Koblenz – Mainz – Worms – Mannheim – Stuttgart – Munich – Klagenfurt	One train pair

=== Regional ===
The station was served by the following regional services in 2026:

Line	Route	Interval
RE 4	Frankfurt – Mainz – Worms – Frankenthal – Ludwigshafen – Speyer – Germersheim – Karlsruhe	two hourly
RE 14	Frankfurt – Mainz – Worms – Frankenthal – Ludwigshafen Mitte – Mannheim	two hourly
RB 35	Bingen Stadt – Alzey – Monsheim – Worms	hourly
RB 62	Worms – Biblis (with connection to RE 70 to Frankfurt)	hourly
RB 63	Worms – Bürstadt – Bensheim	hourly
S6	Mainz – Worms – Frankenthal – Ludwigshafen – Mannheim (– Neu-Edingen/Mannheim-Friedrichsfeld – Weinheim – Bensheim)	half-hourly

== See also ==
- Rail transport in Germany
- Railway stations in Germany

== Sources ==
=== References ===
- Häussler, Ralph. Eisenbahnen in Worms—Von der Ludwigsbahn zum Rheinland-Pfalz-Takt (Railways in Worms—From the Ludwig Railway to the Rhineland-Palatinate regular interval timetable). Edition Schwarz&Weiss. ISBN 3-935651-10-4.
