= Südbrücke, Mainz =

Südbrücke Mainz-Gustavsburger Eisenbahnbrücke
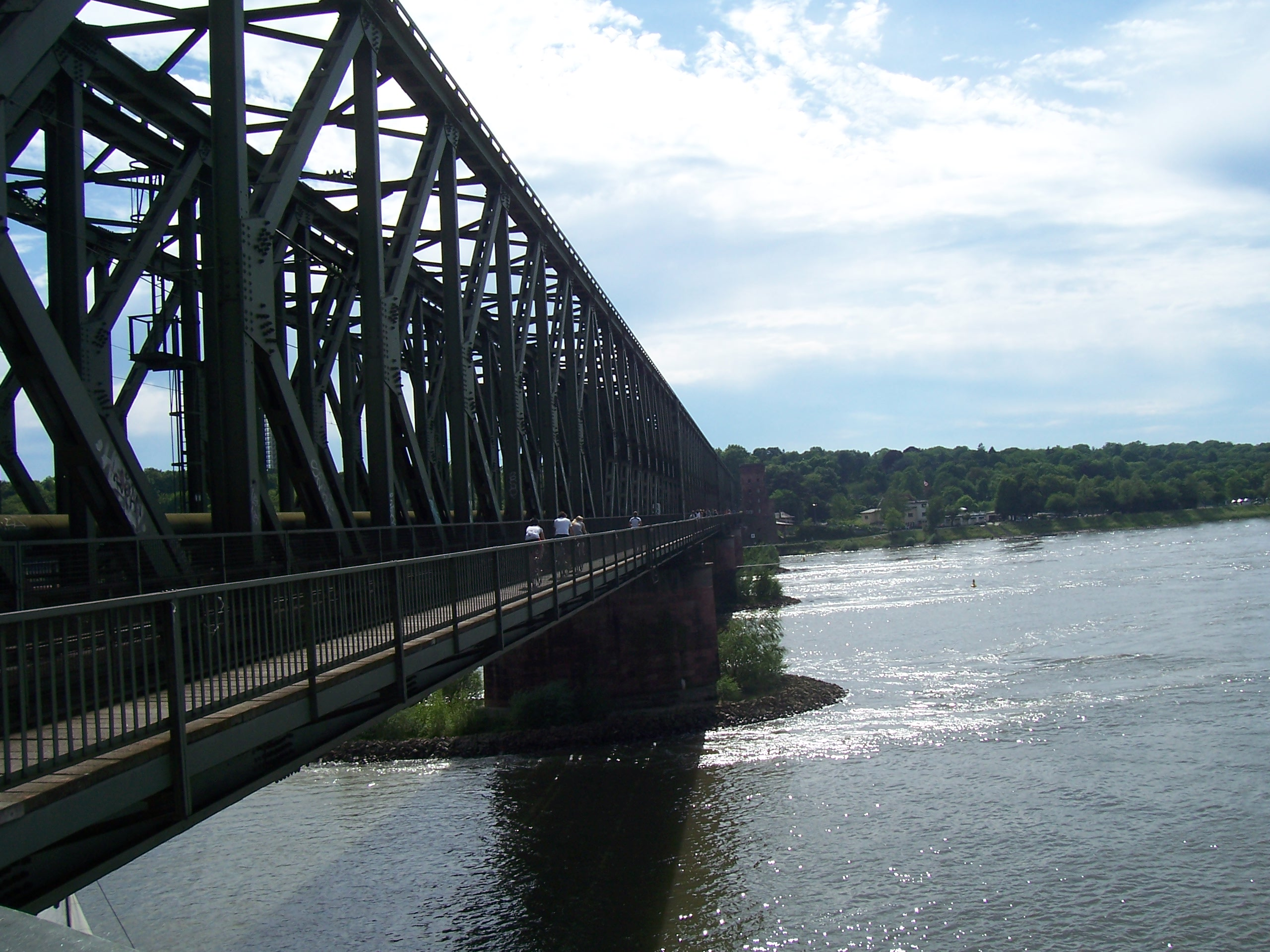
- The Gustavsburger Eisenbahnbrücke in May 2009 from the northeastern bank to the south west, direction Mainz.
- Coordinates: 49°59′29″N 8°17′38″E
- Carried: Railways
- Crossed: River Rhine
- Locale: Rhineland-Palatinate
- Official name: Südbrücke
- Other name(s): Eisenbahnbrücke, Gustavsburger Eisenbahnbrücke, Mainbahn-Rheinbrücke

Characteristics
- Design: Lenticular truss bridge (Pauli system)
- Material: Iron
- Total length: 1,028 m (1,124 yd)
- Longest span: 2 x 106.6 m
- Piers in water: Three
- Clearance above: 9.1 m (10.0 yd)

History
- Designer: Heinrich Gerber
- Constructed by: MAN-Werk Gustavsburg
- Construction start: 1860 (1868), 1910, 1948
- Construction end: 1862 (1871), 1912, 1949
- Collapsed: 1945

The Südbrücke, Mainz ("South bridge") is a railway bridge on the Main Railway that connects Mainz, Rhineland-Palatinate, across the Rhine with Gustavsburg in Hesse. It is one of the early railway bridges in Germany.

== History ==
=== Paulisystembridge (1862) ===
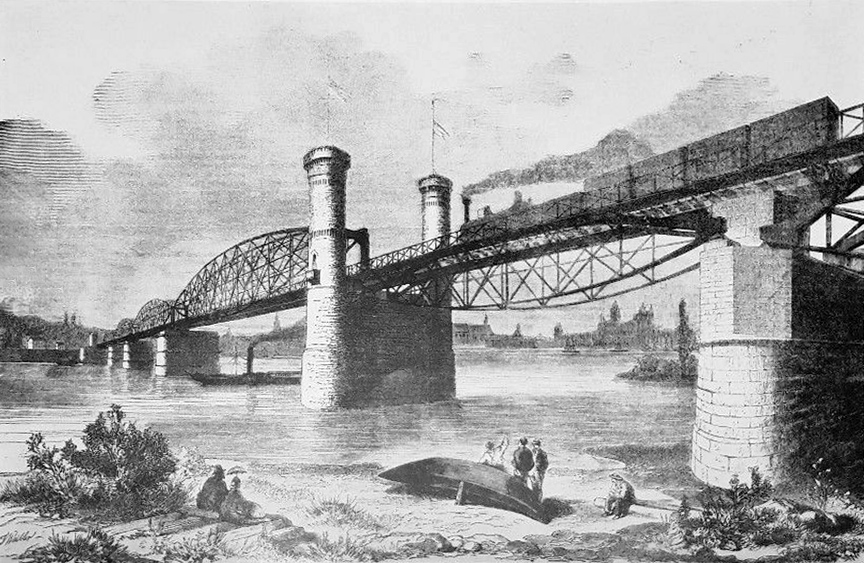
The first construction of the bridge in 1860.

In the period between 1853 and 1859 railways were built by the Hessian Ludwig Railway on the left and right bank of the Rhine. Initially they were connected across the Rhine. As a result, a train ferry was established between Mainz and Gustavsburg, using two pontoons towed by paddle steamer to carry wagons across the Rhine. Passengers could use the steamer as a ferry from 1 August 1858.

In between 1860 and 1862, the south bridge was designed by the engineering works and iron foundry Maschinenfabrik und Eisengießerei J. F. Klett (later Maschinenfabrik Augsburg-Nürnberg - MAN) originating from Nuremberg.

Since the Roman bridge (Pons Ingeniosa) first built c. 30 AD and the Carolingian Rhine bridge of Charlemagne, it had been the first permanent bridge across the Rhine at Mainz, which until then had only a bridge of boats. It was after the Waldshut–Koblenz Rhine Bridge on the Upper Rhine, the cathedral Bridge in Cologne and the Kehl bridge the fourth railway bridge over the Rhine.

==== Design ====
The bridge was built according to the plans of Heinrich Gerber, the Head of Bridge Division of Maschinenfabrik Klett. The puddled iron (wrought iron) structure bridge had four 105.2-metre-long (345 ft) bridge segments. The Pauli truss structure was arranged above the roadway, according to the Pauli lenticular truss bridge recently developed by Friedrich August von Pauli. Right of Rhine joined a long flood bridge with 28 other fields. [2] At both bridgeheads were they equipped with scheduled by district architect Ignaz victims man Gothic gates and bridge towers, which were to serve in time of war to defend the bridge.

== Sources ==
- Bauer, Sibylle (2004), "Die älteste Steinbrücke am Rhein – stand sie in Mainz? Neuer Holzfund als Indiz für einen frührömischen Brückenschlag", Antike Welt, vol. 35, no. 3, pp. 83–84
