= Hessian Ludwig Railway =

Transport company

The Hessian Ludwig Railway (German: Hessische Ludwigsbahn) or HLB with its network of 697 kilometres of railway was one of the largest privately owned railway companies in Germany.

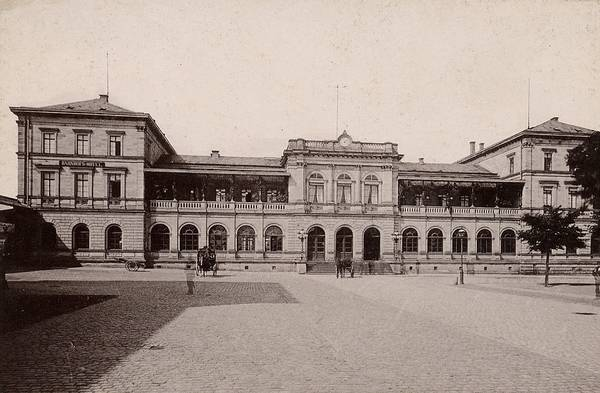
Station of Hessian Ludwig Railway in Darmstadt

== Early history ==
The Hessian Ludwig Railway was a product of the failed – or, more accurately, non-existent – railway politics in the Grand Duchy of Hesse. Whilst the province of Starkenburg was given a central railway link, the Main-Neckar Railway very early on and the province of Upper Hesse at least had connexions to the railway network through the Main-Weser Railway at its periphery - the Grand Duchy had shares in both lines and they were operated as joint railways (Kondominalbahnen) – the third province, Rhenish Hesse (Rheinhessen), had no such facilities.

Because the state was not active in this area, there was an opportunity for private involvement in the shape of a joint stock company (Aktiengesellschaft). The HQ of the Hessian Ludwig Railway was therefore not based in the capital of Darmstadt, but in the provincial capital for Rhenish Hesse, Mainz. The first impetus for the construction of a line in Rhenish Hesse came not however from local people, but from outside; in particular the Bavarian Palatinate was interested. For military strategic reasons the Prussian state disapproved of a route running west of the Rhine. The Grand Duchy of Baden saw the project competing with the Main-Neckar Railway in which Baden also had shares.

When, in 1844, the Bavarian government issued a licence for railway construction in the Bavarian Palatinate, a northern expansion of the railway into Rhenish Hesse appeared attractive. In addition, the pioneer of the German railways, Friedrich List, personally championed the building of a line from Mainz to Worms. The grand ducal government in Darmstadt however, initially remained opposed, especially as it had passed a law in 1842 for a state railway system. From 1845 onwards, however, there were proponents in the government for a private railway for the province of Rhenish Hesse.

== Lines ==
=== Mainz – Ludwigshafen – (France) (1853) ===
At first, the route to be used was totally unclear. The alternative from Mainz via Alzey to Worms was soon discarded in favour of a direct route along the Rhine. On 15 August 1845 a licence was granted to the Mainz-Ludwigshafen Railway Company (Mainz-Ludwigshafener-Eisenbahngesellschaft). The company was later renamed to the Hessian Ludwig Railway Company (Hessische-Ludwigs-Eisenbahngesellschaft) or HLB – in honour of Louis III, Grand Duke of Hesse and by Rhine, although he initially opposed the building of the line. In the times following the HLB got increasingly into financial deep water, because several share holders withdrew their money. Construction began in spring 1848. However, as the state purse became empty as a result of the revolution of 1848, the state could no longer be relied on to provide any support and the construction of the line threatened to grind to a halt. Not until August 1852 did the Hesse-Darmstadt government, decided to support the HLB. In addition a treaty was agreed with Kingdom of Bavaria for the entire Mainz–Ludwigshafen line.

Whilst the city of Worms would have preferred a station in the vicinity of the port, the HLB, after a degree of toing and froing, built it further west where it is today. Thereafter building proceeded apace and the 46 kilometre long route was opened in several sections from Mainz to Worms during the period 23 March (Mainz – Oppenheim) to 24 August 1853. From 15 November 1853 trains ran through from Mainz to Ludwigshafen. Initially there were 6 passenger trains daily (2 of which were expresses) in each direction between Mainz and Worms. In Mainz there was a connexion to the steamships of the Cologne and Düsseldorf Company for Steamships on the Rhine River (Kölnische und Düsseldorfer Gesellschaft für Rhein-Dampfschiffahrt).

=== Rhine-Main-Railway ===
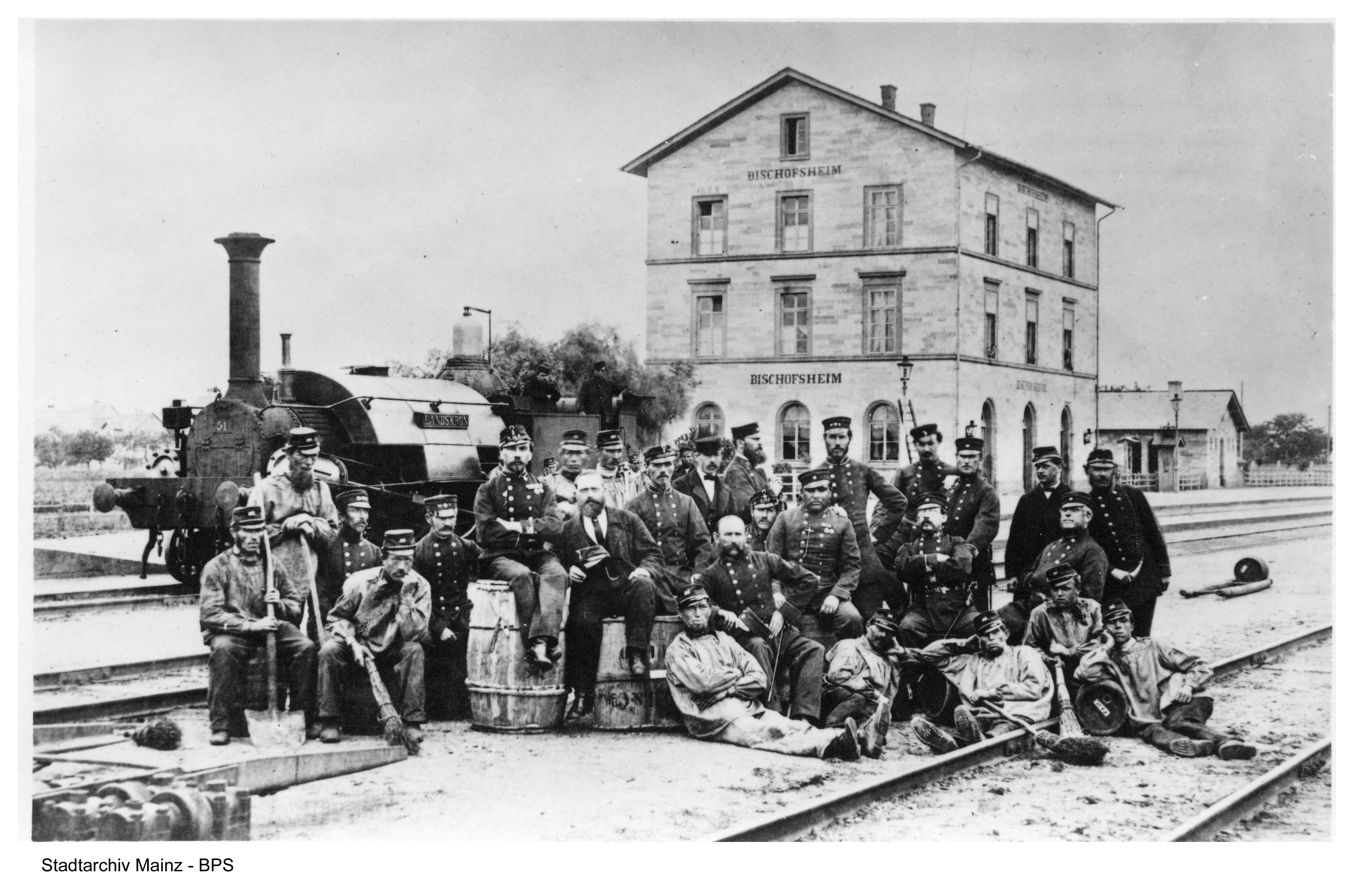
Bischofsheim Junction with shunting locomotive "Landskron" and station staff, 1867

On 1 of August 1858 the Rhine-Main line from Mainz via Darmstadt to Aschaffenburg in Bavaria was opened. Initially the Rhine river was crossed by a train ferry east of the railway station Mainz Neuthor (today: Mainz Römisches Theater station) until a newly designed Rhine bridge was constructed by MAN-Werk Gustavsburg and given to traffic on 1 of December 1862. This line not only connected Mainz, second in importance after the grand-ducal capital, with Darmstadt. But it enabled also to run trains through from the Bavarian railways up the Rhine valley to Cologne and further on to Belgium.

=== Expansion of the network ===
Over the succeeding decades the following lines were added to the network and the HLB became the major provider of rail services within the two southern provinces of the grand-duchy (Rheinhessen and Starkenburg) as well as one of the largest privately owned railways of Germany.

- West Rhine Railway (Linksrheinische Bahn) – 1859 (Mainz-Bingen)
- Frankfurt City Link Line (Städtische Verbindungsbahn Frankfurt) – 1862 (owned by the City of Frankfurt, rail services provided by HLB)
- Frankfurt-Hanau Railway (Frankfurt-Hanauer Eisenbahn) - owned by the private Frankfurt-Hanau Railway Company, rail services were operated by the HLB from 1863. It purchased the line in 1872.
- Main Railway Mainbahn – 1863 (Mainz-Frankfurt)
- Worms–Bingen Stadt railway (Rheinhessenbahn) – 1864 to 1871
- Darmstadt–Worms railway Riedbahn - from 1869 (Darmstadt [later: Frankfurt]-Rosengarten [right bank of Rhine river, opposite Worms])
- Nibelungen Railway Nibelungenbahn – 1869 (Rosengarten-Bensheim)
- Alzey–Mainz railway (1871)
- Taunus Railway Taunus-Eisenbahn – 1871, sold in 1872 to the Prussian state railways
- Wiesbachtalbahn - 1871-1895
- Main-Lahn Railway Main-Lahn-Bahn – 1877 (Frankfurt-Limburg an der Lahn)
- Ländches Railway (Ländchesbahn) (Wiesbaden-Niedernhausen) - 1879
- Odenwald Railway (Odenwaldbahn) – 1882 (Darmstadt / Hanau-Eberbach)

== Route numbers ==
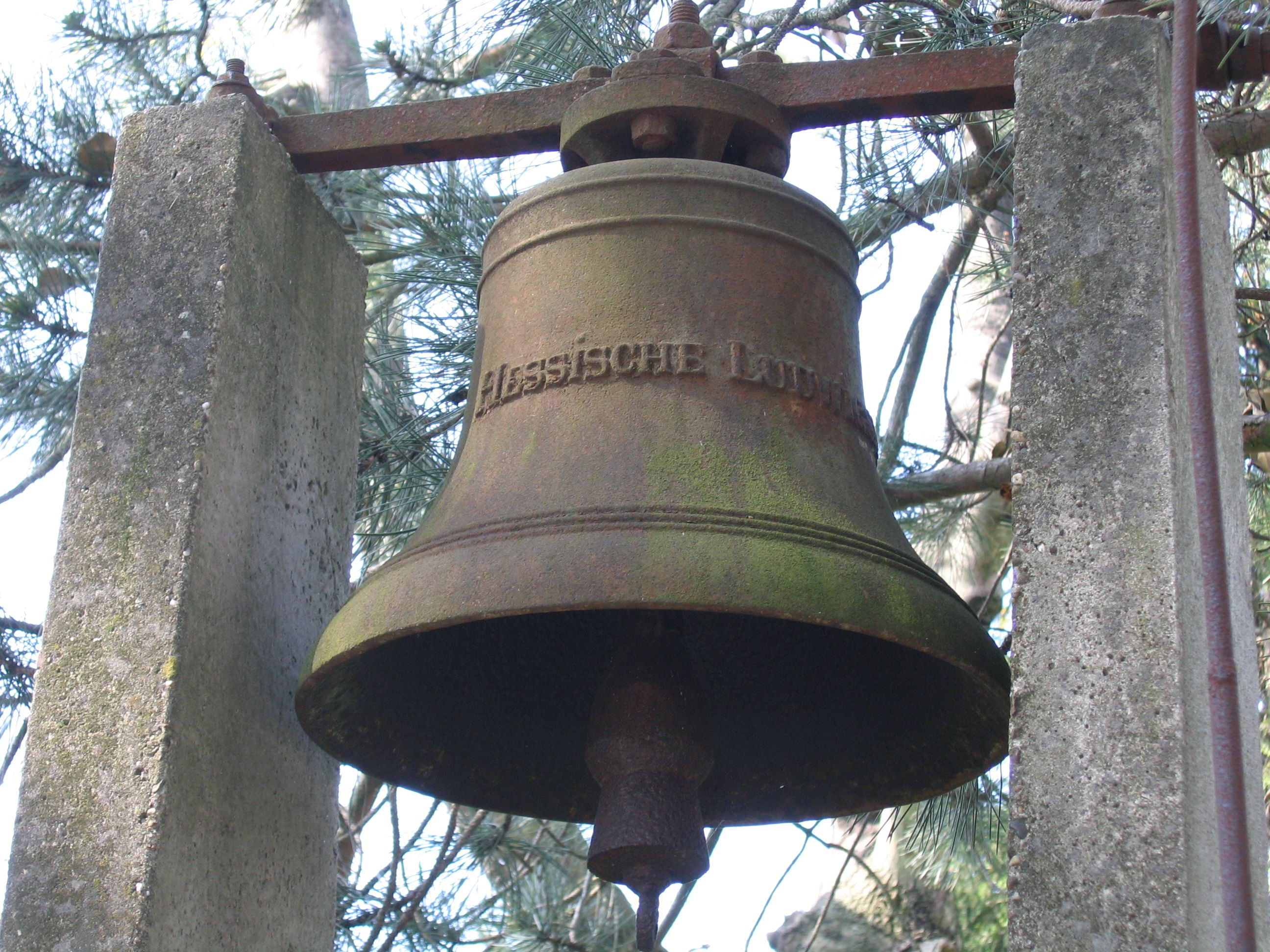
Station bell of HLB. Today in second hand use on the cemetery of Pfungstadt

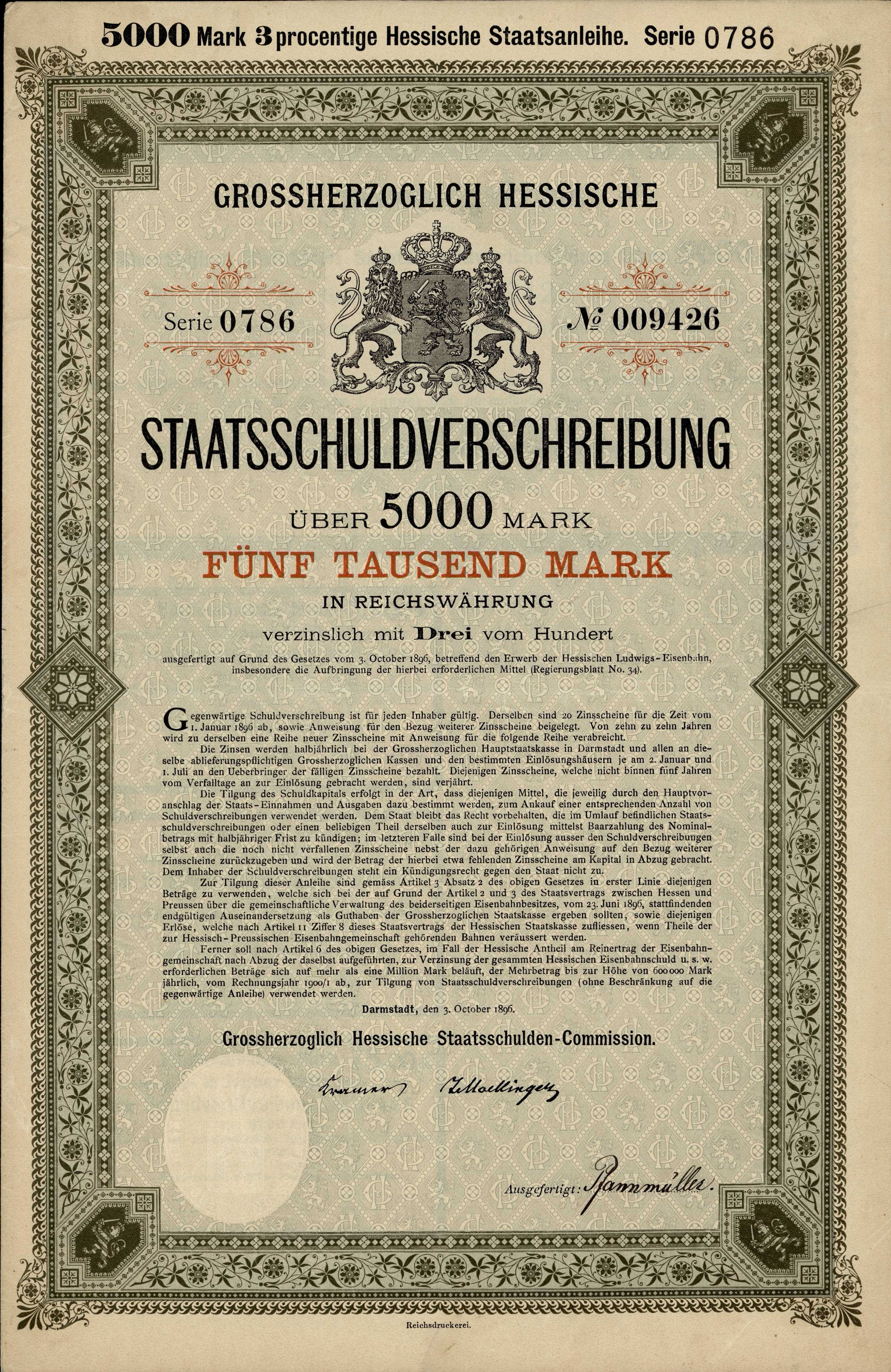
Bond of the Grand Dutchy of Hesse, issued 3. October 1896; for financing the nationalization of the Hessian Ludwig Railway

In the early 1890s the HLB numbered its routes as follows:

- Line 1 : Frankfurt - Hanau - Eberbach
- Line 2 : Darmstadt - Wiebelsbach-Heubach
- Line 3 : Mainz - Alzey
- Line 4 : Armsheim - Wendelsheim
- Line 5 : Bingen - Alzey - Worms
- Line 6 : Mannheim - Worms über Lampertheim
- Line 7 : Bingen - Mainz - Frankfurt
- Line 8 : Mainz - Worms
- Line 9 : Mainz - Darmstadt - Aschaffenburg
- Line 10 : Frankfurt - Hanau - Aschaffenburg
- Line 11 : Frankfurt - Limburg
- Line 12 : Wiesbaden - Niedernhausen
- Line 13 : Frankfurt - Mannheim
- Line 14 : Darmstadt - Worms
- Line 15 : Bensheim - Worms

== Nationalisation ==
On 1 April 1897 the HLB was nationalised and became part of the Prussian-Hessian Railway Operating and Financial Association. The abbreviation "HLB" was said by the local people to stand for Hoch lebe Bismarck (Long live Bismarck).

== Stock ==
=== Locomotives ===
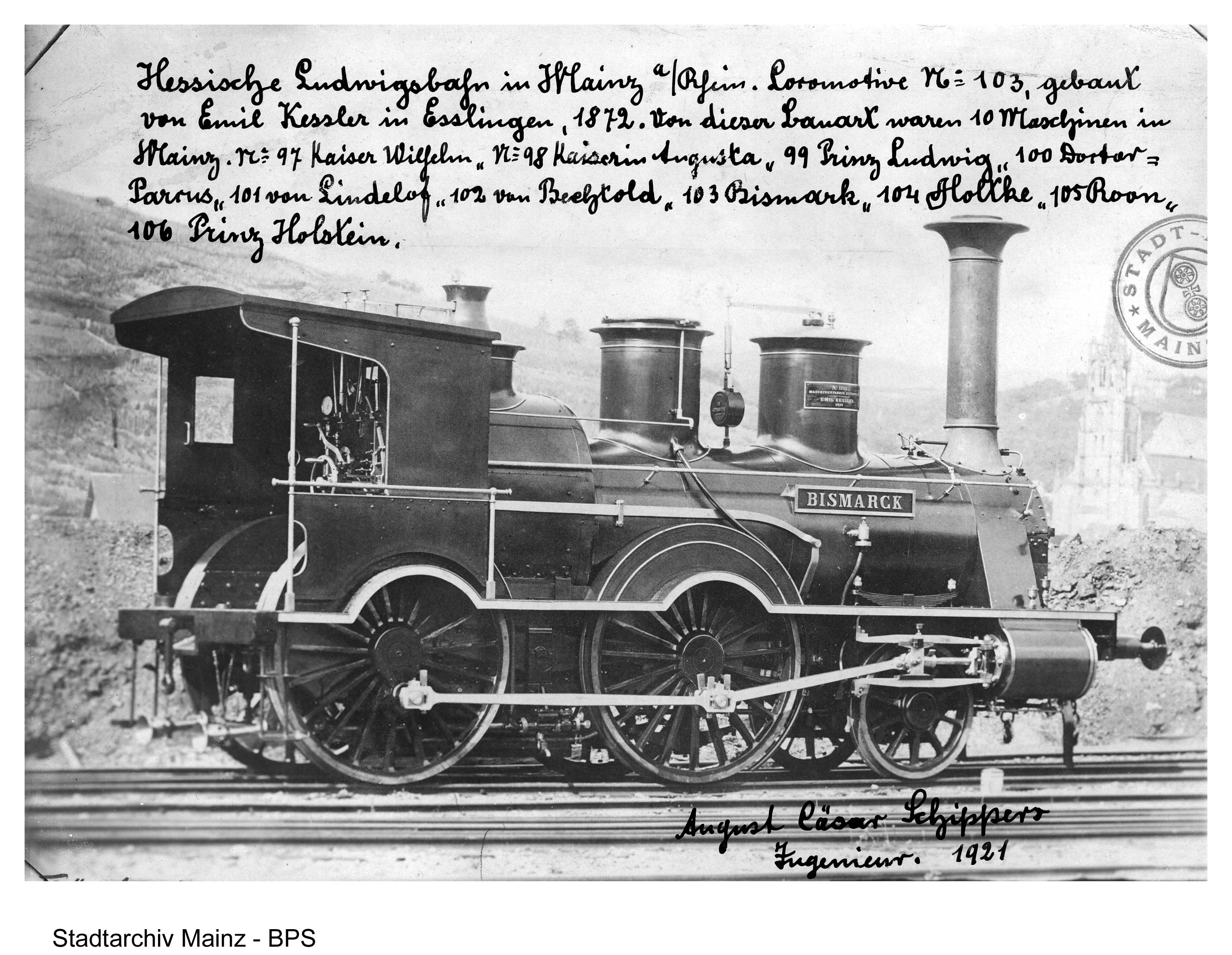
Locomotive No. 103, Bismarck, built by Maschinenfabrik Esslingen, 1872, for Hessische Ludwigsbahn

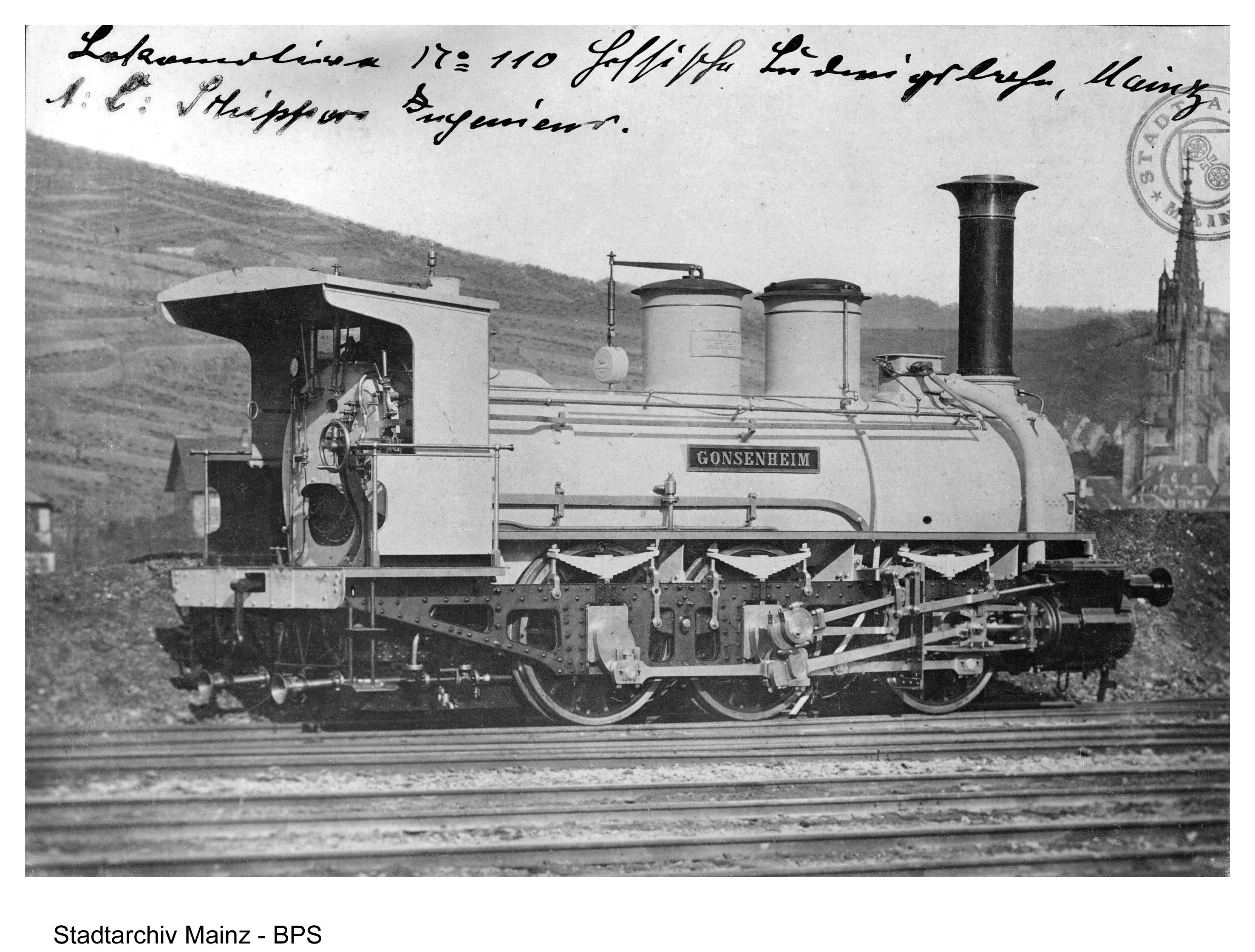
Locomotive No. 110, Gonsenheim of Hessische Ludwigsbahn

The Hessian Ludwig Railway began operations with 6 steam locomotives from the Maschinenfabrik Esslingen; these sported (as was then common) illustrious names: Schenk (after Freiherr von Schenk, director of the Hessian Finance Ministry), Dalwigk (after Freiherr von Dalwigk, then Hesse's Ministerialdirektor and ex Territorialkommissär for Mainz - this engine hauled the first train on the Mainz - Oppenheim line), Gutenberg (after Johannes Gensfleisch called Johannes Gutenberg, the inventor of the printing press), Arnold Walpoden (after Arnold Walpoden, the initiator of the Rheinische Bund in 1254) as well as Mainz and Worms.

At the end of 1895, i.e. one year before the Hessian Ludwig Railway was nationalised, it had 216 locomotives.

=== Coach fleet ===
In addition to 11 1st and 2nd class passenger coaches the HLB had 19 3rd class coaches and 36 luggage vans and goods wagons to begin with (there was no 4th class). In 1861 the HLB had 39 locomotives and in 1864 52.

At the end of 1895 the fleet comprised 544 coaches, 107 luggage vans, 1552 covered and 2240 open wagons.

== See also ==
- Grand Duchy of Hesse
- Prussian-Hessian Railway Company

== Sources ==
- Hans Döhn: Eisenbahnpolitik und Eisenbahnbau in Rheinhessen 1835-1914. Mainz 1957.
- Ralph Häussler: Eisenbahnen in Worms - Von der Ludwigsbahn zum Rheinland-Pfalz-Takt. Kehl, Hamm/Rheinhessen 2003. ISBN 3-935651-10-4
- Bernhard Hager: ’Aufsaugung durch Preußen’ oder ‚Wohltat für Hessen’?. Die preußisch-hessische Eisenbahngemeinschaft von 1896/97. In Andreas Hedwig (ed.), „Auf eisernen Schienen, so schnell wie der Blitz“. Regionale und überregionale Aspekte der Eisenbahngeschichte = Schriften des hessischen Staatsarchivs Marburg 19, Marburg 2008.
- Wolfgang Klee und Günther Scheingraber: Preußische Eisenbahngeschichte (=Preußen-Report. Band 1.2), Teil 2 1870/71 - 1920. Merker, Fürstenfeldbruck 1992. ISBN 3-922404-38-3
- Peter Scheffler: Eisenbahnknotenpunkt Mainz/Wiesbaden. Eisenbahn-Kurier-Verl., Freiburg 1988. ISBN 3-88255-620-X
