= Andreas Hedwig =

German archivist

Andreas Hedwig (born in 1959) is a German archivist and since 2014 the head of the Hessian State Archive.

== Life ==
Born in Leverkusen, Hedwig completed a teacher training and completed this in 1986 with a second Staatsexamen. He then received his doctorate in 1989. In 1990/91 he was Research Assistant at the University of Bremen. Between 1991 and 1993 he completed a referendariat. In 1993 he took a position as a staff member at the Hessisches Hauptstaatsarchiv in Wiesbaden. Since 2001 he has been head of the Hessian State Archive Marburg, has taught at the Archivschule Marburg since 2003 and at the University of Marburg since 2008. Since 2014 he has been head of the Hessisches Landesarchiv. Hedwig was appointed honorary professor at the University of Marburg in 2016. The appointment as President of the Hessian State Archive followed in April 2018.

Since 2005 Hedwig has been chairman of the Historische Kommission für Hessen.

== Publications ==
- Studien zum Polyptychon von Saint-Germain-des-Prés. Böhlau, Cologne/Weimar/Wien 1993 [together with Konrad Elmshäuser], ISBN 3-412-11692-0.
- (ed.) Napoleon und das Königreich Westphalen. Herrschaftssystem und Modellstaatspolitik. Historische Kommission für Hessen, Marburg 2008 [together with Klaus Malettke and Karl Murk], ISBN 978-3-7708-1324-7.
- (ed.) Adelsarchive. Zentrale Quellenbestände oder Curiosa?. Hessisches Staatsarchiv Marburg, Marburg 2009 [together with Karl Murk, ISBN 3-88964-202-0.
- (ed.) Die Verfolgung der Juden während der NS-Zeit. Stand und Perspektiven der Dokumentation, der Vermittlung und der Erinnerung. Historische Kommission für Hessen, Marburg 2011, ISBN 978-3-88964-205-9.
- (ed.) Die Brüder Grimm in Marburg. Hessisches Staatsarchiv Marburg, Marburg 2013, ISBN 978-3-88964-210-3.
- (ed.) Finanzpolitik und Schuldenkrisen 16.-20. Jahrhundert. Historische Kommission für Hessen, Marburg 2014, ISBN 978-3-88964-214-1.
- (ed.) Bündnisse und Friedensschlüsse in Hessen. Aspekte friedenssichernder und friedensstiftender Politik der Landgrafschaft Hessen im Mittelalter und in der Neuzeit. Historische Kommission für Hessen, Marburg 2016, ISBN 978-3-88964-217-2.
- (ed.) Zeitenwende in Hessen. Revolutionärer Aufbruch 1918/1919 in die Demokratie. Hessisches Staatsarchiv Marburg, Marburg 2019, ISBN 978-3-88964-221-9.
