= Halle Rosengarten station =

Railway station in Halle (Saale), Germany

Halle Rosengarten
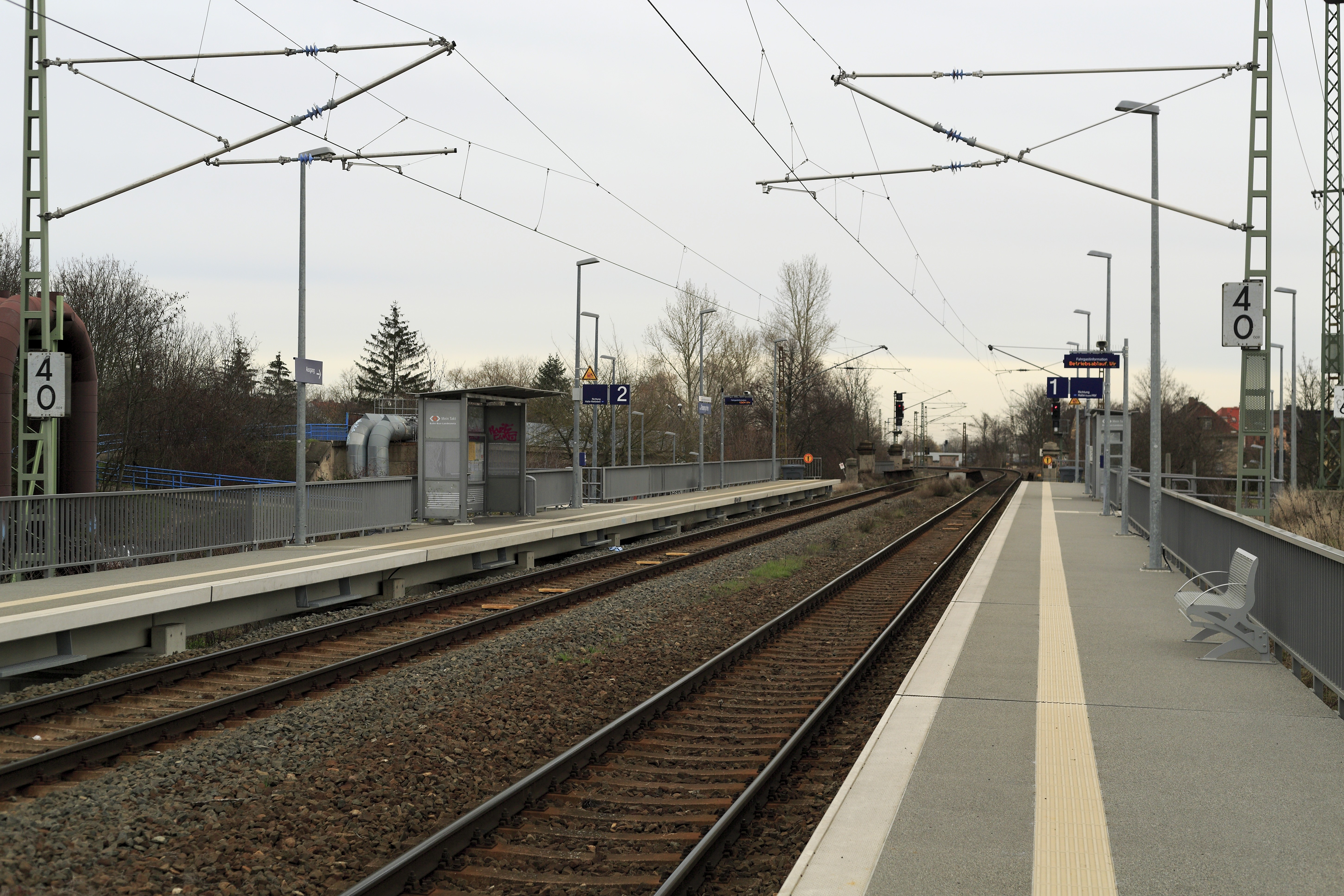
- 2020

General information
- Location: Merseburger Straße 295; 06132 Halle (Saale); Saxony-Anhalt; Germany
- Coordinates: 51.4469°N 11.9828°E
- System: Hp
- Owner: Deutsche Bahn
- Operator: DB Netz; DB Station&Service
- Lines: Halle–Hann. Münden railway (KBS 590)
- Platforms: 2 side platforms
- Tracks: 2
- Train operators: Abellio Rail Mitteldeutschland; DB Regio Südost
- Connections: 5

Other information
- Station code: 5346
- DS100 code: LRO
- IBNR: 8080570
- Category: 6
- Fare zone: MDV: 210
- Website: www.bahnhof.de

Services
Preceding station	Mitteldeutschland S-Bahn	Following station
Halle-Silberhöhe towards Halle-Nietleben	S 3	Halle (Saale) Hbf towards Wurzen or Oschatz
Halle-Silberhöhe towards Lutherstadt Eisleben or Sangerhausen	S 7	Halle (Saale) Hbf Terminus
Location
- Location within Saxony-Anhalt Location within Germany Location within Europe

Halle Rosengarten station is a railway station in the Rosengarten district in the municipality of Halle (Saale), Saxony-Anhalt, Germany.
