= Nibelung Railway =

Overview
- Native name: Nibelungenbahn
- Line number: 3570 (Worms–Hofheim); 3571 (Hofheim–Bensheim); 3577 (Lorsch–Heppenheim)
- Locale: Rhineland-Palatinate and Hesse, Germany
- Termini: Worms; Bensheim

Service
- Route number: 653

Technical
- Line length: 5.6 kilometres (3.5 mi); 18.3 kilometres (11.4 mi); 5.2 kilometres (3.2 mi)
- Track gauge: 1,435 mm (4 ft 8 1/2 in) standard gauge

The Nibelung Railway (German: Nibelungenbahn) is a 23.9 km long electrified line between Worms in the German state of Rhineland-Palatinate and Bensheim in Hesse. Its name refers to the fact that the line connects several places that play an important role in the Nibelung legend.

== History ==
After 1846, when the Main-Neckar Railway was opened in the north–south direction along the Bergstraße (Mountain Road), it was also planned to build a railway to open up the Hessian part of the Vorderer Odenwald ("forward Odenwald", the western Odenwald near the Bergstraße). One aim was to connect raw materials originating from this area with the port of Worms. In the 1860s, the preliminary planning phase began, with both the town of Bensheim and the more southerly located Heppenheim campaigning to be picked as the starting point of the Odenwald line. One problem, however, was dealing with the slopes across the Bergstraße.

Despite the unfinished plans for an Odenwald line, the Nibelung Railway was opened on 27 October 1869. It had been decided to build the Worms–Bensheim route, with the line between Worms and Hofheim shared with the Ried Railway (Riedbahn). In 1879, a branch of the Ried Railway (now the main line) was opened to Mannheim, crossing the Nibelungen Railway in Bürstadt, where a two-level interchange station was built.

Meanwhile, the plans for the Odenwald line were not implemented until 1890. The final route was opened in 1895 as the Weschnitz Valley Railway (Weschnitztalbahn), starting in Weinheim and following the valley of the Weschnitz.

It was not until 1903 that the Heppenheim–Lorsch link was built. The traffic volume was below expectations because of the failure to connect the Nibelung Railway with the Odenwald. Several decades later, the Heppenheim–Lorsch line was closed and dismantled.

== Operations ==
The remaining Nibelung Railway is still only a lightly used branch line, operated by Deutsche Bahn (DB) with diesel multiple units of class 628 as Regionalbahn service RB 63. From Monday to Friday Regionalbahn services run hourly, mostly crossing in Bürstadt. Especially on Sundays, services are limited to run at two-hourly intervals. The line is entirely within the area administered by the Verkehrsverbund Rhein-Neckar (Rhine-Neckar Transport Association, VRN). The fares of the Rhein-Main-Verkehrsverbund (Rhine-Main Transport Association, RMV) also apply for travel towards Darmstadt and Frankfurt.

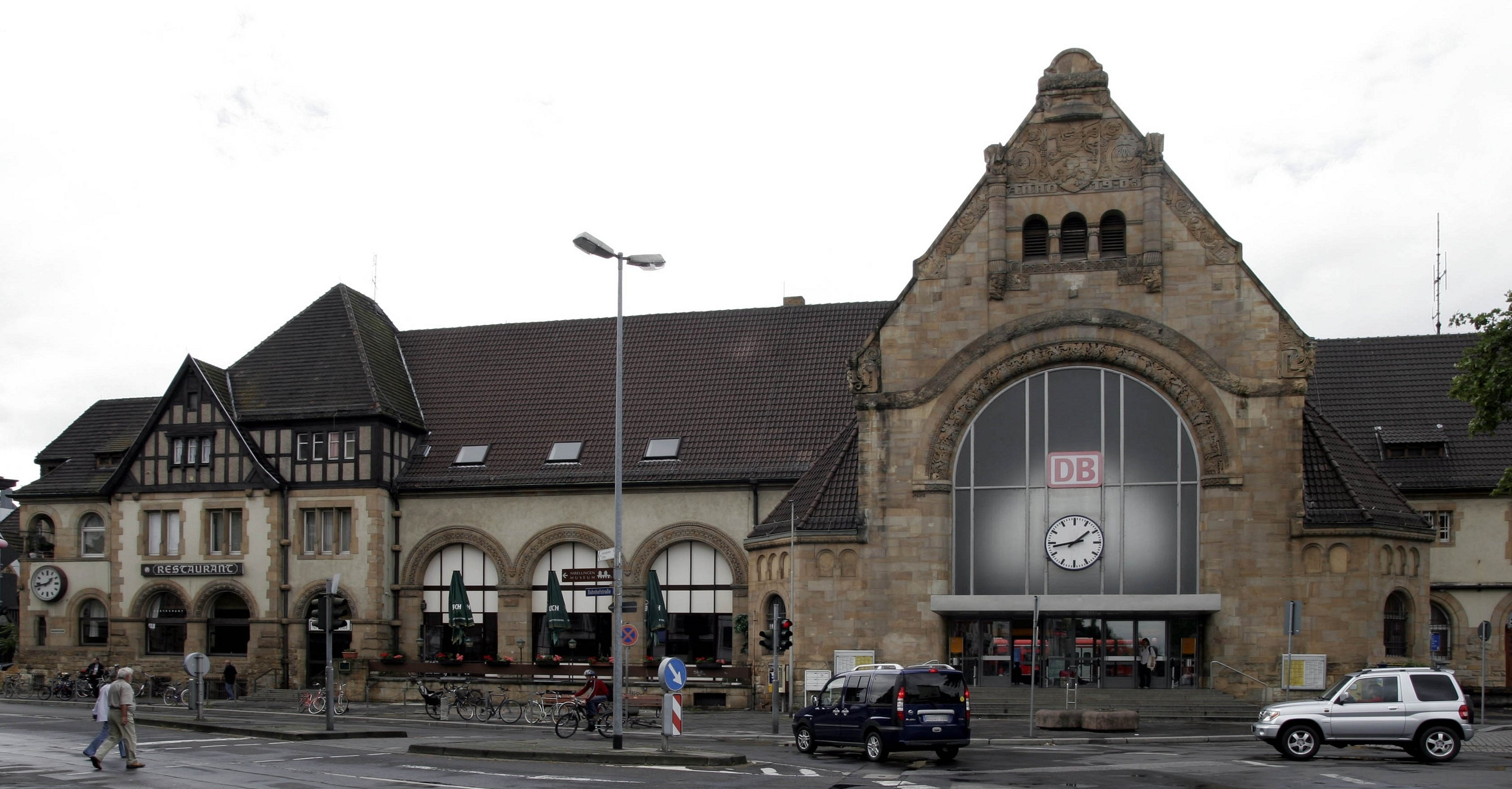
Worms Central Station, the beginning of the Nibelung Railway (street side)

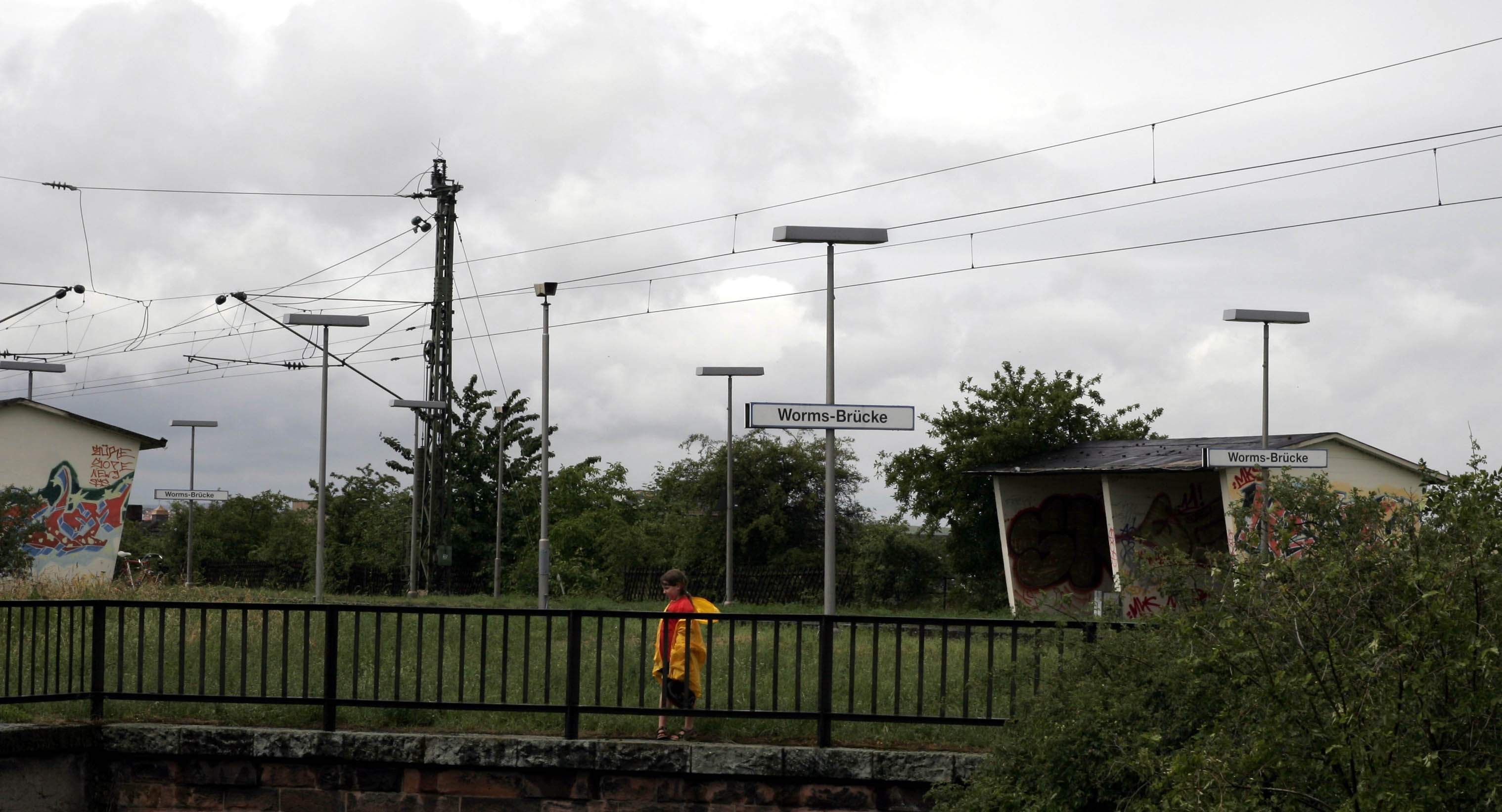
Worms-Brücke station

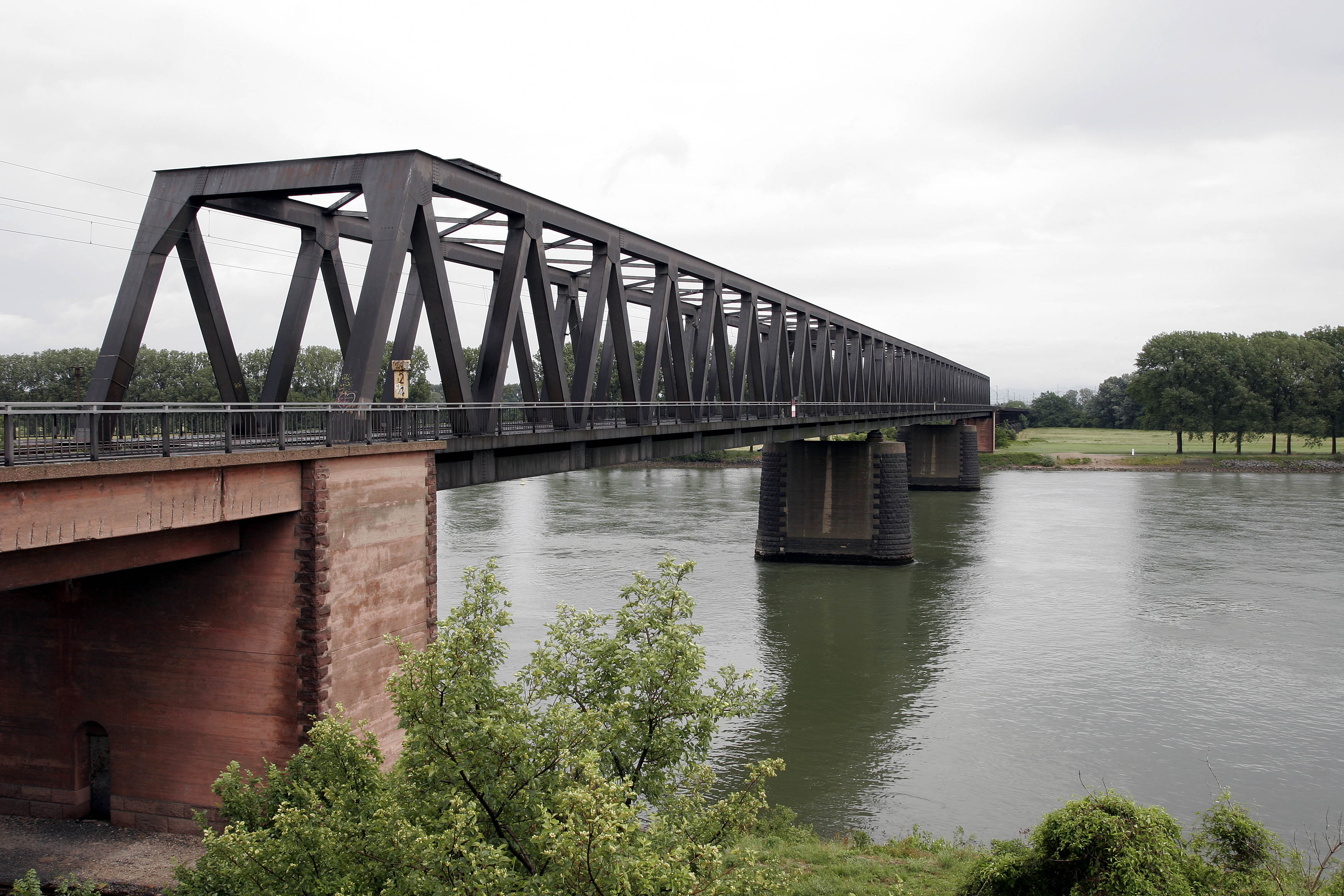
The bridge over the Rhine seen from Worms

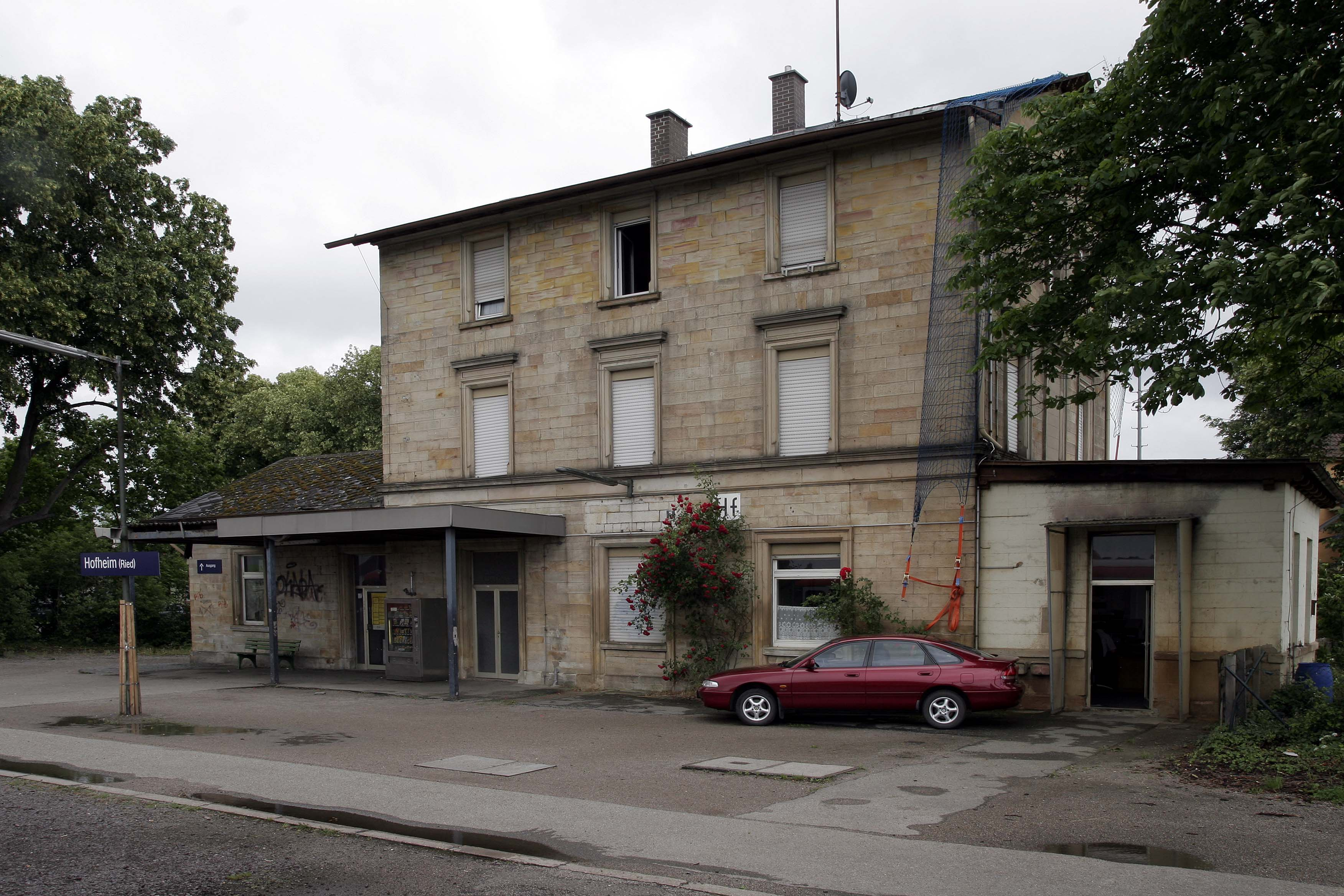
Hofheim im Ried station

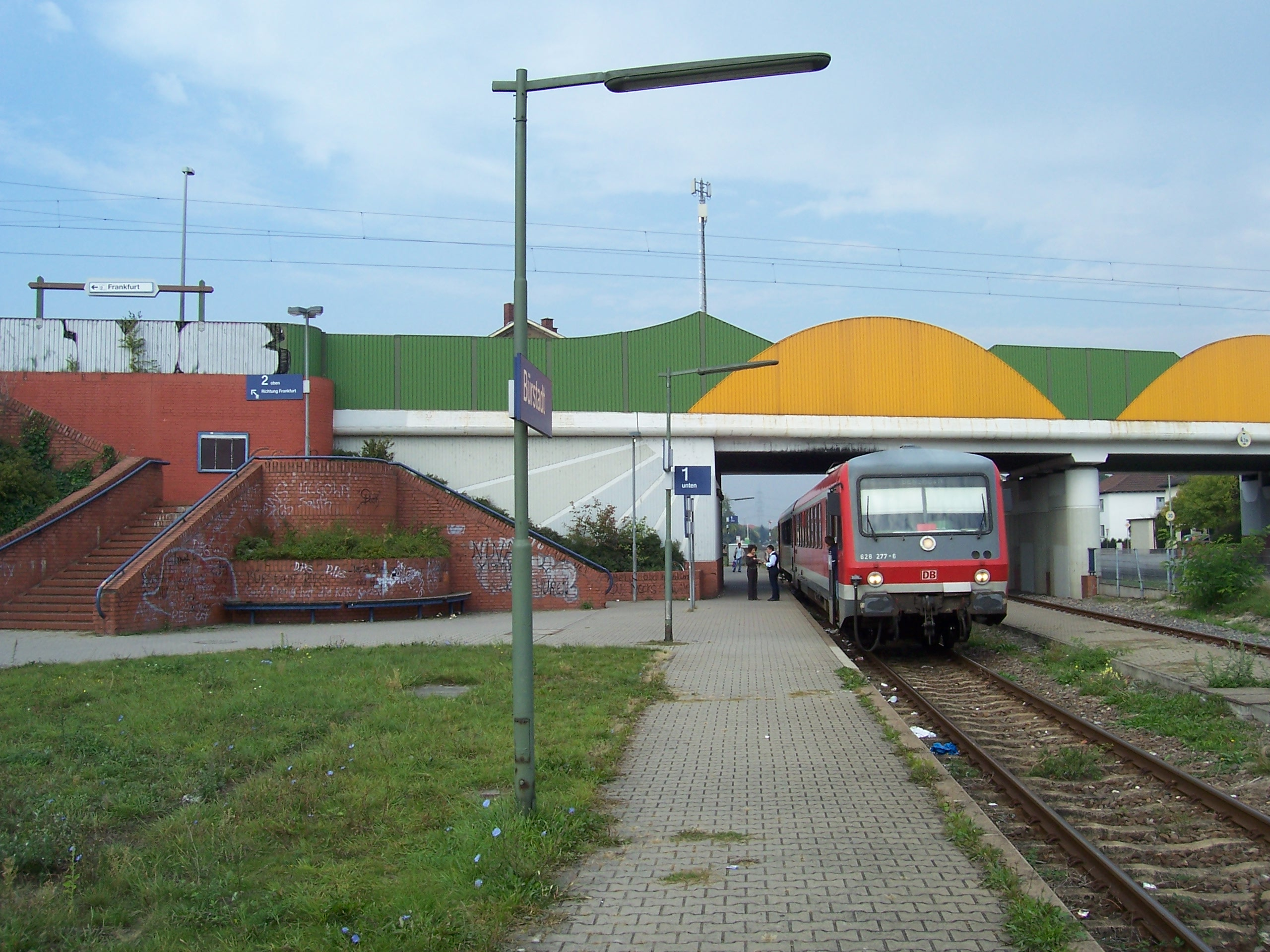
Bürstadt interchange station: Nibelung Railway below, Mannheim–Frankfurt railway above

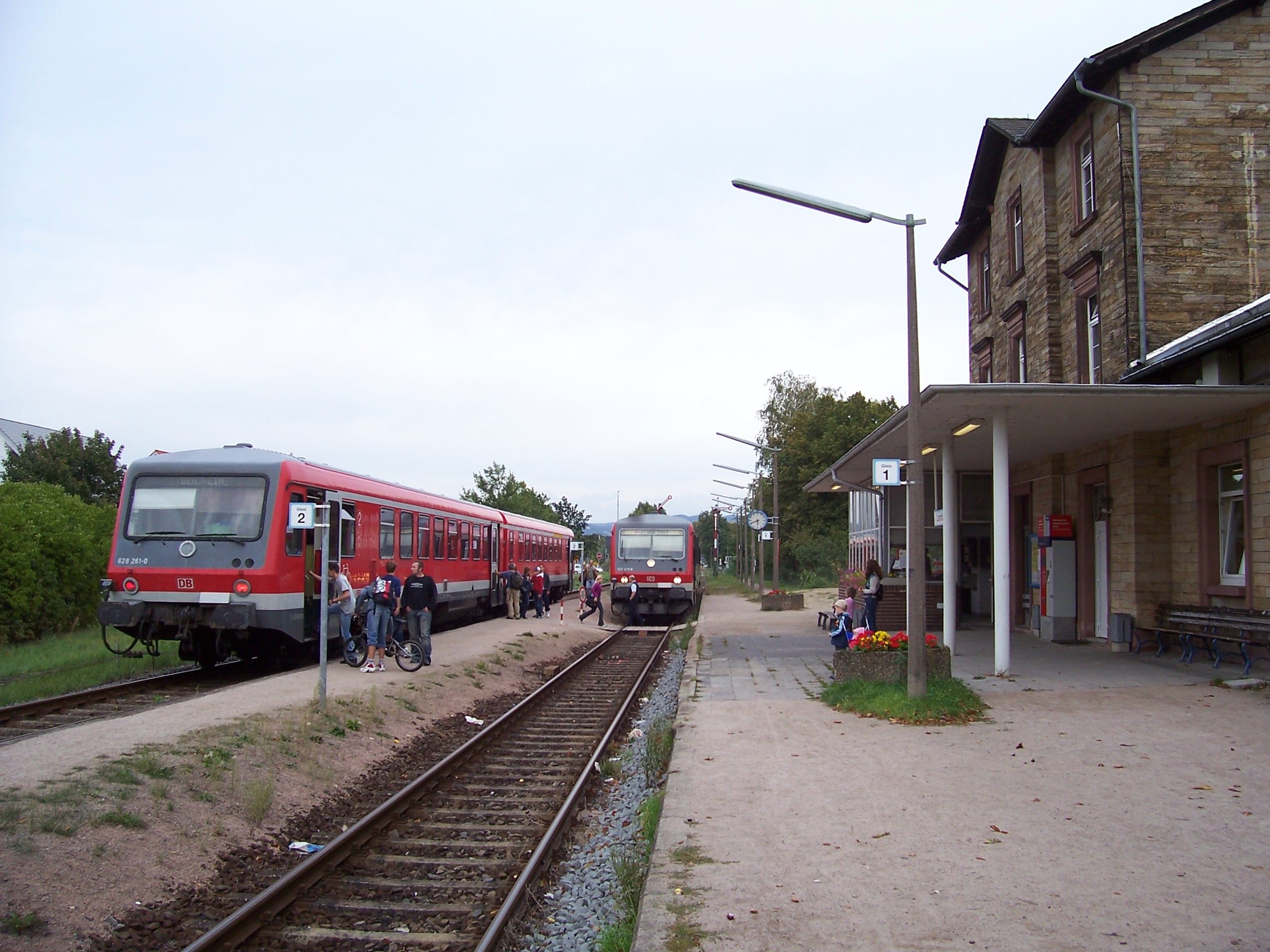
Lorsch station

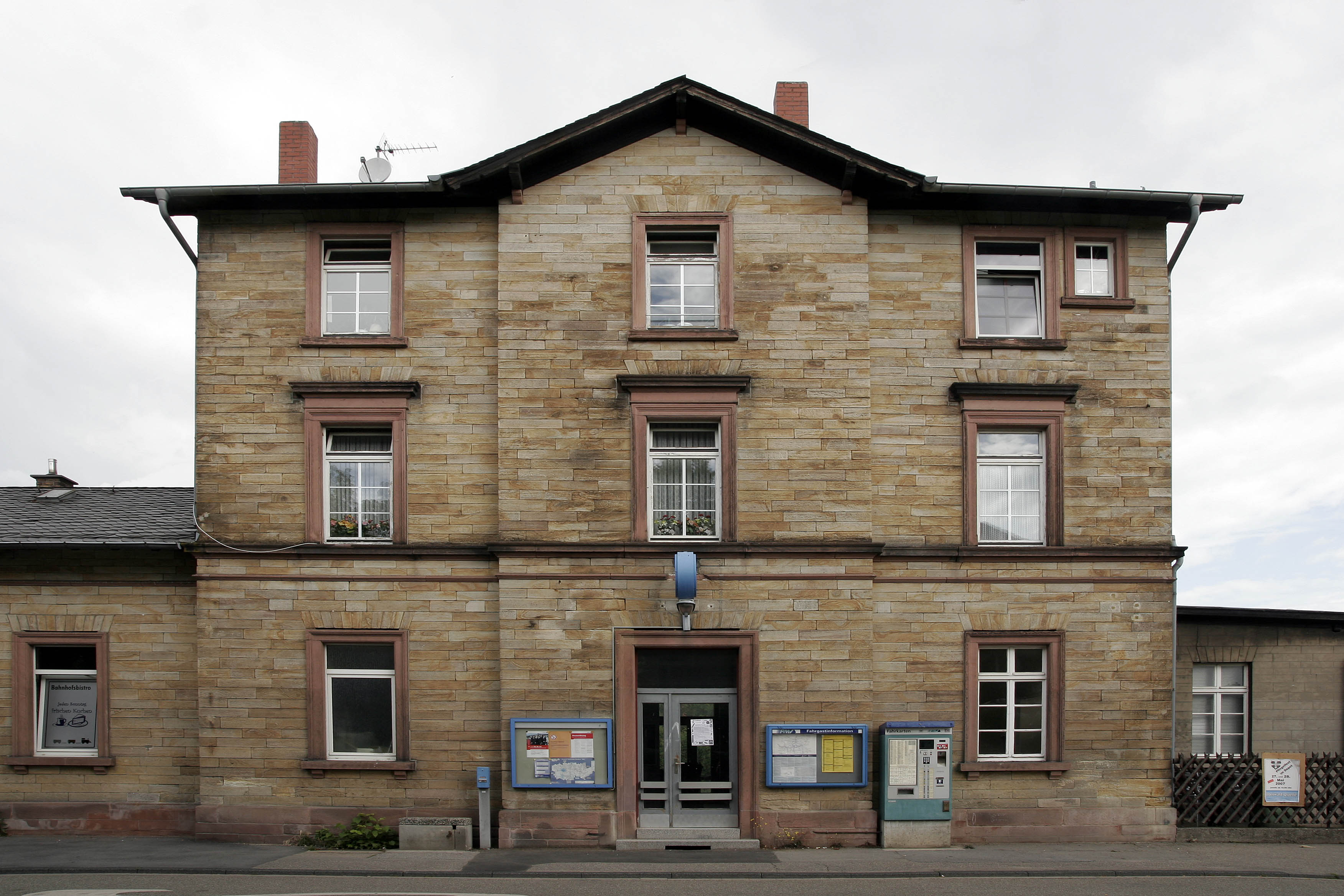
Lorsch station (street side)

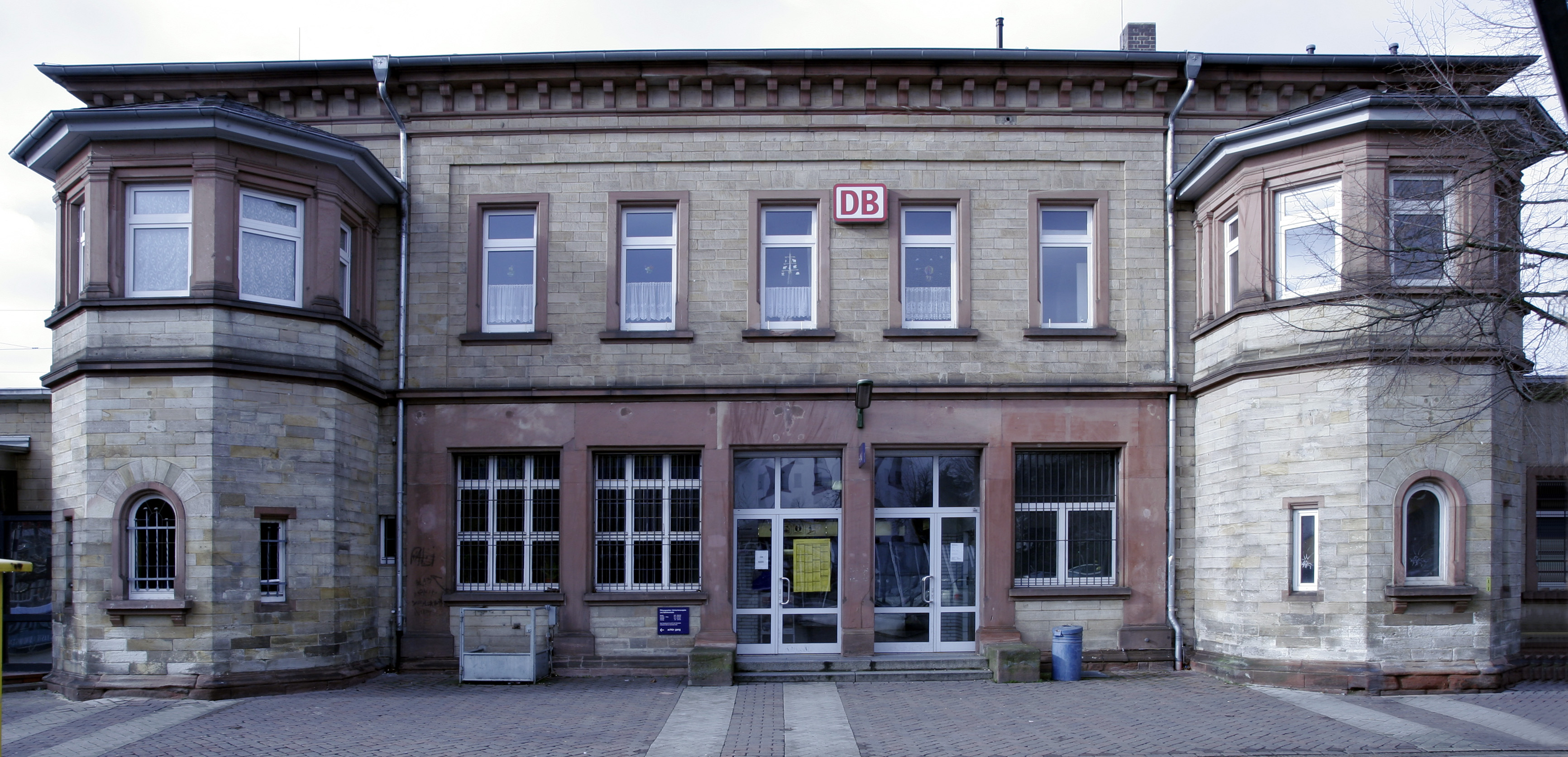
Bensheim station, the end of the Nibelung Railway
