= Frankfurt-Niederrad station =

Railway halt in Niederrad, Germany

Frankfurt Niederrad
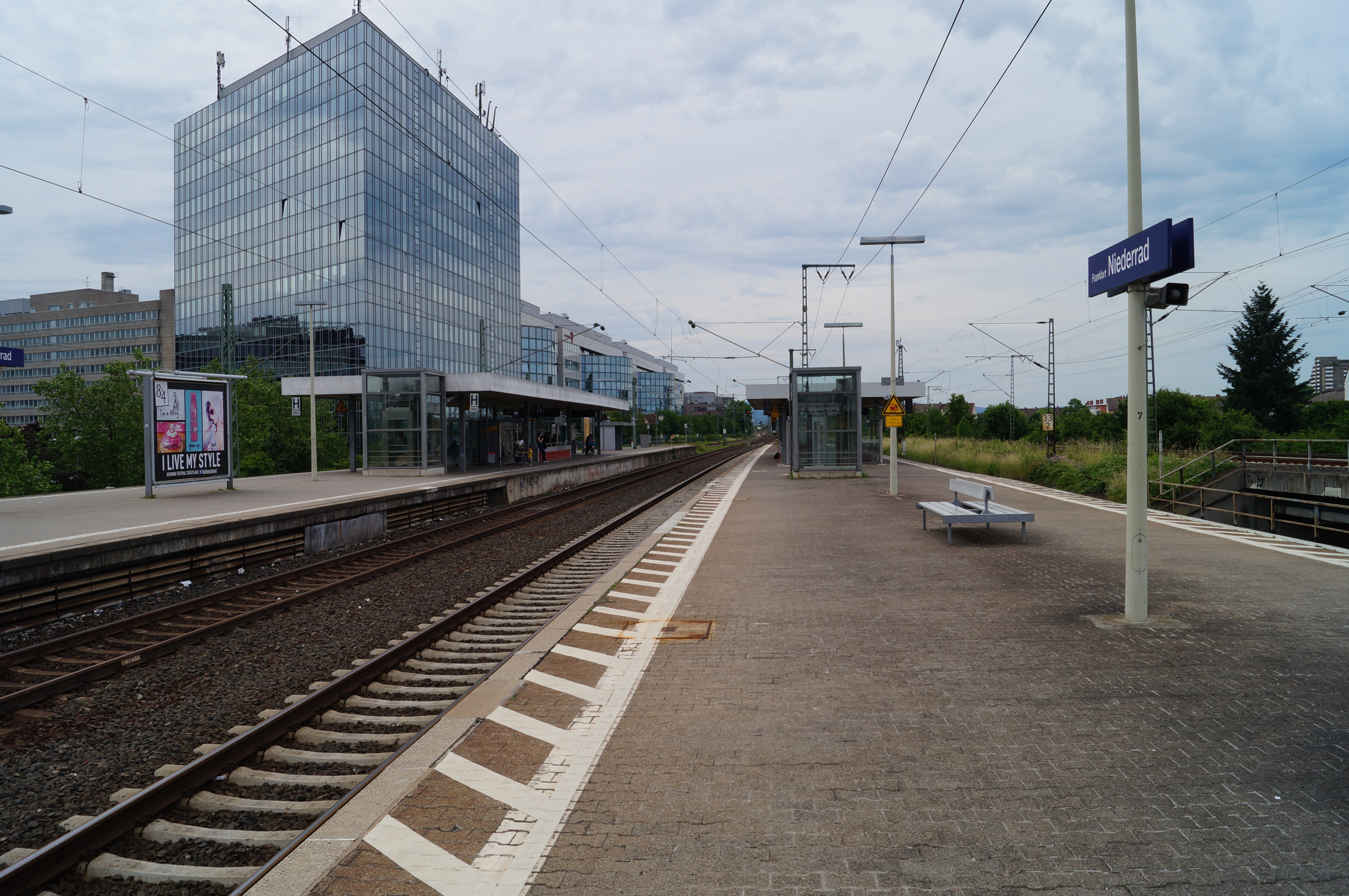
- Old station building, abandoned in 1977 with the construction of the S-Bahn

General information
- Location: Frankfurt am Main, Hesse; Germany
- Coordinates: 50°4′50″N 8°38′13″E
- Owner: Deutsche Bahn
- Operator: DB Netz; DB Station&Service
- Lines: Main Railway (KBS 471/KBS 645.8/645.9)
- Platforms: 2
- Tracks: 4

Construction
- Accessible: Yes

Other information
- Station code: 1876
- DS100 code: FNI
- IBNR: 8002050
- Category: 3
- Fare zone: : 5010
- Website: www.bahnhof.de

Services
| Preceding station | Rhine-Main S-Bahn | Following station |
|---|---|---|
| Frankfurt Stadion towards Riedstadt-Goddelau | S7 (Rhine-Main S-Bahn) | Frankfurt Hbf Terminus |
| Frankfurt Stadion towards Wiesbaden Hbf | S8 (Rhine-Main S-Bahn) | Frankfurt Hbf (tief) towards Hanau Hbf |
| Frankfurt Stadion towards Wiesbaden Hbf | S9 (Rhine-Main S-Bahn) | Frankfurt Hbf (tief) towards Hanau Hbf |
| Preceding station | DB Regio Mitte | Following station |
| Frankfurt Airport Regional towards Koblenz Hbf | RE 2 Südwest-Express | Frankfurt (Main) Hbf Terminus |
| Walldorf (Hess) towards Mannheim Hbf | RE 70 | Frankfurt (Main) Hbf Terminus |
| Preceding station | Vlexx | Following station |
| Frankfurt Airport Regional towards Saarbrücken Hbf | RE 3 | Frankfurt (Main) Hbf Terminus |
Location
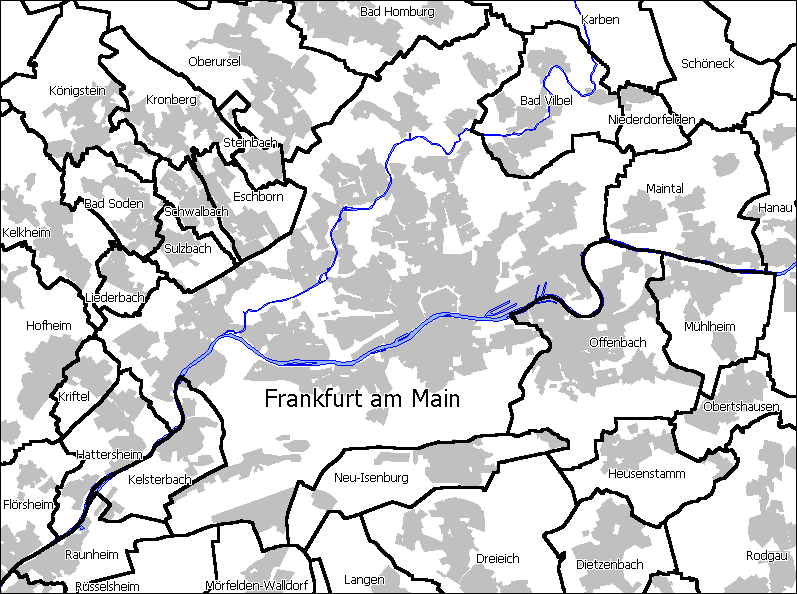
- Location within Frankfurt am Main Location within Hesse Location within Germany Location within Europe

Frankfurt-Niederrad station is a station in the district of Niederrad in the southwest of Frankfurt am Main in the German state of Hesse.

== Location ==
In 1977, during the building of the Rhine-Main S-Bahn, the former station building of Niederrad station was closed. The entrances to the S-Bahn station are located about 700 metres further south on Lyoner Straße. The station is rated by Deutsche Bahn as a category 3 station. It consists of four platform tracks on the Main Railway. It is located on an elevated position above Adolf-Miersch-Straße and Lyoner Straße. The two platforms are accessible from the street via lifts and stairs. All trains running through Frankfurt-Niederrad pass over the Main on either of the two Niederrad bridges located north of the station.

== Connections ==
The station is used by Regional-Express and Regionalbahn services and by lines S7, S8 and S9 of the Rhine-Main S-Bahn. Intercity and Intercity-Express services pass by on the Mannheim–Frankfurt railway without stopping. A few years ago some InterCity trains also stopped in the off-peak.

Underneath the station there are interchanges with tram lines 12 and 19 (runs only at certain times) and bus lines 78, 79 (runs only in the mornings and from Monday to Friday) and 84.

== Services ==
- RE 2 Frankfurt Hbf – Frankfurt-Niederrad – Frankfurt Airport – Rüsselsheim – Mainz Hbf – Bingen – Koblenz Hbf
- RE 3 Frankfurt Hbf – Frankfurt-Niederrad – Frankfurt Airport – Rüsselsheim – Mainz Hbf – Bad Kreuznach – Saarbrücken Hbf
- RE 70 Frankfurt Hbf – Frankfurt-Niederrad – Riedstadt-Goddelau – Gernsheim – Biblis – Mannheim Hbf
- Riedstadt-Goddelau – Frankfurt-Niederrad – Frankfurt Hbf
- Wiesbaden Hbf – Frankfurt-Niederrad – Frankfurt Hbf (tief) – Hanau Hbf
- Wiesbaden Hbf – Frankfurt-Niederrad – Frankfurt Hbf (tief) – Hanau Hbf
