= Frankfurt Stadion station =

Railway station in Germany

Frankfurt am Main Stadion
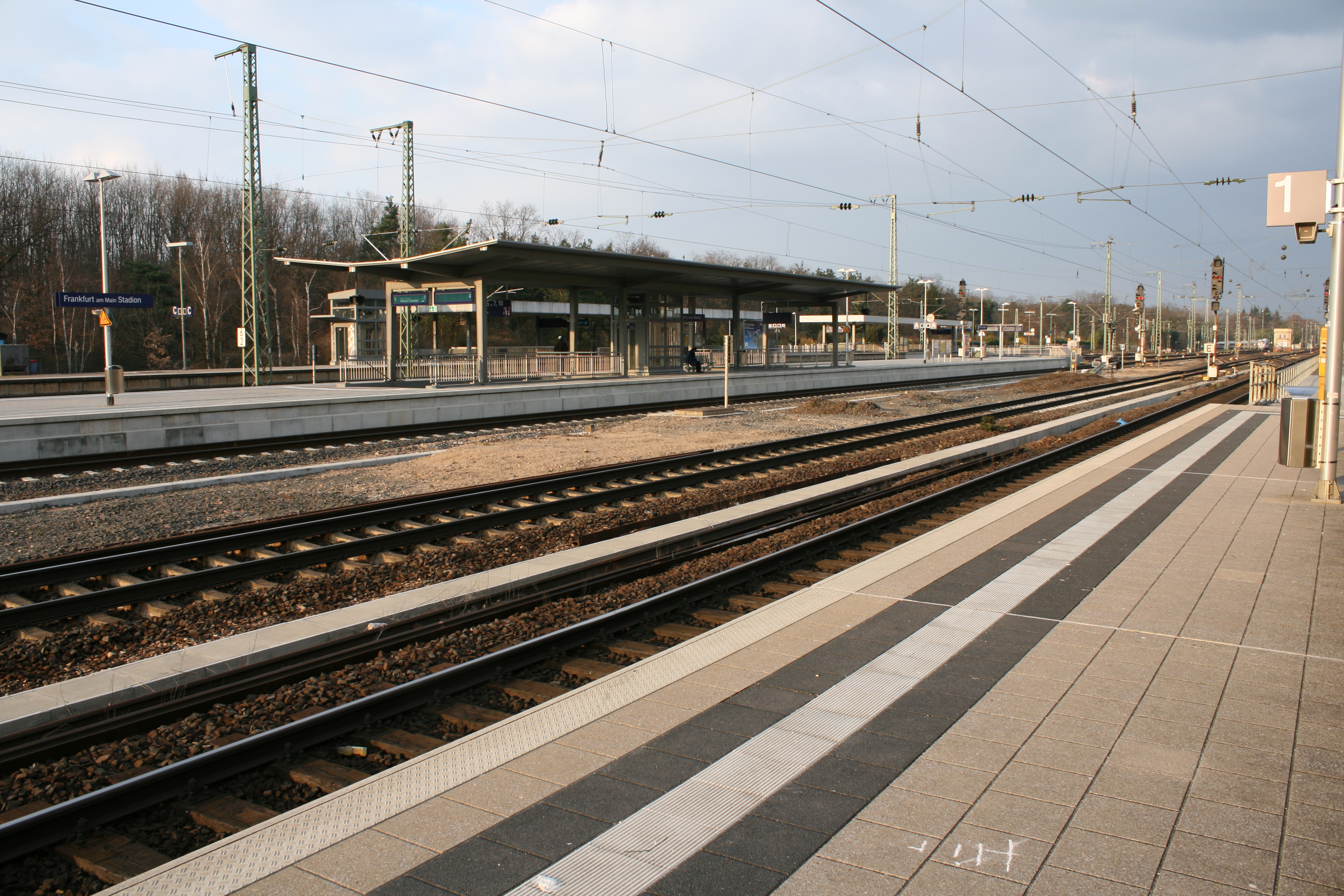

General information
- Location: Frankfurt, Hesse; Germany
- Coordinates: 50°4′5″N 8°37′59″E
- Owner: Deutsche Bahn
- Operator: DB Netz; DB Station&Service
- Lines: Main Railway (KBS 471/ KBS 645.8/645.9); Frankfurt Airport loop (KBS 645.8/645.9); Mannheim–Frankfurt (KBS 645.7/655)
- Platforms: 4
- Tracks: 6
- Train operators: S-Bahn Rhein-Main

Other information
- Station code: 1854
- DS100 code: FSP
- IBNR: 8002040
- Category: 3
- Fare zone: : 5082
- Website: www.bahnhof.de

History
- Opened: 1879

Services
Preceding station	Rhine-Main S-Bahn	Following station
Zeppelinheim towards Riedstadt-Goddelau	S7 (Rhine-Main S-Bahn)	Frankfurt-Niederrad towards Frankfurt Hbf
Gateway Gardens towards Wiesbaden Hbf	S8 (Rhine-Main S-Bahn)	Frankfurt-Niederrad towards Hanau Hbf
Gateway Gardens towards Wiesbaden Hbf	S9 (Rhine-Main S-Bahn)	Frankfurt-Niederrad towards Hanau Hbf
Location

Frankfurt am Main Stadion station (German: Bahnhof Frankfurt am Main Stadion) is a junction railway station in Frankfurt, Germany.

Stadion station is close to Frankfurt's main football stadium, the Deutsche Bank Park. Prior to 1937 it was called Frankfurt-Goldstein and from then until 24 December 2005 it was called Frankfurt-Sportfeld ("Sport field"). According to Deutsche Bahn it is used by 570 trains a day and is the busiest railway junction in Germany. The station is located about a kilometre from the stadium.

== Building ==
The station building was built in the standard style used by the Hessian Ludwig Railway from 1879 on the Main Railway (Mainbahn). The first section opened in 1863 between Bischofsheim and Goldstein. The two-story station building was constructed of yellow sandstone with a gabled roof. The design of the station building stresses the horizontal and has a broad cornice separating the storeys.

== Services ==
Stadion station is connected from the west by the Main Railway from Mainz Central Station and the line from Frankfurt Airport of the Rhine-Main S-Bahn and from south by the Mannheim–Frankfurt railway from Mannheim Central Station. Since the opening of the Cologne–Frankfurt high-speed rail line from Cologne Central Station, which connects with the Mannheim–Frankfurt railway, its traffic also runs through the node without stopping. The station is connected to the north with four tracks over the Niederrad Main bridges to Frankfurt Central Station and to the east with two tracks along the original route of the Main Railway to Frankfurt South station. The line to the east also connects with the Main-Neckar Railway to Darmstadt Central Station at the nearby Forsthaus junction.

== S-Bahn station ==
Stadion station was given the name because the S-Bahn station is about a kilometre on foot from the Frankfurt stadium, the Commerzbank-Arena. The station was considerably upgraded for the 2006 World Cup and now has two central platforms (four platform faces), an outer platform and a special terminal platform, which are connected by two tunnels. The pedestrian passages are designed to handle crowds for football matches. It is served by lines S7, S8, and S9.

== Construction ==
The first phase of the first stage of construction started in early 2005 and ended in April 2007. In June 2008, the electronic interlocking was put into operation. During the first stage the station was rebuilt with the new rail link between the Main and Ried railways on its western side and converted from a “wedge” station (Keilbahnhof) into a junction station. Work on the second phase of the first phase began in March 2008 and will run until the end of 2014. The entire first phase of the upgrade, which is estimated to cost a total of €78 million, will allow the realignment of the tracks in order to separate traffic flows.

A second phase, scheduled to begin in 2015, will eliminate bottlenecks and provide for the connection of the Frankfurt–Mannheim high-speed railway. This will include a new route between the station and Gutleuthof junction near Frankfurt Hauptbahnhof, which will pass under the single-track Niederrad–Forsthaus line north east of Stadion station. Long-distance traffic will therefore be focused in future of the south side of the Hauptbahnhof and regional traffic will be focused on the north side. The €120 million project will also include a third Niederrad bridge over the Main.

Under a third stage of the project, built as part of the Frankfurt–Mannheim high-speed line, new tracks will be laid between Stadion station and Zeppelinheim station and traffic to and from Mannheim will consequently be separated from traffic to and from the airport. In addition, a grade-separated connection will be built between the Ried Railway and the line connecting to the South Main line to Frankfurt South station for rail freight.
