= Frankfurt–Mannheim high-speed railway =

Railway line

Frankfurt-Mannheim high-speed railway

Overview
- Line number: 3657 (Frankfurt (Main) Stadion – Pfingstberg); 3658 (Zeppelinheim – Frankfurt (Main) Stadion)
- Locale: Baden-Württemberg and Hesse, Germany

Technical
- Line length: ~95 km (59 mi)
- Track gauge: 1,435 mm (4 ft 8 1/2 in) standard gauge
- Electrification: 15 kV/16.7 Hz AC overhead catenary
- Operating speed: 300 km/h (186 mph)

The Frankfurt–Mannheim high-speed railway (Neubaustrecke Rhein/Main–Rhein/Neckar) is a planned German high-speed railway between Frankfurt am Main and Mannheim.

The approximately 95 kilometre-long line with a top speed of up to 300 km/h (186 mph), would connect the existing Cologne–Frankfurt and Mannheim–Stuttgart high-speed lines, carrying long-distance passenger traffic and freight that now passes over the Mannheim–Frankfurt railway. It is also part of Axis No. 24 (Lyon/Genoa–Basel–Duisburg–Rotterdam/Antwerp) of the Trans-European Networks.

The line is listed as an "urgent need" in the Federal Transport Infrastructure Plan 2030 (Bundesverkehrswegeplan 2030).

The complete route was announced on 13 November 2020. From Zeppelinheim, the line will run along the A 5 and A 67 motorways, turn southwest at Lorsch and join the Mannheim–Frankfurt railway south of Lampertheim. Three branch lines will connect Darmstadt Hauptbahnhof and the Rhine-Main Railway.

On 30 November 2021, the planning approval application for the northern section, between Frankfurt and Darmstadt, was submitted and, after revisions, made available for public review in early 2025. The Bundestag was scheduled to be informed by the Federal Ministry for Transport in 2025 about the legally preferred route, time and cost plans, and the impacts on people and the environment. The commissioning of the new line is planned for "after 2030". The Ministry finally submitted the Report on the results of the preliminary planning and early public participation for the Frankfurt–Mannheim new line project to the Bundestag on 3 July 2026.

== History ==
The Rhine-Main and the Rhine-Neckar regions are two of the eleven metropolitan areas in Germany. They are connected by three railway lines, the Main-Neckar Railway, the Mainz–Ludwigshafen railway and the Mannheim–Frankfurt railway (Riedbahn).

The Riedbahn, which has been heavily used for years, has been considered overloaded since the commissioning of the Cologne–Frankfurt high-speed railway at the latest. Around 650 trains (as of 2007) run daily in the corridor between Mannheim and Frankfurt/Mainz; a further increase to about 900 train journeys per day was expected by 2015. In the late 1980s, the capacity of the old line was increased from 240 to 280 train movements per day. The long-distance, local and freight traffic causes regular delays on the double-track mixed traffic line. The line is in particular restrictive for long-distance traffic, as it includes the Biblis curve, which is limited to 90 km/h. In addition, there is an urgent need for additional local transport capacity to connect the densely populated area to the Rhine-Neckar S-Bahn.

The traffic forecast drawn up as part of the Federal Transport Infrastructure Plan 2003 predicted 32.8 million passenger journeys per year on the Frankfurt-Mannheim section and 17.0 million on the Mannheim–Stuttgart section in 2015. Freight traffic between Frankfurt and Mannheim would have then been 56.16 million tonnes per year, distributed over both lines.

=== Planning ===
==== 1993–2004: Pre-planning up to the completion of the regional planning procedure ====
The project, which has been at the planning stage since 1993, was originally scheduled to go into operation in 2007. In the spring of 1998, Deutsche Bahn carried out an internal examination of the option of building a new line, instead of a then planned upgrade of the Riedbahn. An early draft in 1998 proposed a line from Frankfurt Airport, going along the motorway as far as Weiterstadt. From there, the line would run to Hauptbahnhof Darmstadt and then rejoin the motorway in the south of the Darmstadt urban area.

As part of the South Hesse Integrated Planning (Integrierten Planung Südhessen), operational investigations were carried out to increase capacity between Frankfurt and Mannheim from 1997 to 1999. The trigger for this was the new Cologne–Frankfurt high-speed railway opened in 2002, which was expected to result in additional traffic as well as the expected expansion of regional services. It showed that a four-track upgrade of the existing lines would not be possible. As a result, further investigations assumed the construction of a new line.

The preliminary planning for the new line started at the end of 1998 or the beginning of 1999. In May 1999, DB commissioned an accounting firm to reassess the project. In addition, the Mottgers link, Frankfurt 21 and Stuttgart 21 were part of the package analysed. It was one of two new construction projects listed in DB's Network 21 (Netz 21) strategy adopted in 1999.

At the beginning of 2000, Deutsche Bahn announced plans for the new line to bypass Mannheim Hauptbahnhof. The line would therefore pass about five kilometres east of the city and would connect at Schwetzingen with the high-speed line to Stuttgart. Mannheim would be connected via a junction in the area of the Viernheim triangle autobahn interchange. The original approval documents, which provided for a connection to Mannheim, were withdrawn, and the regional planning procedure was stopped at the end of February 2000. The DB justified this step with problems with the connection with Mannheim and at first took no further position. In March 2000, Deutsche Bahn CEO Hartmut Mehdorn, announced that after the completion of the new line, no fewer trains than at present would stop at Mannheim Hauptbahnhof. The CEO described the ensuing dispute over the connection to Mannheim as bordering on "hysteria" in May 2000. Deutsche Bahn presented two possible routes, including one running through Mannheim Hauptbahnhof, to the Karlsruhe regional administration as part of a first scoping stage on 30 October 2000. After this first discussion, the regional planning procedure could be initiated.

As part of the preliminary design, numerous options were examined. In early 2002, the board of Deutsche Bahn decided to initiate the regional planning procedure for the new line with an option following autobahns 5, 67 and 6. This option has proved to be the cheapest; it would enable the highest traffic growth and would be the most environmentally and economically viable option. The 75 kilometre route would allow the journey time between Frankfurt and Stuttgart to be reduced from 79 to 60 minutes. At the same time, improvements would be made to regional transport operations on the existing route. For the Mannheim area, alternatives with a bypass of Mannheim (option A) and with an additional bypass (option B) were introduced. DB did not include a station on the bypass. On 18 April 2002, representatives of Deutsche Bahn confirmed that the company was continuing with its application for the implementation of the regional planning procedure (Raumordnungsverfahren). In 2002 it was still expected that planning approval would be given in 2004 and it would be opened at the end of 2008.

Due to a lack of funding, a pause in the development of the €1.9 billion project was planned after the completion of the regional planning procedure at the end of 2004. According to a media report, the estimated expenditure of €16.5 million, which would have been necessary for a continuation of the plans, could not be funded. By then, about €30 million had been invested in the project.

The regional planning procedure was carried out from 1999 to 2004 and the planning approval procedures were to run from 2007 to 2011. The Regierungsbezirks (district governments) of Darmstadt and Karlsruhe are in charge of the consultation process.

The regional planning procedure for the southern section ended on 18 May 2004 with the handover of the spatial planning assessment for the Baden-Württemberg section of the route. In particular, it was unclear whether the bypass of Hauptbahnhof Mannheim (bypass solution) could be achieved; in this solution, some freight and long-distance trains would bypass Mannheim without stopping. The massive protests from the region as well as the states of Baden-Württemberg, Rhineland-Palatinate and the Saarland resulted in the project development lasting for years.

==== 2004–2016: continuing unresolved planning and political conflict ====
An agreement was reached on the route for the connection to Darmstadt at the end of January 2007 and the planned route in Hesse was presented at the beginning of May of the same year. Deutsche Bahn called Europe-wide tenders for the carrying out of environmental planning support planning at the end of April 2007. This was required to last at least one growing season and was a prerequisite for the initiation of the zoning procedure.

It was planned to record the occurrence of more than 500 animal and plant species on an area of 20,000 hectares in a corridor up to 1000 metre-wide along the planned route. Further investigation was required on sections of the route that passed through Natura 2000 areas. The data was to be used to draw up a landscape management plan, which would define ecological compensatory measures for land consumed. The detailed technical planning was to be awarded in August. This would include the detailed routing.

A working group on the Baden-Württemberg section of new line, initiated by minister president Günther Oettinger, was due to commence operations at the beginning of September 2007. The minister president and the cabinet spoke in favour of a connection to Mannheim Hauptbahnhof and against a bypass. At a hearing with the Federal Railway Authority to prepare the environmental impact assessment of the southern sector, representatives from the region around Mannheim also reaffirmed their rejection of a bypass of Mannheim Hauptbahnhof.

In mid-September 2007, Deutsche Bahn AG awarded a contract for the technical planning. The contract, which would also determine the exact route, had a value of €7.5 million. Among other things, noise protection and train control and safety systems would be planned in detail within this framework. As late as 2007, large-scale construction was planned to begin in 2011 with the project to become operational in 2017. The section of new line between Neu-Isenburg-Zeppelinheim and Mannheim-Waldhof and Mannheim-Pfingstberg would be 77 kilometres-long. The existing, double-track railway between Frankfurt-Stadion and Neu-Isenburg-Zeppelinheim (five km) would be increased to four tracks. About eight km of the high-speed line would run through twelve tunnels. The project would involve a total of about 100 road and 30 railway bridges. Over a length of about 19 km the line was to run in "trough structures" (that is with support walls and a solid base), with a length of about seven km in tunnels (all data: as of June 2007). In 2009, it was planned to start the first preparatory measures for the new line as of 2011 and a financing agreement was concluded to that effect. Construction would take six years according to plans from 2007. The railway was expected to have a construction cost of about €2 billion in 2007.

In February 2008, DB AG called Europe-wide tenders for the preliminary design and approval planning. In December 2008, Deutsche Bahn AG initiated the planning approval for a 13 km-long (8.1 mi) section between Frankfurt Stadion station and the municipal limits of Mörfelden and Erzhausen. This section included an upgrade of the existing Riedbahn to four tracks and the construction of an island platform in Zeppelinheim station. The section was discussed at a public hearing and published in 2009. Deutsche Bahn expected in July 2010 that the planning approval decision would be made at the beginning of 2011. After some changes to the plan, the planning documents for the section were rewritten in September 2010. At the end of July 2017, this planning approval procedure was terminated at the request of DB Netz AG.

As of mid-2010, the planning approval procedure for the eleven-kilometre section between Gernsheim and Einhausen was due to begin in late 2010/early 2011. The planning approval procedure for the 22 km-long (14 mi) section between Darmstadt and Mannheim was to commence in the first half of 2011.

In the course of the review of the federal railway needs plan, which was presented in 2010, the federal government indicated that it considered that there was still room for improvement with regard to the project layout. The cost-benefit ratio was estimated in the report at 1.2 (benefits of €2.212 billion compared to costs of €1.683 billion) and was thus just above the minimum for an economically worthwhile project. Furthermore, the report notes that not all capacity constraints in the Rhine-Main/Rhine-Neckar area would be eliminated by the new line. Above all, the section between Darmstadt Hbf and Mannheim-Friedrichsfeld was expected to remain a bottleneck with a capacity utilisation of more than 110%. In January 2011, Deutsche Bahn, according to its own information, was still in the process of testing the developed route on behalf of the Federal Ministry of Transport. The examination process would be completed in autumn 2011.

On 15 March 2012, the Ministry of Transport presented the 2011–2015 investment framework for federal transport infrastructure (Investitionsrahmenplan 2011–2015 für die Verkehrsinfrastruktur des Bundes). The new line was listed in it under "other important projects that generally start after 2015".

In early 2012, the Federal Ministry of Transport commissioned a study to develop an overall transport concept for the railway corridor and to submit proposals for development measures. The first results showed that a new line between Frankfurt and Mannheim was still indispensable. The planning of the new line should therefore be further developed with a view to increasing capacity and additional freight traffic. The final results of the study were expected in mid-2013. Deutsche Bahn then wanted to initiate the optimisation of the planning at short notice. The submission of the full report was expected in mid-2014 to occur in autumn 2014. The reviewers recommended in March 2015 that the best solution would be a new line parallel to the A 5 and A 67 motorways.

The revision of the planning was also foreseen in consultation processes. On 21 July 2014, the commissioned company, Intraplan, presented the first results of the Korridorstudie Mittelrhein (Middle Rhine corridor study). The study recommended a mixed traffic route along the A 5 and A 67 motorways. The line would be used by faster passenger traffic during the day and by freight traffic at night. There would be different options for the integration of the line into Mannheim Hauptbahnhof. The full opinion was originally expected to be presented in autumn 2014, followed by a public consultation phase before a decision was taken on the Federal Transport Infrastructure Plan 2030 (Bundesverkehrswegeplan 2030) by mid-2015. It was then planned that the results would be available by the end of 2014 (as of November 2014). The initiation of the first planning approval procedure was planned for 2017 (as of January 2016).

The line was due to be opened in 2015.

==== From 2016: Federal Transport Infrastructure Plan 2030 and resumption of planning ====
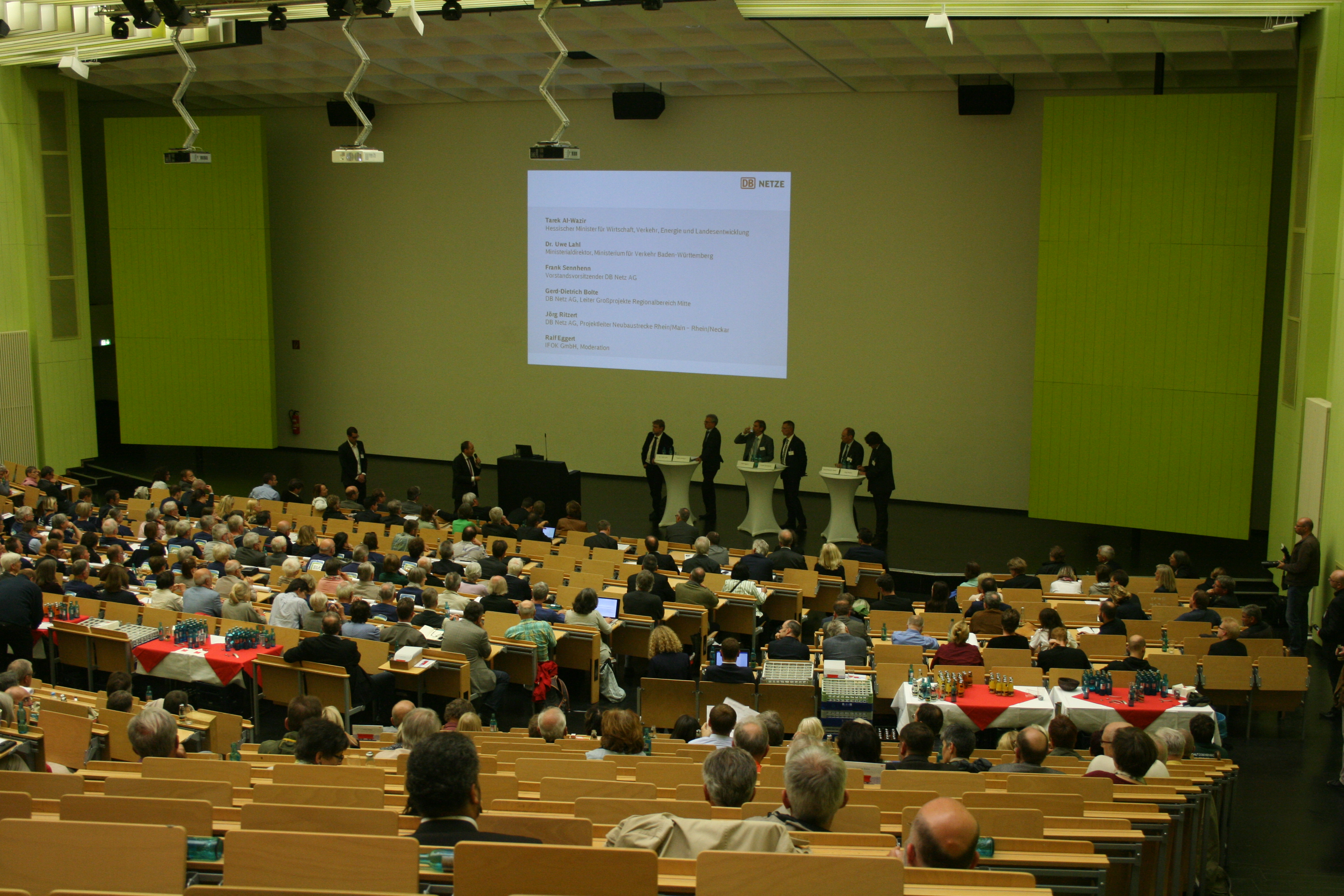
Event marking the resumption of the planning of the Rhine/Main–Rhine/Neckar high-speed line in the large auditorium of the Technical University of Darmstadt.

A public consultation phase took place during 2015 in preparation for the determination of the 2030 Federal Transport Infrastructure Plan. The state of Baden-Württemberg listed the project, with full integration of Mannheim Hauptbahnhof, in the Federal Transport Infrastructure Plan 2015 (later renamed the Federal Transport Infrastructure Plan 2030). The investment of €220 million was planned in Baden-Württemberg. The "NBS Rhein/Main – Rhein/Neckar" project was listed in the "draft proposals" in the Federal Transport Infrastructure Plan 2015 of 5 May 2014 on the "(Frankfurt am Main Stadion –) Zeppelinheim – Mannheim-Waldhof" route with a top speed of 300 km/h (186 mph). The Federal Transport Infrastructure Plan 2030 was adopted by the Federal Cabinet on 3 August 2016.

Deutsche Bahn and the ministries of transport of Hesse and Baden-Württemberg presented a roadmap for future planning at the Technical University of Darmstadt on 30 September 2016. According to the Rhein-Neckar-Zeitung, the interest in this event was "enormous". Representatives of more than 20 citizens' initiative movements fighting against noise between Hockenheim and the Hessian mountain road were present. In particular, the route in the Lorsch–Viernheim–Mannheim triangle was still very controversial. Mannheim mayor Peter Kurz had decided to oppose an above-ground route in the Mannheim urban area.

Five new working groups of the planning process (inter alia "Traffic concept" and "Darmstadt and surroundings route") began their work in the first quarter of 2017. Working Group 2 on "Transport concept" met in Lampertheim on 26 February 2018. In addition to the concept favoured by Deutsche Bahn of a double-track new line used during the day by long-distance passenger trains and at night by freight trains, three other concepts were discussed:

1. a new line as a pure freight line,
2. a new line for mixed traffic during the day including an overtaking loop,
3. a four-track new line.

In May 2018, Deutsche Bahn continued to favour a new double-track line that would be used during the day for long-distance traffic and at night for freight traffic. The citizens' initiative BI NOBL strongly supported a new line with four tracks.

In the middle of 2018, the planning approval procedure for the Zeppelinheim–Darmstadt section was planned to be completed in the same year, with the commissioning to take place in 2028. At the end of 2018, the route option was scheduled to be selected in 2019 and the planning approval process would then be initiated for the Zeppelinheim–Darmstadt section.

In the middle of 2018, it was planned to complete the preliminary planning for the Darmstadt area (planning approval section 2) in mid-2019 and to initiate the planning approval procedure in 2022. For the Pfungstadt–Lorsch section (PFA 3 and 4), the technical planning of the new line (together with an upgrade of the A 67 motorway to 6 lanes) was to be updated by the end of 2018 and the planning approval procedure was to be initiated in 2019. For the Lorsch–Mannheim section (PFA 5 and 6), the alignment was still pending with the selection of the route expected to take place at the beginning of 2019 and the planning approval documents to be submitted in 2022.

=== Impact ===
After the commissioning of the new line, the capacity of the existing line would be sufficient to allow the increase of services on the S-Bahn line 7 to Groß-Gerau from every half-hour to every quarter of an hour and to connect with the planned Terminal 3 of Frankfurt Airport. Operation of the first stage of the new terminal is scheduled to begin in 2021.

A regional service designated as the Hessenexpress would connect Wiesbaden (via the Wallau link) with Frankfurt airport. An extension via Darmstadt to Mannheim is under consideration. The line is to pass under or over the A3. This could be done as part of a planned upgrade of the Wiesbaden motorway junction. The planning approval procedure is to be initiated in 2020. The Hessenexpress is to operate from 2025. After the scheduled start of operations on the northern section (Zeppelinheim–Darmstadt) of the new line in 2028, the service would be extended to Darmstadt.

The first German clock-face timetable concept presented in October 2018 envisages two and a half trains per hour and direction on the line between the two main stations, a travel time of 29 minutes with 300 km/h (186 mph) high-speed trains and a travel time of 31 minutes with 250 km/h high-speed trains. Between Frankfurt Airport and Mannheim there would be a half-hourly service with 250 or 300 km/h (155 or 186 mph) fast trains with a travel time of 26 and 27 minutes, respectively. The second draft report submitted in May 2019 provides for three train pairs per hour.

== Planned route ==
Two options were investigated in Baden-Württemberg and five in Hesse during the regional planning procedure.

The route is considered highly controversial. While a consensus was found for the northern section of the line in Hesse (56 km) at the beginning of 2007, negotiations on the southern section in Baden-Württemberg (29 km) continue.

=== Hesse ===
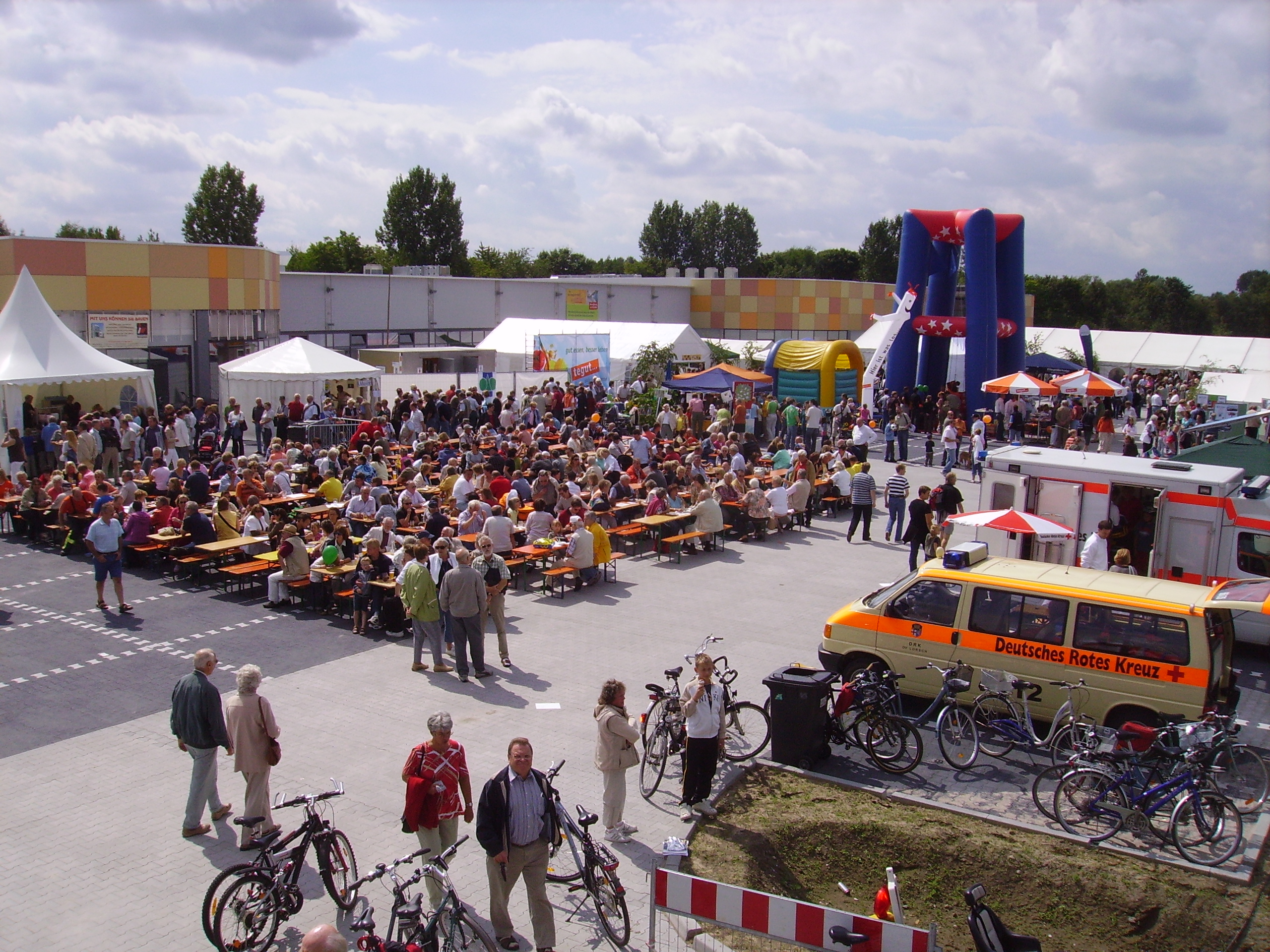
10,000 people on 24 August 2008 at the citizens' festival Die Bergstraße macht mobil ("the mountain road makes mobile") in Lorsch supporting a proposal for the new line in that area to go through a 11.9 kilometre-long tunnel.

The route would run between Frankfurt Stadion station and Neu-Isenburg-Zeppelinheim parallel to the old line. The project includes the construction of a third stage of Frankfurt Stadion station.

The five routes investigated in the northern section (Hesse) were:

- Option I: a direct route between Mannheim and Frankfurt without intermediate stops. Deutsche Bahn emphasised that even if this option was implemented, Darmstadt would remain connected to the long-distance network via the Main-Neckar Railway. The cost of this option, including the quadruplication between Frankfurt-Stadion and Zeppelinheim, was estimated at €1.2 billion in 2004 values.
- Option II: a similar route to option I, but with a newly built long-distance station called Darmstadt West in the Siedlung Tann area. The estimated additional costs compared to option I in 2009 was €100 million (in 2009 values).
- Options III/IV: a route through the city of Darmstadt and the Hauptbahnhof. The estimated additional cost of option III compared to option I in 2001 was €135 million (as of the regional planning procedure in 2001). In this option, noise protection measures were recommended over a length of about 8.2 km. The number of people affected by new construction noise was specified in the regional planning procedure to be 79,740. The estimated additional costs of option IV compared to option I in 2004 amounted to €300 million. Noise protection measures with a length of 9.9 km were recommended for this option; the number of people affected by new construction noise was stated as 120,300 in the regional planning procedure.
- Option V: the connection of Darmstadt Hauptbahnhof by means of a double track connection to the new line. In the context of the preparation of the Federal Transport Infrastructure Plan 2003, this option was assigned the greatest economic benefits. Another advantage is that the nighttime freight traffic in this solution would bypass Darmstadt. The number of long-distance trains corresponds to those of options III/IV.

Due to the greater length of the track, the land consumption of options III and IV is greater than that of options I and II. For options I and II, soundproofing measures of just 6.3 km in length were recommended as part of a noise analysis; the number of citizens affected was stated in the regional planning procedure at 65,940. Furthermore, option II with a long-distance Darmstadt West station would have greater economic returns than options III and IV, which would entail high expenditures for engineering structures and soundproofing measures.

Deutsche Bahn originally favoured option I, while the Hessian state government and the affected districts favoured options III/IV. In all options, the rest of the route runs next to motorways for its whole length.

At a press conference on 2 February 2007 in Darmstadt, the DB CEO Hartmut Mehdorn, the Hessian Minister of Economics Alois Rhiel, Darmstadt Lord Mayor Walter Hoffmann and district council leaders Alfred Jakoubek (Darmstadt-Dieburg) and Matthias Wilkes (Bergstraße) for the Hessian part of the route called for the so-called consensus or bundled route. This starts after the existing underground connection with the Cologne-Frankfurt high-speed railway south of the Frankfurter Kreuz and runs on the eastern side parallel to the A5. After Darmstädter Kreuz (Darmstadt motorway interchange), the line follows the A 67 and crosses the motorway at Lorsch to continue on the western side of the motorway. According to Deutsche Bahn information, the city of Darmstadt would be relieved of over 210 daily trains, including up to 40 freight trains at night. Deutsche Bahn tested a route along the A 5 and analysed it for environmental noise. Since the option favoured by Deutsche Bahn along the A 67 was also compatible with land use planning, the route was considered to commit "no breach of law".

The Bund für Umwelt und Naturschutz Deutschland criticised the route for touching several flora and fauna habitats and bird reserves.

In an interview on 15 September 2006, Oliver Kraft, DB Netz's board member responsible for investments, threatened to suspend planning at the end of 2006 if Darmstadt and Mannheim continued to insist on all trains stopping in these cities. At the same time, he offered to support a connection to Darmstadt Hauptbahnhof.

In April 2008, district administrator Matthias Wilkes of Bergstraße presented a feasibility study, according to which a tunnel through the Hessian Ried was cheaper than the ground-level route favoured by DB. The study also emphasised the fact that such a tunnel would reduce noise pollution and would not disrupt the Natura 2000 site. The Bergstraße district supported a route for the new line to the west of the A 67 from 2008.

In March 2019, around 2,000 people demonstrated against a route in the southern Hessian town of Lampertheim that would turn off directly south of Lorsch towards Mannheim and run firstly through the Lampertheim forest. The protesters feared that high-quality arable land would be destroyed and that it would cut through a game-rich forest. This route option was added to Deutsche Bahn planning as option "Mannheim Direct" or "option E" in November 2019.

==== Darmstadt Bypass ====
The bypass of Darmstadt Hauptbahnhof was also controversial. This option was originally rejected in the regional planning procedure. Both a bypass of Darmstadt and a direct connection to Darmstadt Hauptbahnhof without a bypass had been discussed. However, a direct connection would not only have been the most expensive option, it would also have caused the greatest environmental impact. According to DB information, however, the land used would be comparatively low for the planned option.

Introduced in February 2007, the consensus route (Konsenstrasse) was intended to run from the high-speed line into Darmstadt and connect Darmstadt Hauptbahnhof via a single-track loop to the new line. This line would branch off between Weiterstadt-Riedbahn and the Täubcheshöhle nature reserve towards the Hauptbahnhof and reconnect in the area of Kelley Barracks (near Pfungstadt) south of the Darmstadt interchange. The southern entry and exit is to be operated at up to 200 km/h and the northern at up to 160 km/h. In this option, the majority of the long-distance trains that currently run over the Riedbahn would bypass Darmstadt. In addition, Deutsche Bahn has contractually agreed that at least one ICE service per hour and direction would stop in Darmstadt Hauptbahnhof.

The 13 km-long connection from Darmstadt Hauptbahnhof was considered structurally complicated, as several major roads and land formerly used by the US Army and areas protected under Natura 2000 have to be crossed. Compared to option V, the number of tracks has been reduced from two to one. Residents of areas next to the link feared additional noise and called for the construction of a station on the new line outside the centre of Darmstadt.

At the end of March 2009, the mayor of Darmstadt surprisingly announced that he could no longer pursue the bypass option, which would cost up to €112 million, and instead opted for a long-distance station on the new line. Such a station would probably have had to be underground. According to DB information such a station would have been served by more ICE services than the Hauptbahnhof if served by a connection. This option would also have the lowest impact on the environment. According to DB information, such an external station was investigated at the request of the city of Darmstadt. Since only the connection to Darmstadt Hauptbahnhof is part of the Federal Transport Infrastructure Plan, such a long-distance station would have to be financed from Deutsche Bahn's own funds. According to recent calculations, the solution favoured by the city of Darmstadt along Eschollbrücker Straße would have cost €103 million built in a trough structure or €112 million in a tunnel. A ground-level option was calculated to cost €67.6 million.

In mid-January 2010, Deutsche Bahn submitted a report in which a Darmstadt West long-distance station (Fernbahnhof) was considered feasible and useful. Accordingly, the travel time between the proposed long-distance station and the Hauptbahnhof by tram would have been 20 minutes under ideal conditions. At the end of August 2010, the city's Transport and Environment Committees drew up a proposal to connect Darmstadt with the new line only to the north, which would support a shuttle service to Frankfurt Airport. Darmstadt City Council finally also called for a full connection to the Hauptbahnhof at the direction of the new Darmstadt Mayor Jürgen Partsch.

A "North connection of Darmstadt Hbf to the new line" was included in the "draft of project proposals" for the Federal Transport Infrastructure Plan 2015 of 5 May 2014. According to this draft, a "rail connection from Terminal 3 of Frankfurt Airport" is also planned.

The Middle Rhine Corridor Study (Korridorstudie Mittelrhein), which was submitted in March 2015, proposed various options for connecting Darmstadt Hauptbahnhof. Such connections were not economically justifiable just to enable ICE stops, since the advantages for passengers entering and exiting at Darmstadt would be outweighed by disadvantages for passengers passing through Darmstadt. A northern connection to the Hauptbahnhof could be justified with fast regional trains to Frankfurt Airport, which could cover the route in 13 minutes. A southern connection would be economical if it were used by freight trains and avoided a planned connecting curve for freight trains at Weiterstadt.

At the beginning of January 2016, talks about the Darmstadt connection were well advanced according to the Hessian Minister of Transport Tarek Al-Wazir, although the exact routing had not been determined.

The German clock-face timetable concept presented in October 2018 assumes a southern connection between Darmstadt and the new line.

=== Baden-Württemberg ===
Three options are being discussed for the route in Baden-Württemberg and nearby Hesse—the route between Lorsch and Mannheim runs largely through Hessian territory:

- Under Option A, the line would take a 90-degree curve to the west at the end of the A 67 before running along the A 6. The route then makes another 90-degree curve to the south and connects to the Mannheim–Frankfurt railway at a junction in Sandhofen.
- Under Option B (bypass of Mannheim), the line would run south from the Viernheim triangle interchange along the A 6 and change to the east side of the motorway north of Wallstadt. The line would then cross the Neckar, the A 656 and the Mannheim marshalling yard. The line would connect with the Mannheim–Stuttgart high-speed railway in the Pfingstberg tunnel.
- Lothar Mark, a federal member of parliament, put forward Option C (also called the Mark Option and called the Mannheim direct option by DB) which would involve a route running from Lorsch diagonally through the forest. This option was favoured by Deutsche Bahn in March 2009.

In the regional planning decision of May 2004, the regional council of Karlsruhe rejected option B, which was preferred by DB. Deutsche Bahn objected that only the concerns of the region had been taken into account, while the transport policy goals of the new project went far beyond the region.

As recently as September 2007, it was planned to initiate the planning approval procedures for the southern section of the Hessian line by the end of 2008. At the end of November 2009, the ICE corridor through the Bergsträße district (ICE-Trassenführung auf Bergsträßer Gemarkungen) working group (which included the affected Bergstraße district, community groups and conservation organisations) stated that a majority wanted the new line to run west of the A 67 motorway. This decision was supported by a new legal opinion, according to which Option C required a completely new regional planning procedure. The nature conservation associations BUND and NABU represented in the working group did not support either options A or C. They preferred the longest possible underground route and opposed the removal of EU protected status from areas that would obstruct a desired route.

In November 2010, environmental associations from Hesse and Baden-Württemberg for the first time jointly advocated route option C as the more environmentally friendly option. In contrast to option A, it would be possible to avoid forest fragmentation with a cut-and-cover tunnel. The Hessian Minister of Transport Dieter Posch, however, declined, to support the "Mannheim direct" option in March 2011.

In May 2012, DB director Grube called for the line to be bundled with motorways A 67 and A 6 so that no forest areas would be cut.

==== Mannheim Bypass ====
As part of the regional planning procedure in the southern section a connection to Mannheim Hauptbahnhof (so-called Option A) was examined as well as a bypass of the Hauptbahnhof, including a link to it (called the "bypass option" or Option B).

Deutsche Bahn favours the bypass of Mannheim Hauptbahnhof (with double track connections to Mannheim Hauptbahnhof at Mannheim-Waldhof and Hockenheim), but many interest groups in the Rhine/Neckar region reject it. The region is the seventh largest German conurbation with about 2.3 million inhabitants. Deutsche Bahn sees an advantage of the bypass in that it would largely avoid noise pollution caused by freight traffic in the urban area. Both the Main-Neckar Railway and the old east branch of the Riedbahn, if it was reactivated by DB, would be available for goods traffic. Deutsche Bahn began rebuilding the east branch of the Riedbahn in November 2007.

With additional costs of €435 million, the bypass option would have greater traffic utilisation and greater economic benefits than option A. Deutsche Bahn also emphasised its intention to have the same number of long-distance trains stopping in Mannheim for both options (as of 2003). The invitation to tender for the design and approval planning of February 2008 specified a bypass of Mannheim Hauptbahnhof.

The Landtag of Baden-Württemberg unanimously rejected the bypass of Mannheim on 19 June 2002. In the framework of the regional planning procedure, the Karlsruhe Regional Council classified option A (no bypass) as compatible with spatial planning, while the bypass solution (option B) was classified as non-compatible with spatial planning.

The bypass solution would allow a journey time of 53 minutes between Frankfurt and Stuttgart (compared to 70 minutes previously). This would allow a system time of one hour, which would be favourable for a clock-face timetable. In conjunction with the planned Stuttgart–Augsburg new and upgraded railway the travel time for long-distance traffic between Frankfurt am Main and Munich would be reduced from today's minimum of 3 1/2 to as little as 2 1/2 hours in the future. The main disadvantage of this option lies in the bypass of Mannheim Hauptbahnhof, a long-distance traffic node, by some of the trains running between Stuttgart and Frankfurt.

A possible compromise provides for the construction of the bypass option, with an hourly ICE service between Frankfurt and Stuttgart that would pass Mannheim, but with other long-distance trains running via Mannheim Hauptbahnhof. In addition, a stop at a new ICE station to be constructed on the bypass route between Mannheim and Heidelberg (near Seckenheim) is being considered.

The federal government saw (as of 2007) no need for a bypass option and therefore excluded its financing from federal funds. According to the Regionalforums ICE-Knoten Rhein-Neckar (Rhine-Neckar ICE node regional forum) the region and Deutsche Bahn agreed that Mannheim Hauptbahnhof would be able to handle the additional traffic that would use the new line.

At the beginning of October 2007, Deutsche Bahn announced a competition to design three bridges near Mannheim worth €228,000. Accordingly, the construction of a 100 m-long (330 ft) bridge over the Mannheim motorway interchange, a 300 m-long (980 ft) bridge over the Mannheim marshalling yard and a 400 m-long (1,300 ft) bridge over the Neckar were planned. In November 2007, Deutsche Bahn cancelled the tender for bridge construction due to the sensitive political situation in the Mannheim area.

== Technology ==
For train protection the track should be equipped with ETCS Level 2 (Baseline 3) without conventional colour light signals.

== Cost ==
The Investment framework plan for Federal Transport Infrastructure by 2010 provided for investments of €1,316.3 million for the project (2006 prices). By 2005, a total of €20.7 million had been spent. Federal funds amounting to €17.0 million were to be invested between 2006 and 2010. In addition to this period, there was a financing requirement of €1,278.6 million (federal funds from 2011, DB AG's own funds and third-party contributions from 2006). The project is listed in the Federal Transport Infrastructure Plan 2003 as "new project" no. 13; the planned investment costs, including the connection to the Mannheim-Stuttgart line and a reserve for planning, amounted to €1,771.4 million.

Due to the delay in construction, the European Commission reduced the funding for the project by €12 million at the end of 2010.
