= Groß Gerau-Dornberg station =

Train station in Germany

Groß Gerau-Dornberg
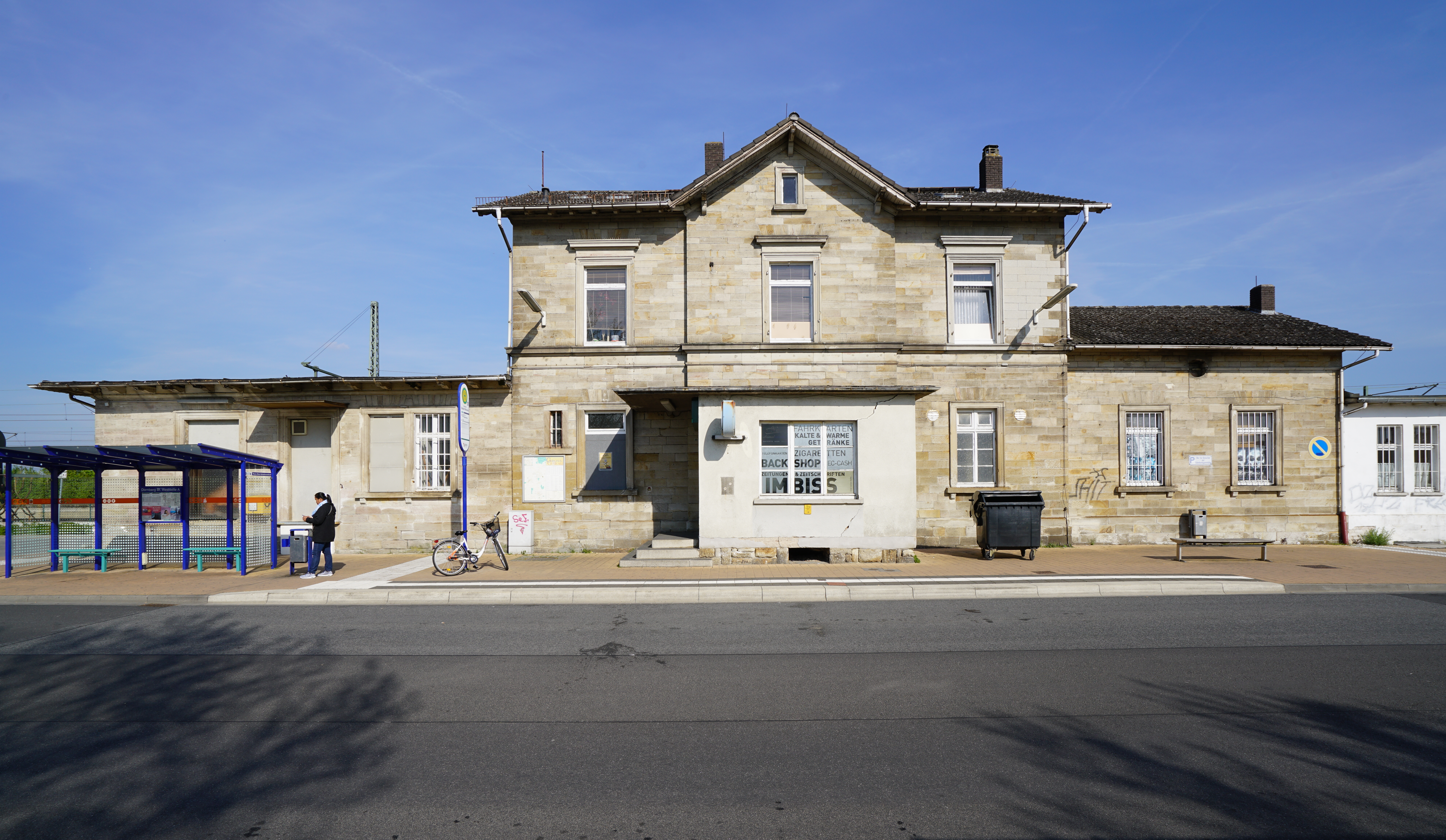

General information
- Location: Darmstädter Straße 94, Groß Gerau, Hesse; Germany
- Coordinates: 49°54′44″N 8°29′41″E
- Lines: Mannheim–Frankfurt Stadion (km 54.39); Groß Gerau-Dornberg–Groß Gerau (km 53.628); Groß Gerau-Dornberg–Klein Gerau Eichmühle (km 53.846)
- Platforms: 5

Construction
- Accessible: Yes

Other information
- Station code: 2300
- DS100 code: FDG
- IBNR: 8002386
- Category: 3
- Website: www.bahnhof.de

History
- Opened: 1879

Services
Preceding station	Rhine-Main S-Bahn	Following station
Mörfelden towards Frankfurt Hbf	S7 (Rhine-Main S-Bahn)	Groß-Gerau-Dornheim towards Riedstadt-Goddelau
Preceding station	DB Regio Mitte	Following station
Mörfelden towards Frankfurt (Main) Hbf	RE 70	Groß-Gerau-Dornheim towards Mannheim Hbf
Location

Groß-Gerau-Dornberg station, with a total of five platform tracks, is the largest and most important station in the Hessian district town of Groß-Gerau. It is located in the suburb of Dornberg at the 54.5 km (33.9 mi) mark of the Mannheim–Frankfurt railway (known as the Riedbahn), which runs from Frankfurt to Mannheim. Eighty-five trains stop here daily and 2,750 passengers use the station, including many schoolchildren.

== Name ==
The station was originally named Dornberg-Groß Gerau. On 1 May 1933, it was renamed Groß Gerau-Dornberg. The spelling of "Groß Gerau" without a hyphen (atypical in Germany) is based on the Prussian spelling rules of the early 20th century. The Prussian-Hessian Railway Company used the Prussian spelling rules, even in the territory of the Grand Duchy of Hesse.

== Location ==
Dornberg station is located a short distance southeast of the town centre of Groß-Gerau, set apart in an industrial park. Its address is Darmstädter Straße 94.

== History ==
Industrialisation began in Dornberg, which was still an independent town at the time, during the 19th century. The connection to the Hessian Ludwig Railway with its Frankfurt am Main – Mannheim line in 1879 (Riedbahn) allowed a diverse commercial life to develop in the station area.

In 1905, the station received a new station building. It has been closed to passengers since 2000. Also in 1905, the station was connected to the Groß Gerau station by a telephone.

In a 1999 test conducted by the Verkehrsclub_Deutschland, the Fahrgastverband Pro Bahn, and the Verbraucherzentrale Hessen (Hessen Hessian Consumer Centre), which examined 27 stations in Hesse, Dornberg received the worst rating. A 2005 station test conducted by the Frankfurter Rundschau showed little change.

Between 2009 and 2012, Dornberg station underwent a major modernication costing approximately €6.7 million. In addition to modernising the two island platforms (the platform adjacent to the station building is not in use) and the pedestrian underpass, the two station forecourts on the east and west sides, including the bus stops there, as well as the park and ride facility on the east side of the station with its connection to the pedestrian underpass, were made fully accessible. Furthermore, lifts to the two island platforms were installed.

== Prospects ==
As part of the general refurbishment of the Mannheim–Frankfurt railway, platform 1 was rebuilt in the second half of 2024. Furthermore, the connecting curves in and around the station are part of the general refurbishment of the Mannheim–Frankfurt railway. The existing H/V signals were largely replaced by Ks signals, the block spacing was increased overall, and the possibility of initially proceeding at reduced speed (e.g. 40 km/h (25 mph)) was utilised when signal spacing was shortened. While previously only the through main tracks of the Mannheim–Frankfurt railway were equipped with LZB continuous train control, a large part of the station is now being equipped with ETCS Level 2. The existing southern departure signals (main signals without distant signals) were replaced by Ks multi-section signals as intermediate signals, two additional departure signals were added to the opposite track towards Mannheim, and an existing Vr distant signal from the opposite track from Mannheim was replaced by a Ks multi-section signal. This allows for closer and more flexible train sequences. Several sets of points in the station were renewed and fitted with swing noses. Two crossovers are being built south and north of the station (at track kilometres 50 (31 miles) and 58 (36 miles)), each with four sets of points on the branch track that can be traversed at 100 km/h (62 mph).

In addition to new Ks signals, some new H/V signals were also installed on the connecting curves. Since the refurbishment in 2024, both connecting curves have been passable in signaled reversible track operation (previously only part could be operated reversiby using distant signals and trapezoidal boards); the permissible speed on the western connecting curve was adjusted from mostly 70 km (43 mi) to 100 km/h (62 mph) to mostly 80 km/h (50 mph).

The third expert report on the proposed Deutschlandtakt (Germany-wide clock-face timetable) assumes the duplication of the Groß-Gerau-Dornberg–Klein-Gerau Eichmühle line. Investments of €10 million are planned for this, based on 2015 prices.

== Infrastructure ==
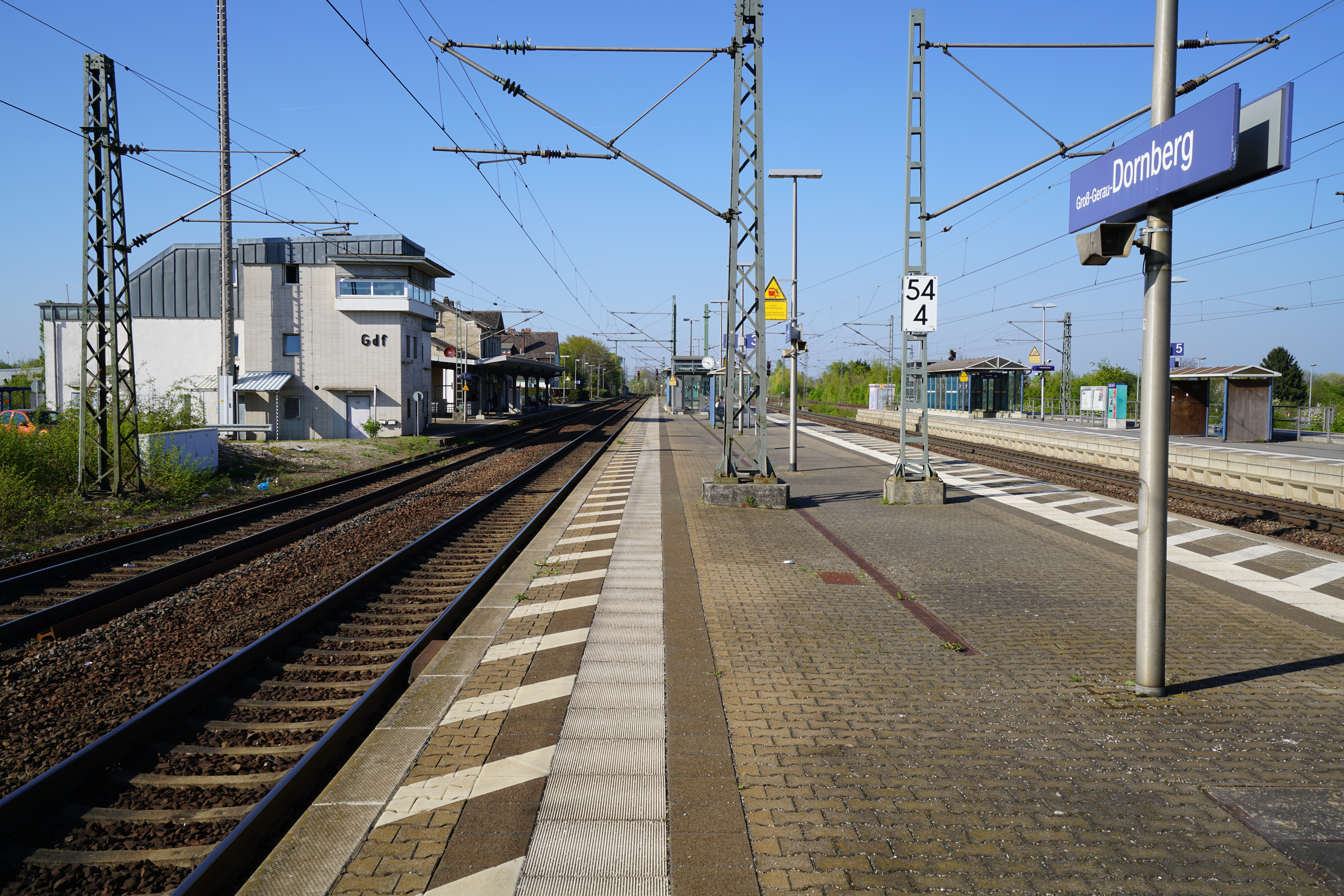
Platforms of Groß Gerau-Dornberg station

=== Track and platform facilities ===
The station has five platform tracks, accessible via a platform adjacent to track 1 and island platforms at tracks 2 and 3, as well as 4 and 5. All tracks except the platform adjacent to the station are used for regular passenger services. The platform adjacent to the station is located on the track of the connecting curve from Mainz, which is not used by scheduled passenger trains.

South of the station building (in the direction of Mannheim) there are additional freight tracks which end as stub tracks with buffer stops shortly before the station building.

There are two connecting curves between the Mannheim–Frankfurt railway and the Rhine-Main Railway (Mainz – Darmstadt – Aschaffenburg) on the Mannheim–Mainz and Mannheim–Darmstadt routes. Both play a role in freight traffic. Passenger service on the Mannheim–Mainz connecting curve between the two Groß Gerau stations, Groß Gerau-Dornberg and Groß Gerau (on the Rhine-Main Railway), has been discontinued for many years.

=== Building ===
Besides the station building, which is no longer usable by passengers, there is a kiosk and a restaurant on platform 1, both of which are leased out. There, travelers can buy newspapers, sweets, and drinks.

== Operation ==
The station has been served by the S7 line of the Rhine-Main S-Bahn since 2002. Since the timetable change in December 2004, the S7 has operated on an odd half-hourly schedule (28/32-minute intervals). In addition to the S-Bahn trains, there is also an hourly Regional-Express (RE 70) between Frankfurt and Mannheim.
