= Zeppelinheim station =

Railway station in Neu-Isenburg, Germany

Zeppelinheim
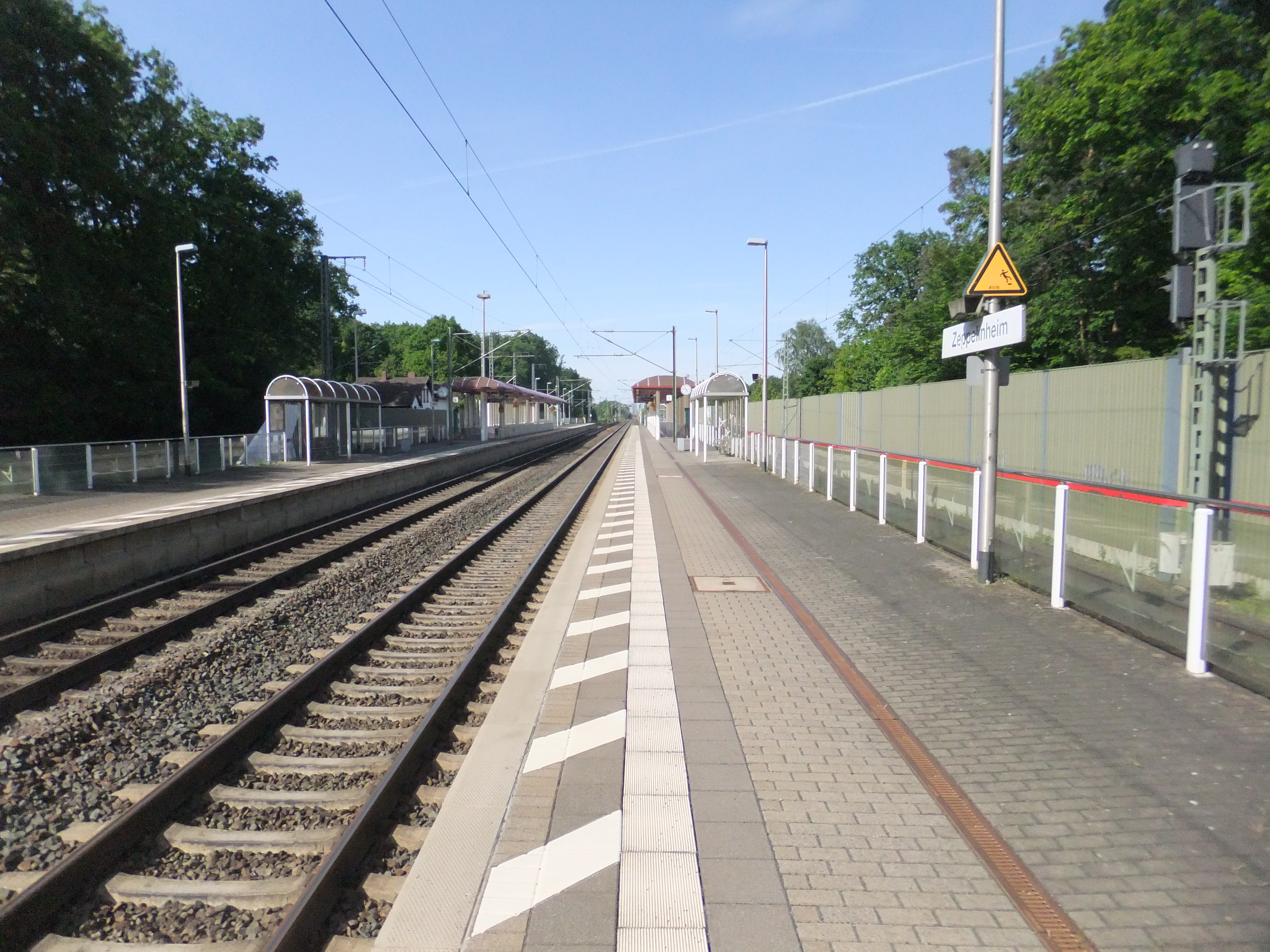

General information
- Location: Neu-Isenburg, Hesse; Germany
- Coordinates: 50°02′13″N 8°36′20″E
- Owner: DB Netz
- Operator: DB Station&Service
- Lines: Mannheim–Frankfurt railway (KBS 645.7/655)
- Platforms: 2 side platforms
- Tracks: 4
- Train operators: S-Bahn Rhein-Main

Construction
- Accessible: Yes

Other information
- Station code: 6999
- DS100 code: FZEP
- IBNR: 8006648
- Category: 6
- Fare zone: : 3570
- Website: www.bahnhof.de

Services
Preceding station	Rhine-Main S-Bahn	Following station
Walldorf (Hess) towards Riedstadt-Goddelau	S7 (Rhine-Main S-Bahn)	Frankfurt am Main Stadion towards Frankfurt Hbf
Location
- Location within Hesse

Zeppelinheim station is a station in the district of Zeppelinheim of the town of Neu-Isenburg in the German state of Hesse. It is located in the urban periphery of Frankfurt am Main and adjacent to Frankfurt Airport. The station is at the junction with a connecting curve from the Mannheim–Frankfurt railway to Frankfurt Airport long-distance station.

== Rail services ==
The station is served by line S7 of the Rhine-Main S-Bahn. Each day a single service of the Regionalbahn RB70 each way at night stops at the Zeppelinheim station. On Sundays and public holidays two Regionalbahn trains stop running towards Frankfurt, one in the morning and one in the evening. No Regionalbahn trains stop in the opposite direction on Sundays and holidays.

The station was opened in the late 1930s to serve the Zeppelin base opened nearby in 1936, which developed into Frankfurt Airport.

== Prospects ==
As part of the Frankfurt–Mannheim high-speed railway project and the new transport concept for the Frankfurt area, a bus connection to the planned Terminal 3 at Frankfurt Airport is being considered, possibly involving the reconstruction of Zeppelinheim station.
