= S7 (Rhine-Main S-Bahn) =

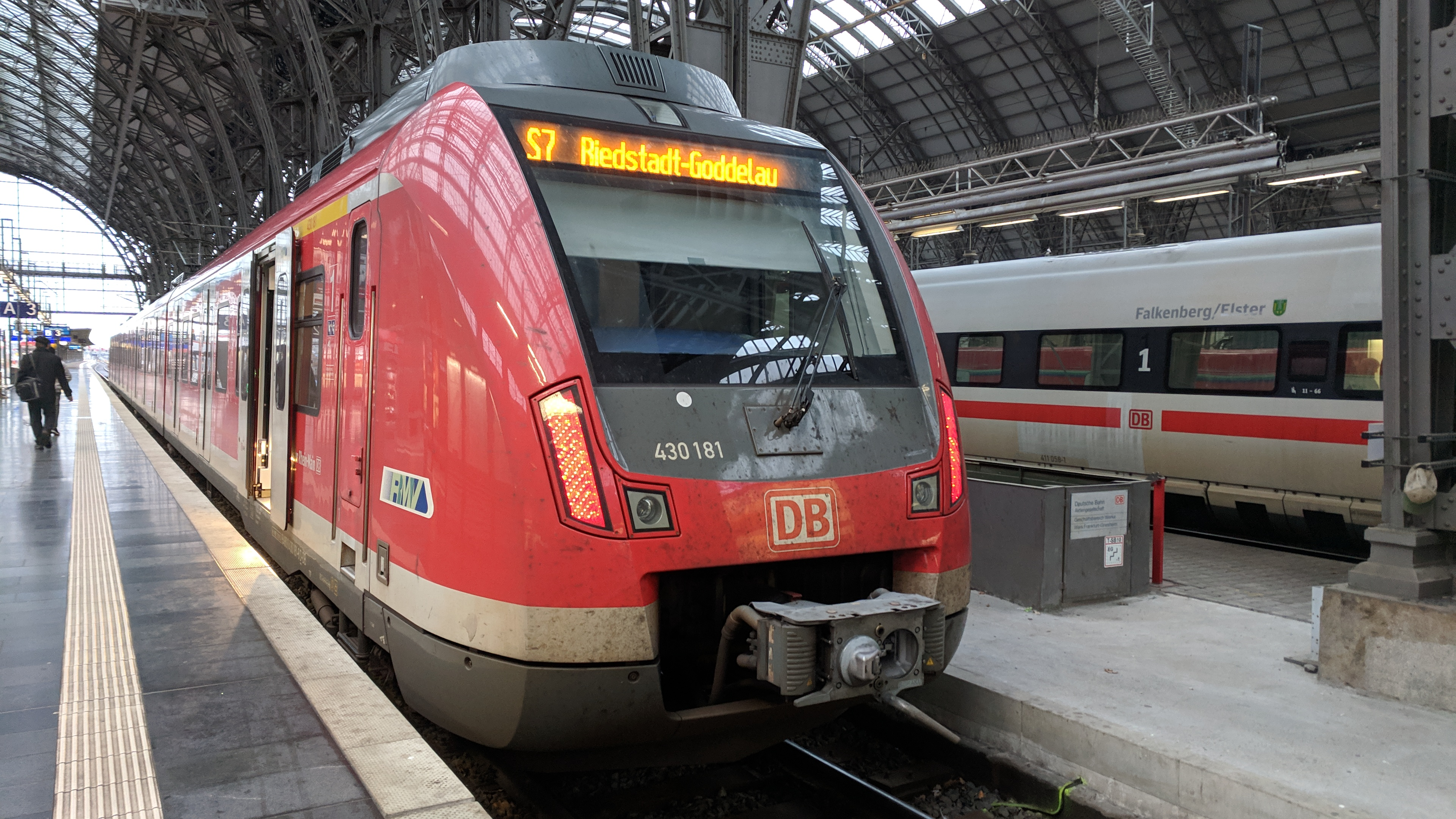
- S7 to Riedstadt-Goddelau at Frankfurt (Main) Hbf

Overview
- Status: Operational
- Owner: Rhein-Main-Verkehrsverbund
- Line number: 7
- Locale: Frankfurt Rhine-Main
- Termini: Riedstadt-Goddelau; Frankfurt Hauptbahnhof
- Stations: 10

Service
- Type: Rapid transit, Commuter rail
- System: S-Bahn Rhein-Main
- Services: Mannheim–Frankfurt railway
- Route number: 645.7
- Operator: DB Regio
- Depot: Frankfurt Hbf
- Rolling stock: DBAG Class 425

History
- Opened: 2002

Technical
- Line length: 35.2 km (21.9 mi)
- Track gauge: 1,435 mm (4 ft 8 1/2 in) standard gauge
- Electrification: Overhead line

The S7 service of the S-Bahn Rhein-Main system bearing the KBS (German scheduled railway route) number 645.7

== History ==
The S7 is the newest S-Bahn service in the system. It started its operation in 2002. Before that a regional railway service (RB 70) ran on exactly the same route.

== Operation ==
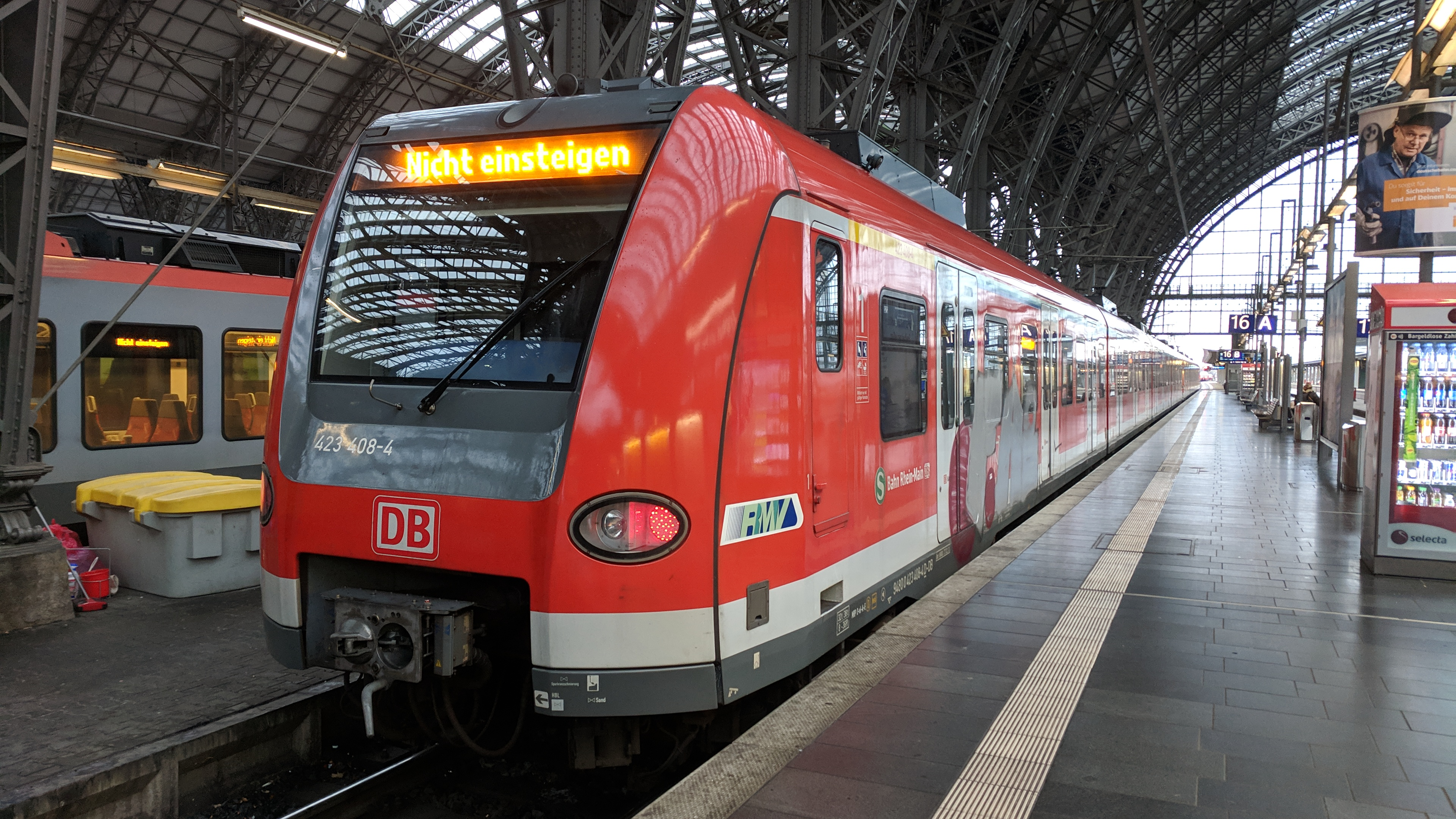
S7 is the only S-Bahn service in Rhein-Main that starts always at the above ground platform hall of Frankfurt central station

S7 (Rhine-Main S-Bahn)	Journey time		Station	Transfer	S-Bahn service since
=== Kreis Groß-Gerau ===
	0		Riedstadt-Goddelau		2002
	3	+3	Riedstadt-Wolfskehlen		2002
	5	+2	Groß-Gerau-Dornheim		2002
	9	+4	Groß Gerau-Dornberg		2002
	15	+6	Mörfelden		2002
	18	+3	Walldorf		2002
=== Kreis Offenbach ===
	22	+4	Neu-Isenburg-Zeppelinheim		2002
=== Frankfurt am Main ===
	26	+4	Frankfurt Stadion	S8 (Rhine-Main S-Bahn) S9 (Rhine-Main S-Bahn)	1978
	30	+4	Frankfurt-Niederrad	S8 (Rhine-Main S-Bahn) S9 (Rhine-Main S-Bahn)	1978
	35	+5	Frankfurt Hbf	U4 U5	1978
