= Groß Gerau station =

Railway station in Groß-Gerau, Germany

Groß Gerau
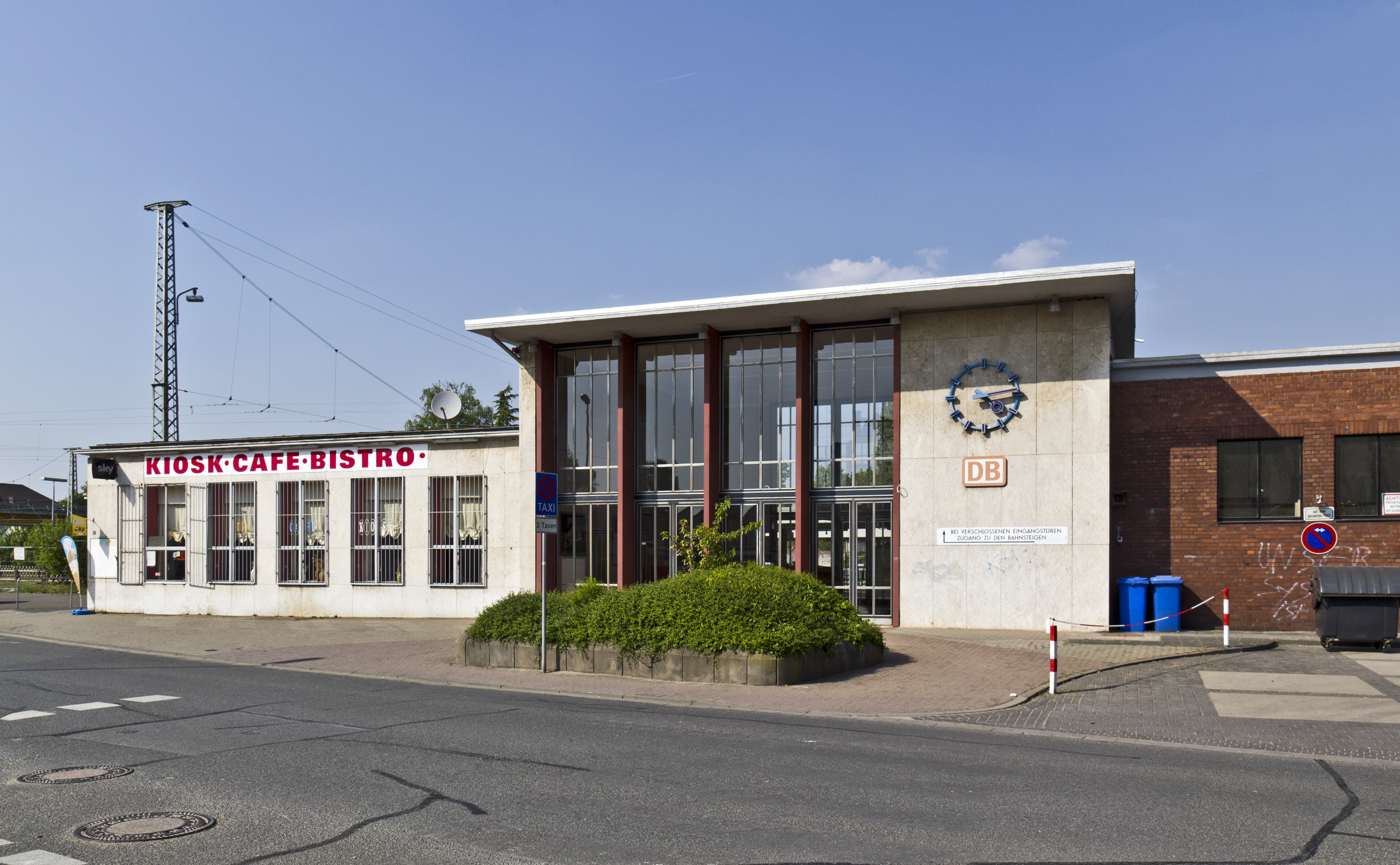

General information
- Location: Groß-Gerau, Hesse; Germany
- Coordinates: 49°55′30″N 8°29′11″E
- Lines: Rhine-Main Railway (19.7 km); Connecting curve to Mannheim–Frankfurt railway
- Platforms: 3

Other information
- Station code: 2299
- DS100 code: FGER
- IBNR: 8000136
- Category: 3
- Fare zone: : 3701
- Website: www.bahnhof.de

History
- Opened: 1858

Services
Preceding station	Hessische Landesbahn	Following station
Nauheim (b Gr.Gerau) towards Wiesbaden Hbf	RB 75	Klein Gerau towards Aschaffenburg Hbf
Location

Groß Gerau station is located approximately 500 metres north of the centre of the town of Groß-Gerau in the German state of Hesse on the Rhine-Main Railway, running from Wiesbaden and Mainz to Darmstadt and Aschaffenburg. A curve branches off near the station connecting to the nearby Groß-Gerau-Dornberg station on the Mannheim–Frankfurt railway. The station is classified by Deutsche Bahn as a category 5 station. The station name has no hyphen unlike the town it is in, following a Prussian government order of 1910, which applied because of Prussian finance for the line, even though the station was in the Grand Duchy of Hesse.

== History ==
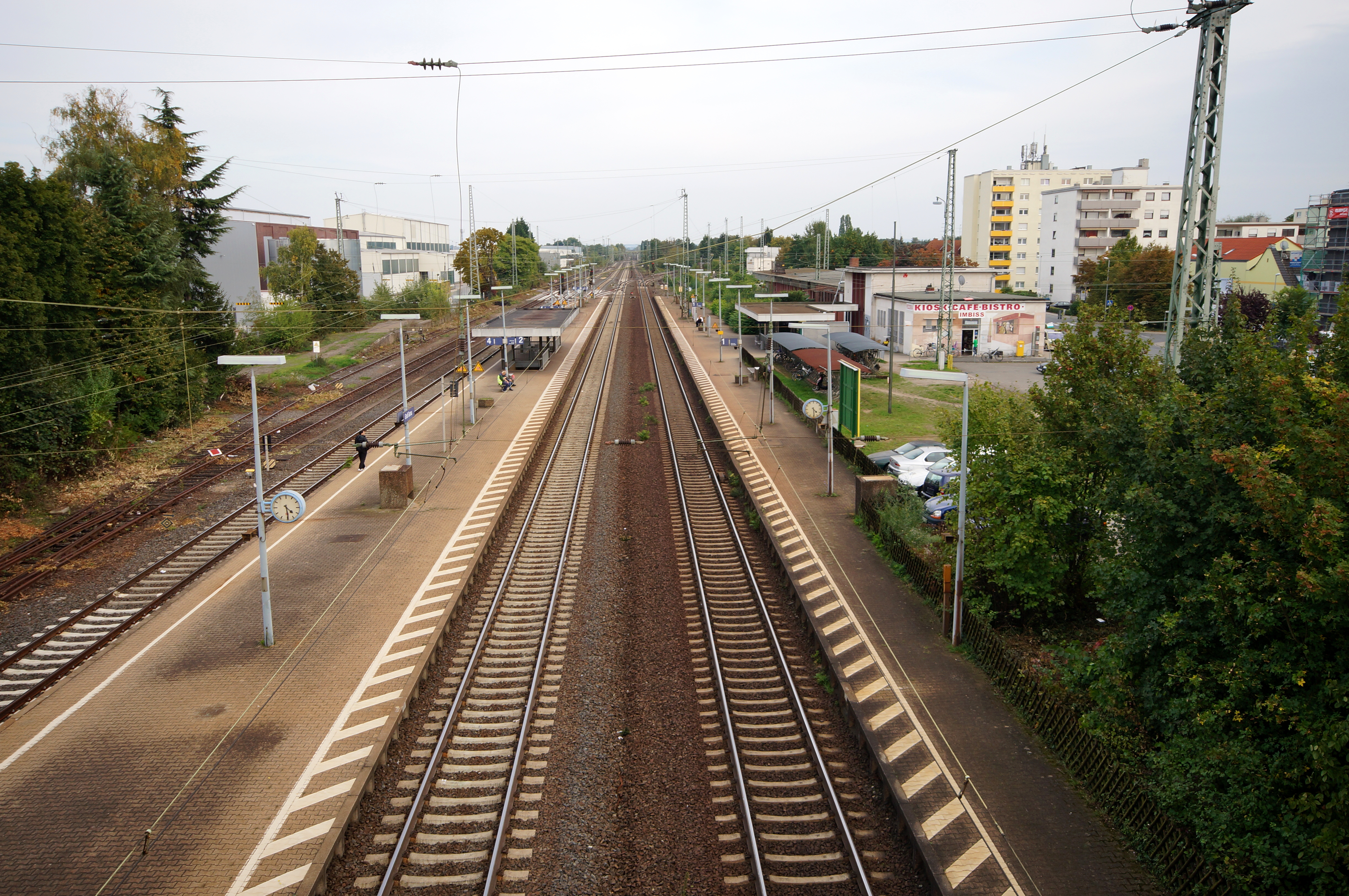
Platform of Groß Gerau station

The station was opened with the section of the Rhine-Main Railway between Mainspitze and Darmstadt opened by the Hessian Ludwig Railway (Hessische Ludwigsbahn) in 1858. In Groß-Gerau, a wooden hut served as the station building. A new station building was opened in 1868. During the First World War, a volunteer ambulance corps and a branch of the Red Cross run by the ladies of the Alice-Hospital (founded by Princess Alice, Queen Victoria’s daughter) operated in the station building. In 1944, the station building was destroyed in an air raid and it was rebuilt in 1957. The station building is now recognised as an historic landmark under the Hessian Heritage Act.

== Infrastructure ==
The station has three platform tracks, comprising the “home” platform beside the station building and an island platform. To the east there are freight sidings and a freight siding to a nearby enterprise. To the west there is a connection to a former site of the sugar manufacturer Südzucker, which operated an extensive system of tracks. Since 1970, the rail traffic has been controlled by a relay interlocking.

== Rail services ==
The station is served by the Regionalbahn service RB 75, running every hour (during peak hours every 30 minutes) from Wiesbaden via Mainz to Groß Gerau and continuing through Darmstadt to Aschaffenburg.

Line	Route	Frequency
RB 75	Rhein-Main-Bahn; Wiesbaden Hbf – Mainz Hbf – Groß Gerau – Darmstadt Hbf – Babenhausen – Aschaffenburg Hbf	Mon-Fri: twice an hour, Sat-Sun: hourly
