= Mannheim–Frankfurt railway =

German railway line

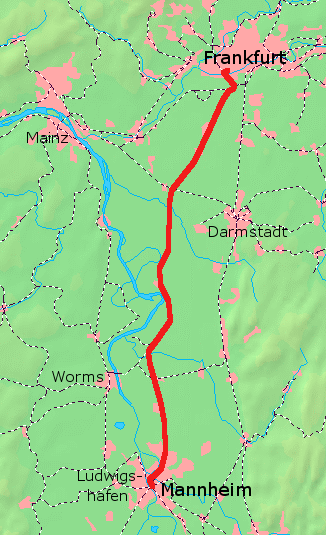

Overview
- Line number: 3533 (Groß-Gerau-Dornberg–Groß-Gerau); 3534 (Groß-Gerau-Dornberg–Klein-Gerau Eichmühle); 4010 (Mannheim–Frankfurt-Stadion); 4012 (Mannheim-Neckarstadt–M-Waldhof)
- Locale: Hesse and Baden-Württemberg, Germany

Service
- Route number: 655

Technical
- Line length: 74.8 km (46.5 mi)
- Track gauge: 1,435 mm (4 ft 8 1/2 in) standard gauge
- Electrification: 15 kV/16.7 Hz AC overhead catenary
- Operating speed: 200 km/h (124.3 mph) (maximum)

Mannheim–Frankfurt railway is a German standard gauge, electrified railway line and runs in southern Hesse and northern Baden-Württemberg between Frankfurt and Mannheim. It is also called the Riedbahn (Ried Railway). The line runs through an area called the Hessische Ried, hence the name. The term Riedbahn was originally used for the Darmstadt–Worms railway and the two lines share the central section between Groß-Gerau and Biblis.

The Mannheim–Frankfurt railway is used by three Intercity-Express routes, connecting South Germany with Berlin, Hamburg, Cologne and Dortmund and regional services of the Rhine-Main transport union and Rhine-Neckar transport union. The line is one of the busiest lines in Germany with 650 trains per day, although most freight uses the Main-Neckar Railway, which is further east and gives better access to the Mannheim marshalling yard.

== History ==
The Riedbahn was originally built by the Hessian Ludwig Railway (Hessische Ludwigsbahn), to connect Darmstadt, the capital of the Grand Duchy of Hesse, with Worms, the second most important city in the province of Rheinhessen of the Grand Duchy. The riparian communities contributed significantly to the financing of the project.

On 29 May 1869, the line from Darmstadt via Riedstadt-Goddelau and Biblis to Rosengarten station, on the opposite side of the Rhine from Worms, was opened by the Prime Minister of the Grand Duchy of Hesse, Reinhard Carl Friedrich von Dalwigk. From Rosengarten station, trains crossed the Rhine from 1870 to 1900 using the Worms-Rosengarten train ferry, as there was no bridge across the Rhine at Worms. Between Worms and Hofheim services on the Nibelung Railway run on the same tracks.

The line from Biblis to the Mannheim suburb of Waldhof was opened in October 1879, so that the route to Mannheim ended not at the central station, but at the Riedbahnhof, north of today's Kurpfalz Bridge. In November 1879, the (then) branch line from Goddelau to Frankfurt was opened.

=== Changes to the line ===
The opening of the line from Waldhof through Käfertal to the Rhine Valley line south of Mannheim station in 1880, enabled trains to run from the Riedbahn into Mannheim station from the south. In order to continue towards Karlsruhe and Stuttgart trains had to reverse in the station.

In December 1900, a railway bridge was opened over the Rhine to Worms, creating a direct connection to Worms and replacing the existing terminus at Rosengarten and the ferry crossing over the Rhine.

In 1975, the railway between Darmstadt and Goddelau was closed due to lack of traffic and partly dismantled. All that remains of the line is a siding from Darmstadt to Weiterstadt-Riedbahn, where the line ends. However, there is a connection between the Riedbahn and the Rhine-Main Railway to Darmstadt and Mainz at Groß-Gerau.

=== High-speed traffic ===
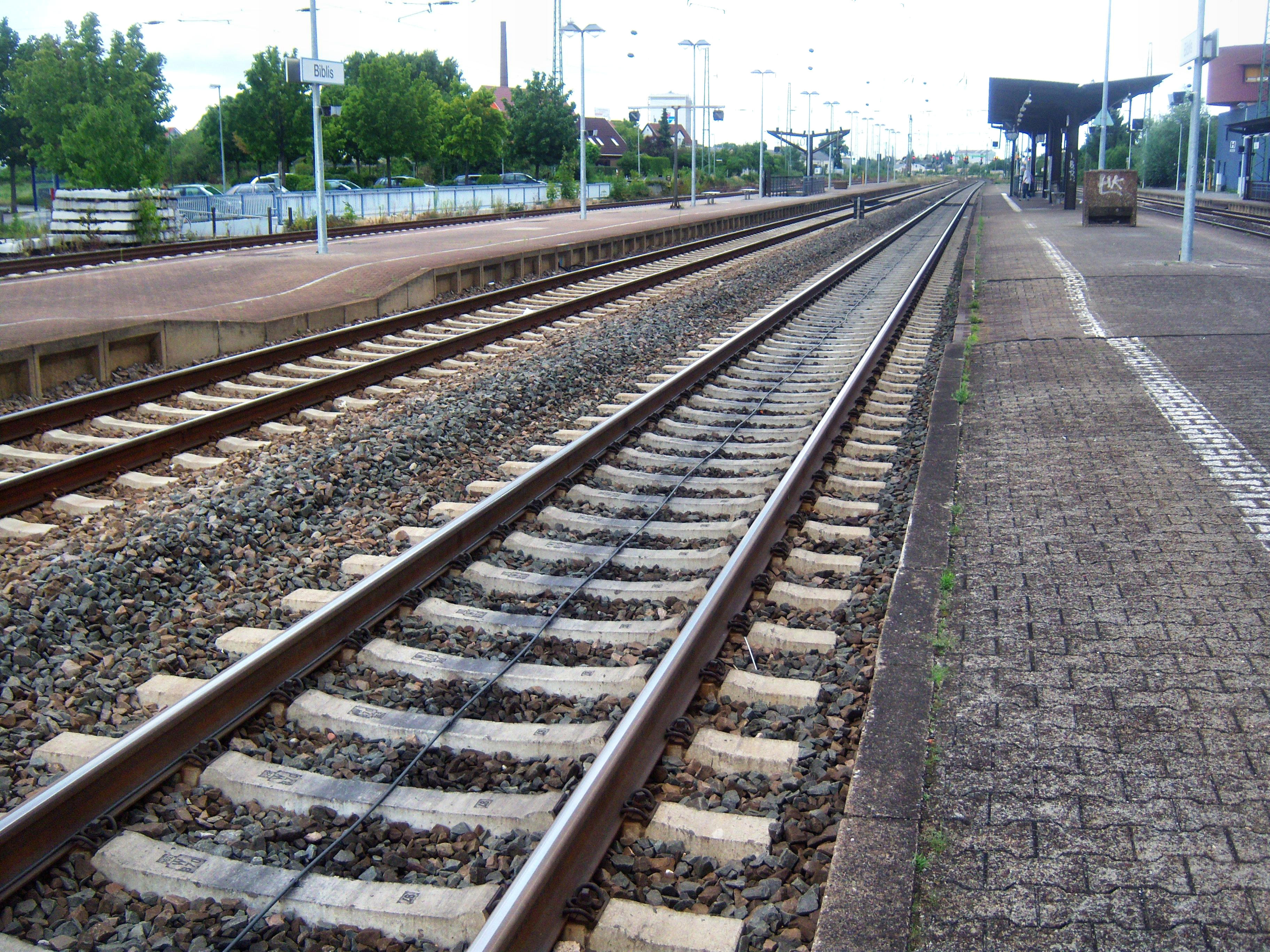
LZB in Biblis station

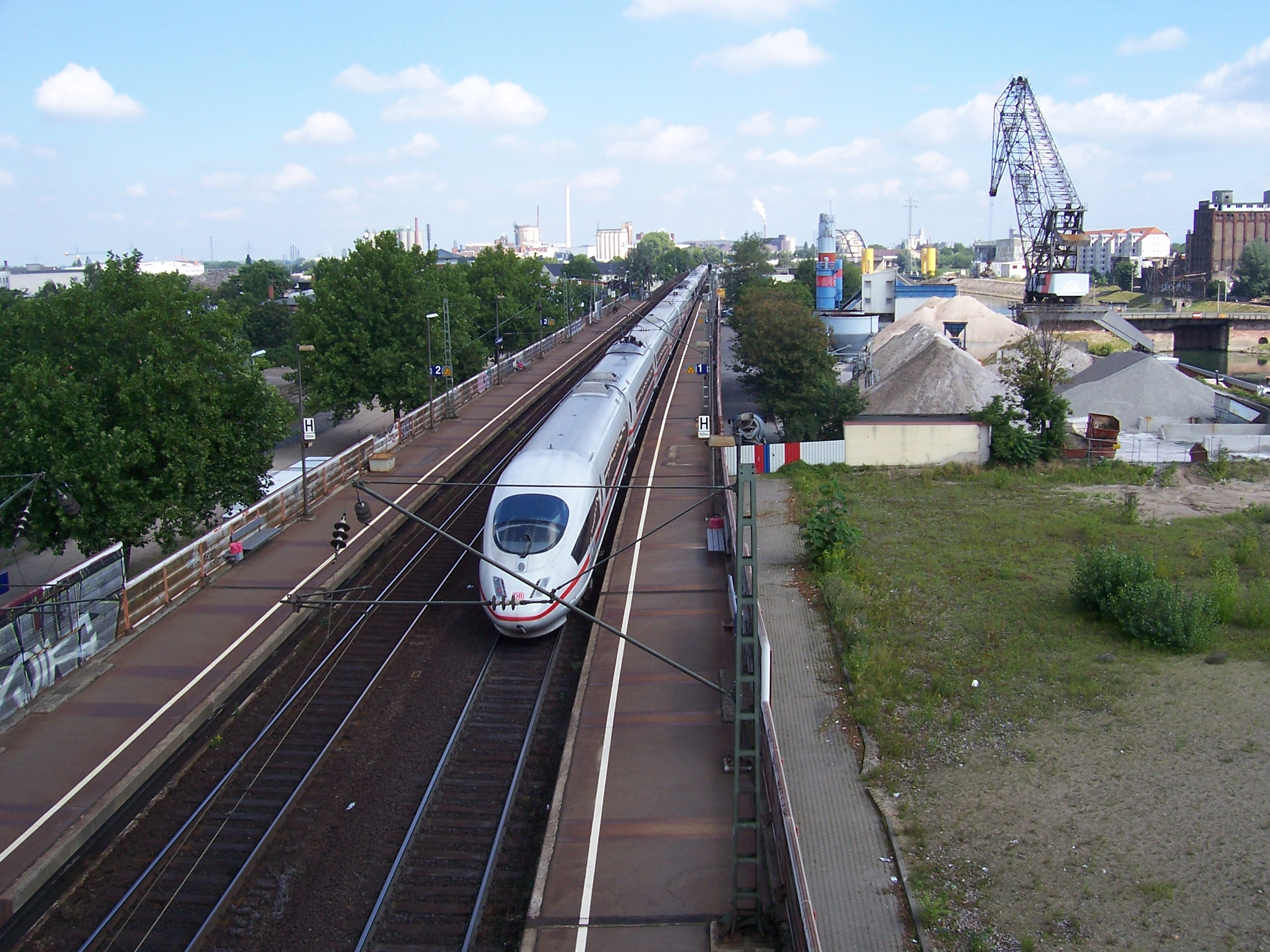
ICE train on Riedbahn at Mannheim Handelshafen

Until the opening of the 9.5-kilometre (6 mi) long Western Entrance to the Riedbahn (westlichen Einführung der Riedbahn, WER) to Mannheim Hauptbahnhof in 1985, trains from Frankfurt came from the south to reach Mannheim and had to reverse to continue south towards Heidelberg or Karlsruhe on the Rhine Valley line. Some TGV and Intercity-Express (ICE) services continue to use the eastern branch of the Ried Railway to cross the Rhine without reversal. Almost all regional trains run on the new western approach; Mannheim-Käfertal station is currently operated by one Regionalbahn service each day. The eastern Ried Railway has 180 pairs of trains each day, mainly freight traffic.

Already in the Federal Transport Infrastructure Plan (Bundesverkehrswegeplan) of 1973, the Ried Railway was planned as one of eight rail routes to be rebuilt as "upgraded" lines (Ausbaustrecken). In its successor, the Co-ordinated Investment Program for Federal Transport Infrastructure (Koordinierten Investitionsprogramm für die Bundesverkehrswege) of 1977, the track was included as one of six development projects. The development project was also included in the Federal Transport Infrastructure Plan (Koordinierten Investitionsprogramm für die Bundesverkehrswege) of 1980. The Federal Transport Infrastructure Plan of 1985 included the first stage of the route, which was essentially the new approach to Mannheim Hauptbahnhof, as part of the most urgently needed works. The second stage was included in the list of “further needs” in the same document. In the 1970s, a new line from Cologne to Gross-Gerau that would have connected with the Ried Railway in Gross-Gerau was planned; this project was later abandoned.

The second stage should have been completed by the time of the full commissioning of the Mannheim–Stuttgart high-speed railway (1991). Due to delays in the project approval process, some measures were implemented later, especially the elimination of level crossings. By the end of 1989, four of the 27 crossings along the line had been removed. By early 1991, the planning approval process for four of the twelve sections had been initiated. In four of the eight sections work had largely been completed. Overall, 46 individual projects had been carried out by the end of 1989.

The line was opened for ICE operations between Stockstadt and Waldhof on 2 June 1991. On the same section of line, capacity was increased from 240 to 280 trains per day. The Bürstadt railway bridge and four other bridge associated with the upgrade were rebuilt.

In the early 1990s, preliminary planning also began for the construction of a connecting curve to connect Frankfurt Airport to the line (later realised as the Frankfurter Kreuz Tunnel, the first section of the Cologne–Frankfurt high-speed line).

At the timetable change in May 1998, the maximum speed limit on a 15 km length of the southern section was raised to 200 km/h. The northern section from Groß-Gerau to Frankfurt was completed in autumn 1999 for high-speed operations. From 5 December 1999, the 3.3-km section from Leeheim to Dornberg could be operated at 200 km/h.

In order to overcome heavy congestion of the line and to accelerate train services, it is proposed to build a new line between Frankfurt and Mannheim. The preferred route was selected at the end of 2022. The planning approval process is scheduled to begin in 2025. In the meantime, the current line was closed on 15 July 2024 for reconstruction. It was reopened on 15 December 2024. During this time, major improvements were undertaken, for example, installing ETCS. This work did not include the replacement of level crossings.

== Operations ==
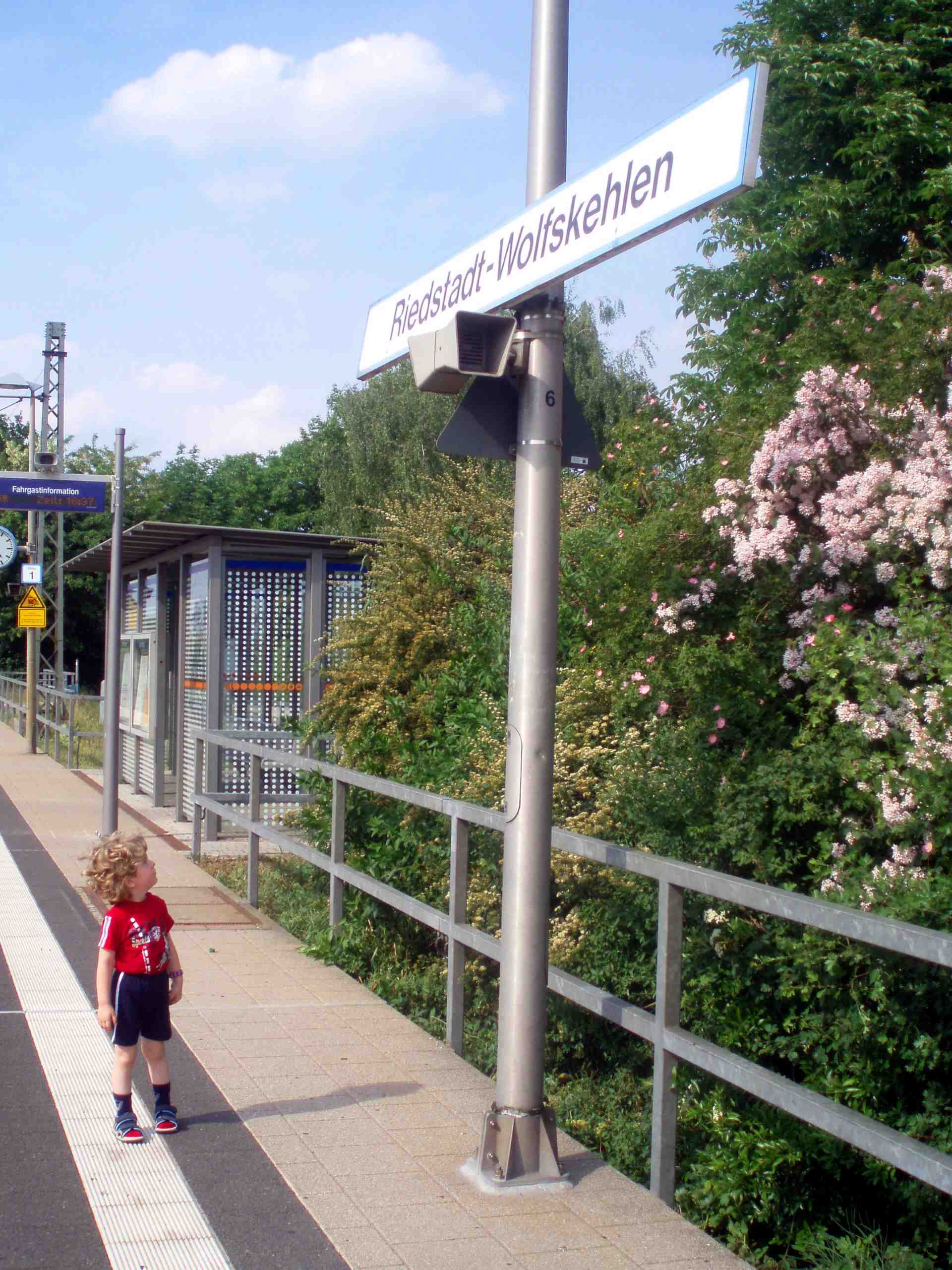
Riedstadt-Wolfskehlen station

With 650 trains per day (as of 2007), the corridor between Mannheim and Frankfurt/Mainz is one of the busiest lines in Germany. A further increase to 900 trains in the corridor is expected by 2015.

As one of the major lines in Germany and the busiest line in southern Germany, the 78-kilometre (48 mi) long Frankfurt-Mannheim line between Zeppelinheim and Mannheim-Waldhof, the line's Linienzugbeeinflussung train control system is certified for speeds up to 200 km/h; although the maximum speed at the Biblis curve is about 90 km/h (56 mph). Most freight traffic runs over the parallel Main Neckar line because of its better connection to the Mannheim marshalling yard.

In addition to the regional services of the Rhein-Main-Verkehrsverbund and the Verkehrsverbund Rhein-Neckar, three Intercity-Express lines run on the Ried Railway, connecting southern Germany with Berlin, Hamburg and Cologne/Dortmund.

A Regional-Express service (RE 70) operates between Mannheim and Frankfurt and a Regionalbahn service (RB 62) operates between Worms and Biblis. One Regional Express operates each way between Frankfurt and Worms at night. Services of Rhine-Main S-Bahn line 7 run between Frankfurt Hauptbahnhof and Riedstadt-Goddelau. The S 9 Rhine-Neckar S-Bahn services operates between Biblis, Mannheim and Karlsruhe.

After the opening of the new the Rhine/Main–Rhine/Neckar high-speed line, capacity on the Ried Railway will be sufficient to allow Rhine-Main S-Bahn S-Bahn line 7 to Gross-Gerau to run every quarter of an hour rather than every half hour.

== Planning ==
To ease overloading on the line a new high-speed line from Frankfurt to Mannheim is being planned, cleared for top speeds of up to 300 km/h. The new line would mostly run close to the A5 and the A67 motorways. Deutsche Bahn originally proposed to build a bypass of the Mannheim Hauptbahnhof (the most important rail junction in southwestern Germany, although it is not a Category 1 station like Karlsruhe Hbf), but dropped this plan for the time being in 2006 due to strong community and political opposition. Construction has not started yet due to the difficulty in reaching agreement on the details of the project. Detailed planning approvals are being sought (as of 2023) and construction is due be completed in 2030.

A connection to the planned Terminal 3 at Frankfurt Airport is being considered. A connecting curve for S 7 and RE 70 services, including an underground S-Bahn station, would cost €120 million. Such a connection would have a Benefit-cost ratio of more than 1.

The second track of the eastern branch of the Ried Railway in Mannheim is to be reactivated in 2015 and the line will be served by S-Bahn services, according to the Baden-Württemberg Ministry of Environment and Transport. A new S-Bahn stop is planned at Mannheim-Neuostheim at the crossing of Dürerstraße. From December 2015, S-Bahn trains will run on the line every hour between Biblis and Mannheim Hauptbahnhof.

== Lines ==
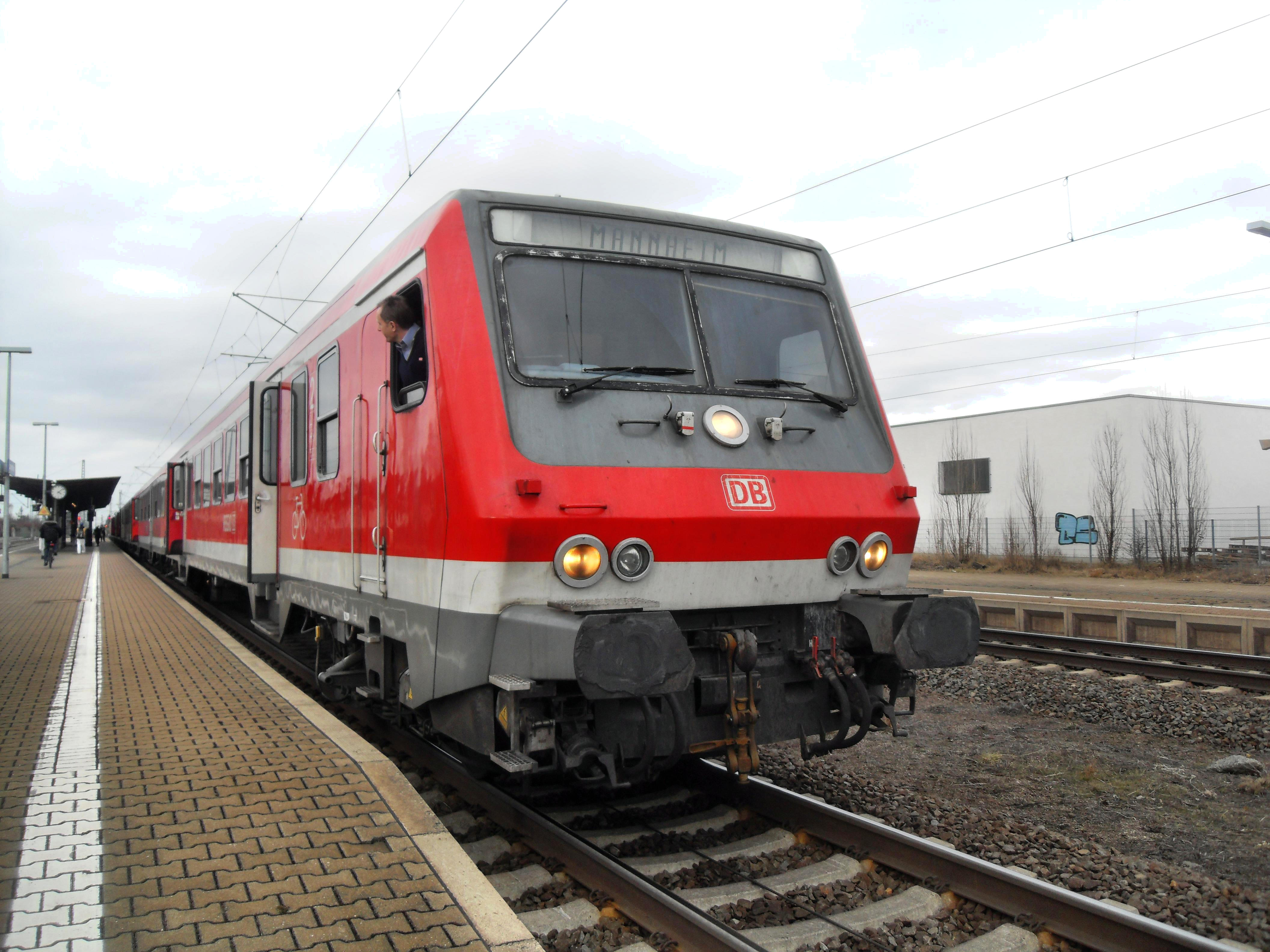
Regional-Express in Lampertheim station on the way to Mannheim

The following regional lines use the Mannheim–Frankfurt railway:

- Frankfurt Hauptbahnhof – Groß Gerau-Dornberg – Riedstadt-Goddelau
- RE 70 Frankfurt – Groß-Gerau-Dornberg – Riedstadt-Goddelau – Biblis – Mannheim
- S9 Groß Rohrheim – Mannheim – Mannheim-Handelshafen – Graben-Neudorf – Karlsruhe
- S8 Biblis – Mannheim-Käfertal – Mannheim
