= Riedstadt-Goddelau station =

Railway station in Riedstadt, Germany

Riedstadt Goddelau
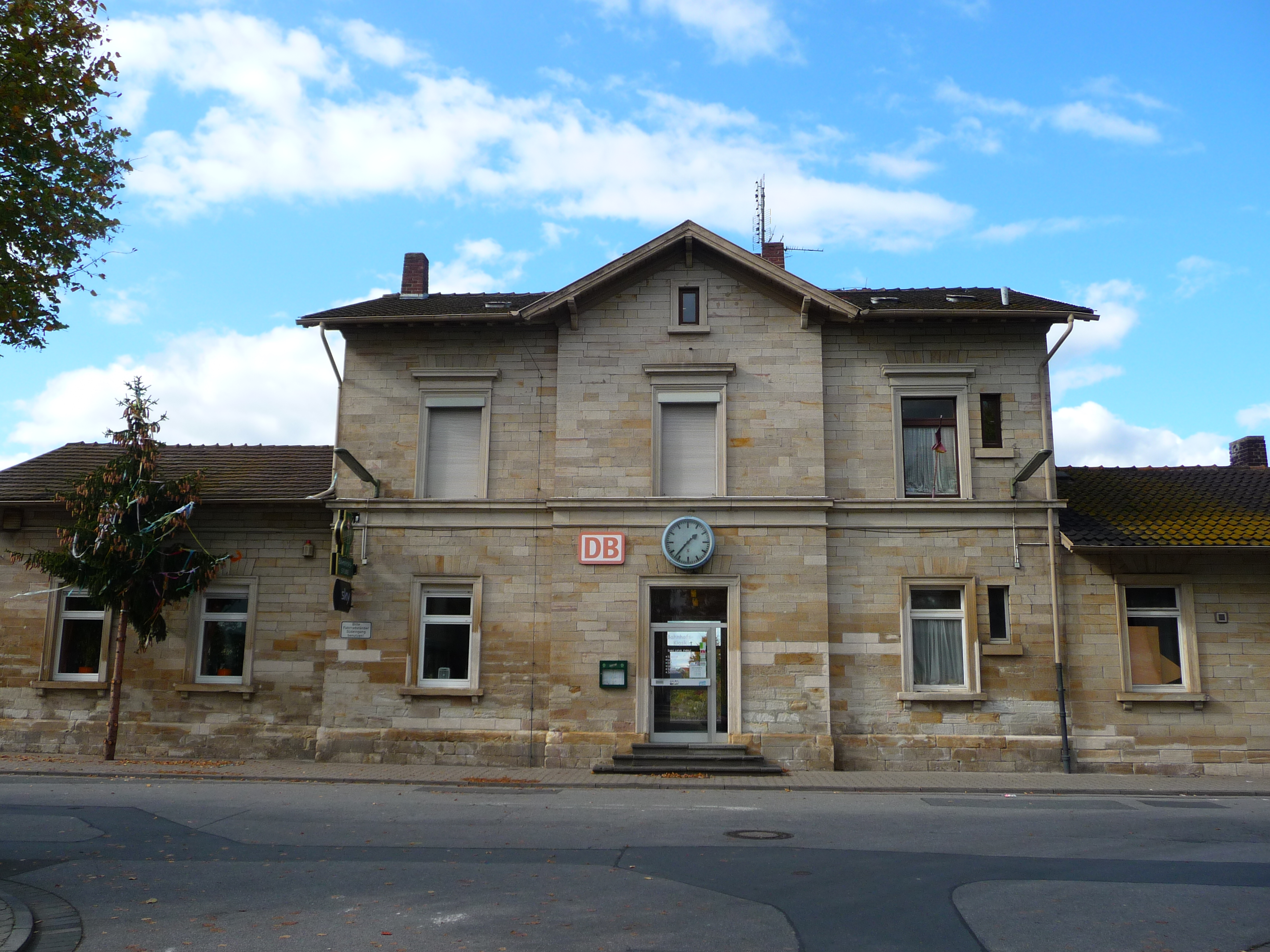
- Entrance building from the street

General information
- Location: Riedstadt, Hesse; Germany
- Coordinates: 49°49′59″N 8°29′21″E
- Lines: Mannheim–Frankfurt railway; Darmstadt–Worms railway
- Platforms: 5

Construction
- Accessible: Yes

Other information
- Station code: 2161
- DS100 code: FGE
- IBNR: 8000126
- Category: 4
- Fare zone: : 3801
- Website: www.bahnhof.de

History
- Opened: 1879

Services
Preceding station	DB Regio Mitte	Following station
Groß Gerau-Dornberg towards Frankfurt (Main) Hbf	RE 70	Stockstadt (Rhein) towards Mannheim Hbf
Preceding station	Rhine-Main S-Bahn	Following station
Terminus	S7 (Rhine-Main S-Bahn)	Riedstadt-Wolfskehlen towards Frankfurt Hbf
Location
- Location within Hesse Location within Germany Location within Europe

Riedstadt-Goddelau station, along with Riedstadt Wolfskehlen station, serves the town of Riedstadt in the south of the German state of Hesse on the Mannheim–Frankfurt railway and the Darmstadt–Worms railway. The station is classified by Deutsche Bahn as a category 4 station. It is served by local and S-Bahn trains.

== History ==
The station was opened on 15 April 1869 under the name Goddelau-Erfelden. Then as now, it served two districts of Riedstadt, Goddelau and Erfelden. On 29 May 1869, the prime minister of the Grand Duchy of Hesse, Carl Friedrich Freiherr von Dalwigk, opened the first section of the Hessian Ludwig Railway’s Darmstadt–Worms railway, from Darmstadt Ludwig station via Goddelau and Biblis to Rosengarten station, on the opposite side of the Rhine to Worms. From there, the Worms-Rosengarten train ferry operated over the Rhine from 1870 to 1900, when it was replaced by a bridge across the Rhine. This was the first section of the Riedbahn (Ried Railway), which runs through an area called the Hessische Ried, hence the name.

The line from Biblis to the Mannheim suburb of Waldhof was opened in October 1879, so that the route to Mannheim ended not at Mannheim Central Station, but at the Riedbahnhof, north of today's Kurpfalz Bridge. In November 1879, the (then) branch line from Goddelau to Frankfurt was opened.

In 1975, the railway between Darmstadt and Goddelau was closed due to lack of traffic and partly dismantled. All that remains of the line is a siding from Darmstadt to Weiterstadt-Riedbahn, where the line ends.

As a result of the incorporation of the former twin town of Goddelau-Wolfskehlen in the newly founded city of Riedstadt, Goddelau-Erfelden station was renamed as Riedstadt-Goddelau on 1 January 1977.

== Operations ==
Riedstadt lies on the network organised by the Rhein-Main-Verkehrsverbund (Rhine-Main Transport Association, RMV).

=== Rail ===
Goddelau-Riedstadt station is served hourly by Regional-Express line RE 70 en route from Mannheim via Biblis and Gernsheim to Frankfurt Central Station. Since 2002, the station has also been served every 30 minutes on weekdays by Rhine-Main S-Bahn line S7, which terminates in Riedstadt-Goddelau.

=== Bus ===
Bus routes 41, 45 and K62 stop at the Goddelauer Bahnhof bus stop. These connect the station with the surrounding cities and towns, including along the disused section of the Ried Railway between Goddelau, Griesheim and Darmstadt. The station also has a taxi stand and a park and ride car park.
