= Weiterstadt =

- Town
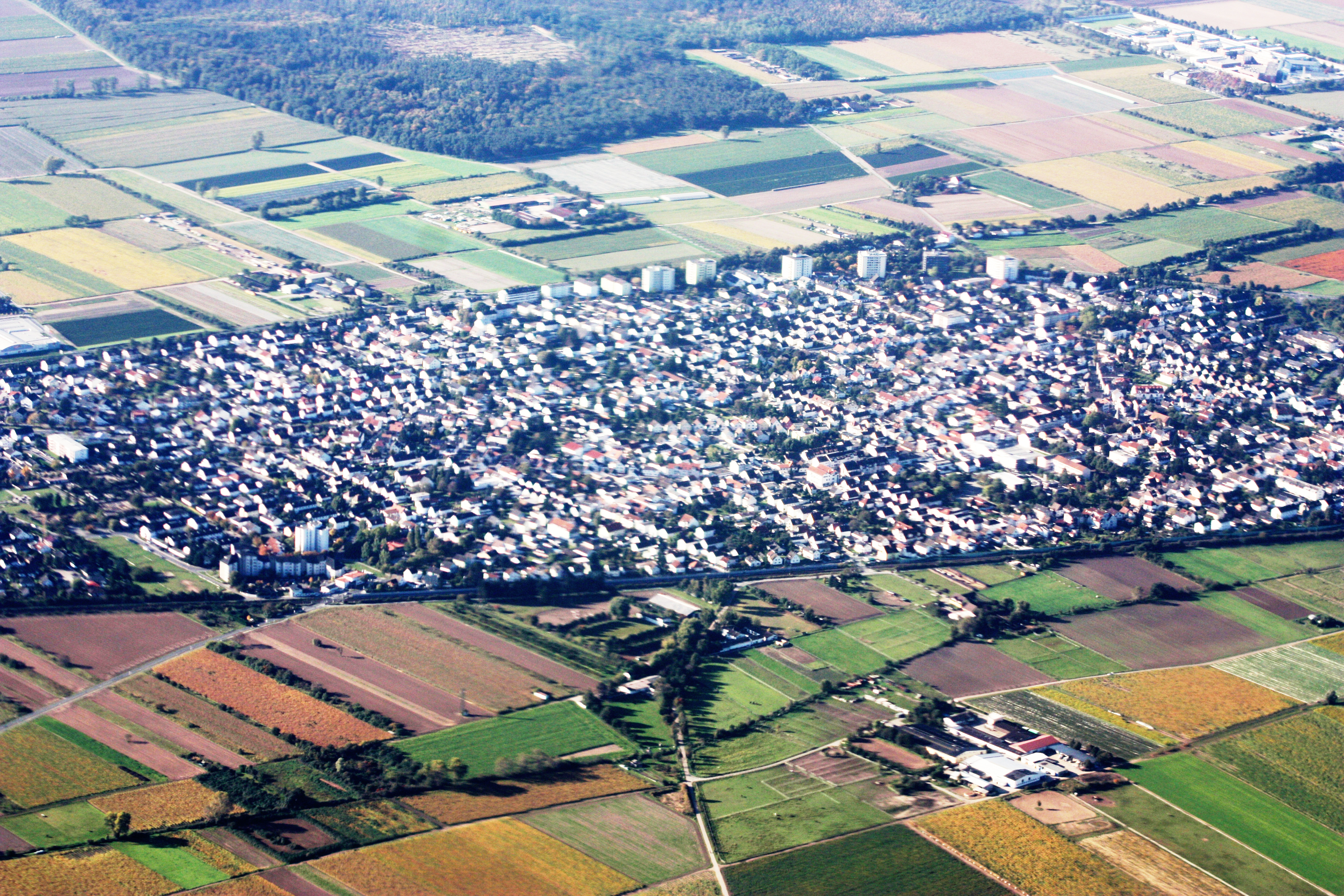
- Weiterstadt

- Coat of arms

- Location of Weiterstadt within Darmstadt-Dieburg district
- Interactive map of Weiterstadt
- Location within Germany Location within Hesse
- Coordinates: 49°54′N 8°36′E
- Country: Germany
- State: Hesse
- Admin. region: Darmstadt
- District: Darmstadt-Dieburg
- Subdivisions: 5 Ortsteile

Government
  - Mayor (2019–25): Ralf Möller (SPD)

Area
  - Total: 34.4 km^{2} (13.3 sq mi)
- Elevation: 105 m (344 ft)

Population (2025-12-31)
  - Total: 26,638
  - Density: 774/km^{2} (2,010/sq mi)
- Time zone: UTC+01:00 (CET)
  - Summer (DST): UTC+02:00 (CEST)
- Postal codes: 64331
- Dialling codes: 06150 (Riedbahn: 06151)
- Vehicle registration: DA
- Website: www.weiterstadt.de

Weiterstadt (German pronunciation: [ˈvaɪtɐʃtat]) is a town in the Darmstadt-Dieburg district, in Hesse, Germany. It is situated directly northwest of Darmstadt.

== Twin towns – sister cities ==
Weiterstadt is twinned with:

- Bagno a Ripoli, Italy
- Kiens, Italy
- Verneuil-sur-Seine, France
