= Nibelungensteig =

Hiking trail in the Odenwald, Germany

Coordinates: 49.72586°N 8.60955°E

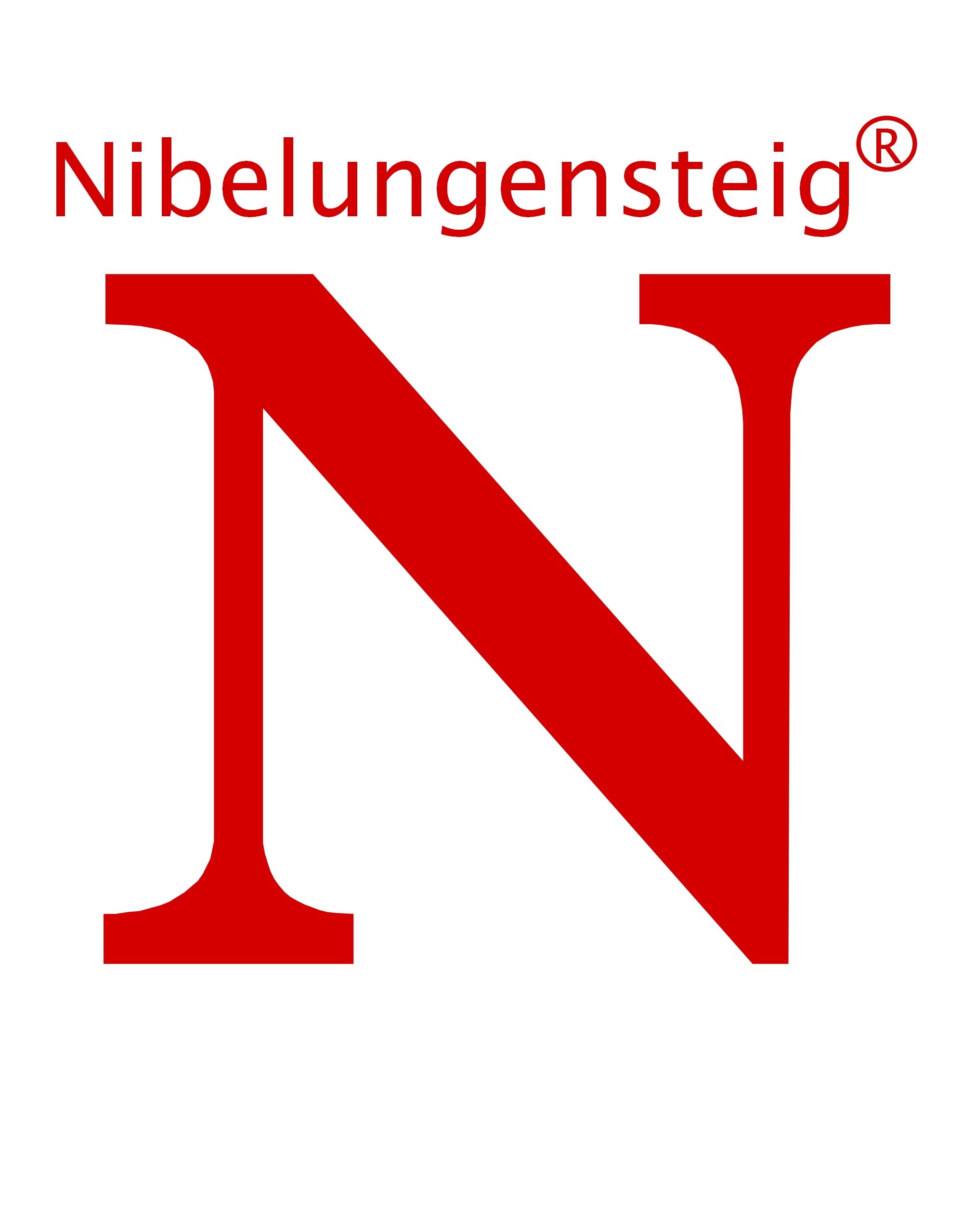
- Sign
- Length: 130 km (81 mi)
- Location: Odenwald, Germany
- Trailheads: Zwingenberg (Bergstraße), Freudenberg (Main), numerous places in between
- Use: Hiking
- Elevation change: 4,000 metres (13,120 ft)
- Waymark: red "N" on white
- Website: http://www.nibelungenland.net/Qualitaetsweg-Nibelungensteig

The Nibelungensteig is a hiking trail in the German states of Hesse, Bavaria and Baden-Württemberg. It traverses the Odenwald, a hill range or Mittelgebirge located between the rivers Rhine and Main.

The trail starts in Zwingenberg (Bergstraße) and ends in Freudenberg (Main). It is 130 kilometers long, and features elevation changes totaling 4,000 meters. The Nibelungensteig mostly follows natural paths. It is named for the legendary Nibelungen.

== Waymark ==
The Nibelungensteig is labeled along the entire trail with a red “N” on a white background.

== History ==
In 2007 the Odenwaldklub was instructed to create a new hiking trail, the Nibelungensteig. The first 40 kilometers of the trail lead from Zwingenberg (Bergstraße) to Grasellenbach (Odenwald). That first section is put together out of local loop trails and was officially opened in October 2008.

In April 2010, around 90 kilometers were added to the first 40 kilometers of the Nibelungensteig. The now 130 kilometers make up the complete trail, leading from Zwingenberg (Bergstraße) to Freudenberg (Main).

In January 2012, the Nibelungensteig was certified as Qualitätsweg Wanderbares Deutschland (Quality Walking in Germany) by the German Mountain and Walking Clubs Association.

== Route ==
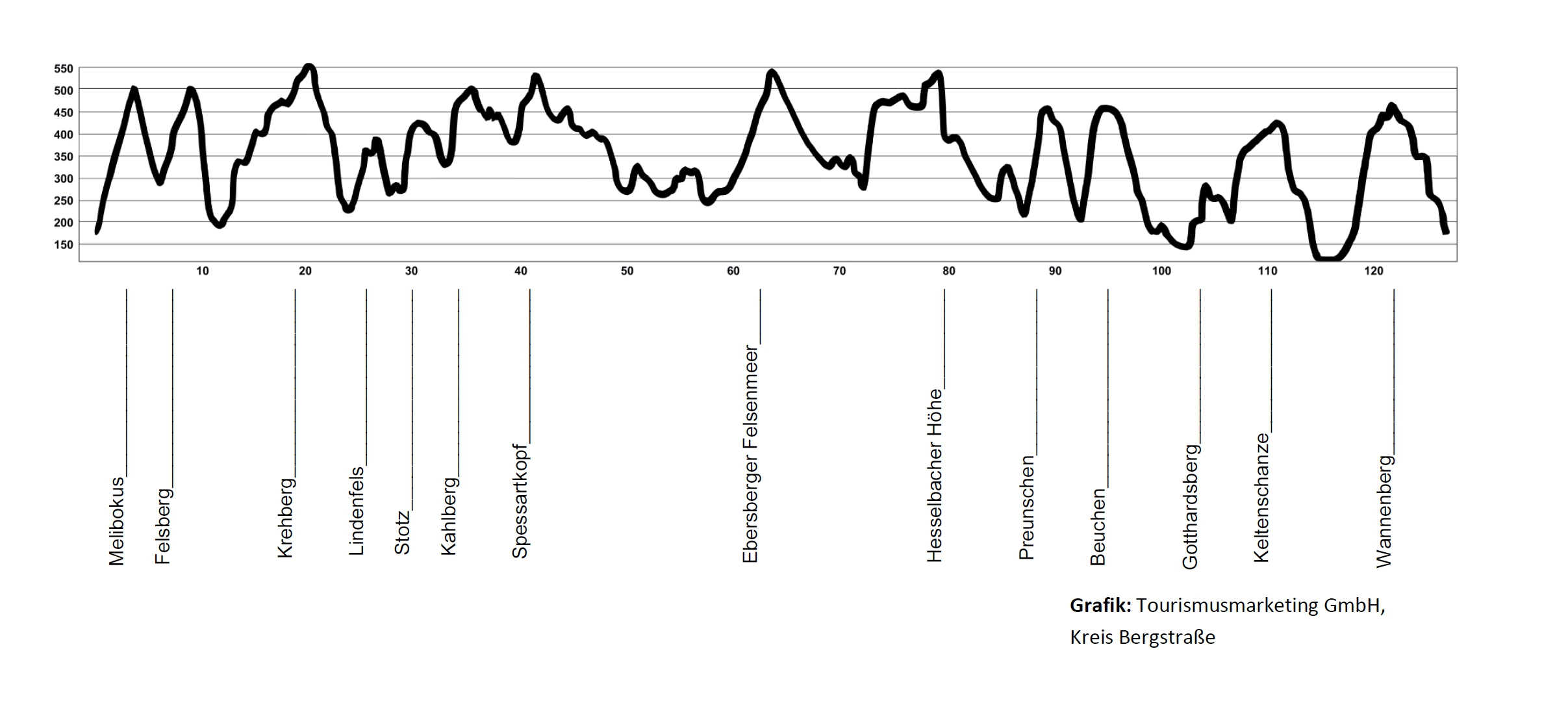
Elevation profile

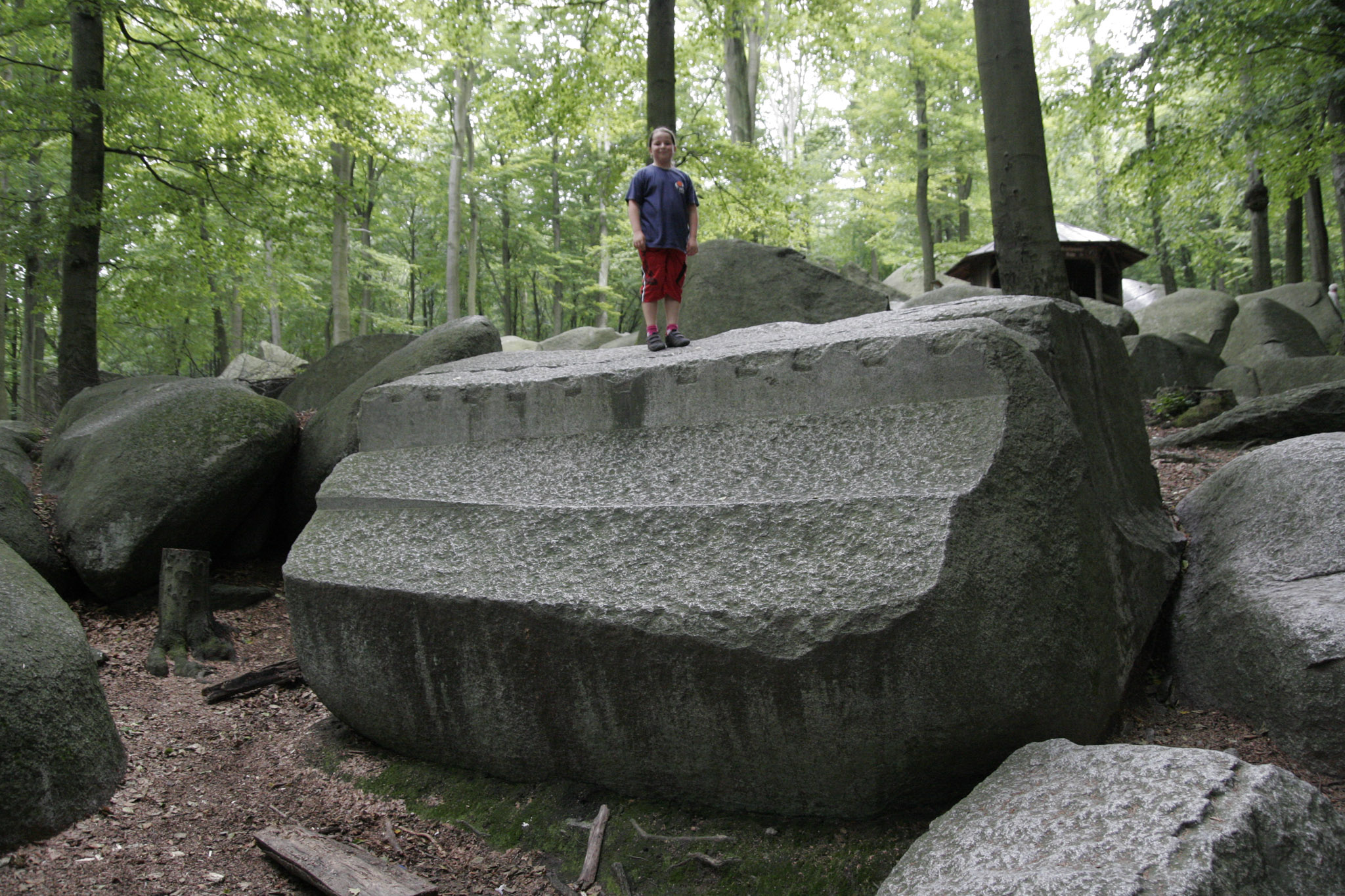
Felsenmeer in Lautertal

Three feeder paths lead from Worms, which is a central setting of the Nibelungensage. The paths lead through the Hessian Ried to the Nibelungensteig. The three feeder paths include two biking routes (the biking route “north” and the biking route “south”), and one hiking trail.

The first section of the Nibelungensteig is divided into three legs that are between 12 and 15 kilometers long. The first leads from Zwingenberg (Bergstraße) over the Melibokus hill and the Felsberg hill. At the base of the Felsberg lies the Felsenmeer (“rock chaos” or “sea of rocks”) to Reichenbach. The second leg passes by the Hohenstein, a quartzite rock popular with rock climbers, and Lindenfels. From there the third leg leads to one of the so-called Siegfried's spring (Siegfriedbrunnen), near Grasellenbach. Out of all the Siegfried's springs in the Odenwald, at which Siegfried was supposedly assassinated by Hagen, the one near Grasellenbach is the best known. Another of the springs is the Zittenfeldener Quelle (spring of Zittenfeld).

The extension of the Nibelungensteig from 2010 leads through towns like Amorbach and Miltenberg. It also passes landmarks like the Marbach reservoir, the Himbächel viaduct, and the Ebersberger Felsenmeer (rock chaos of Ebersberg). Furthermore, the trail passes the Quellkirche (wellspring church), a former pilgrimage site in Schöllenbach, and a pilgrimage church in Hesselbach (Hesseneck), which is dedicated to St. Luzia and St. Odilia.

Other notable sites along the route include:

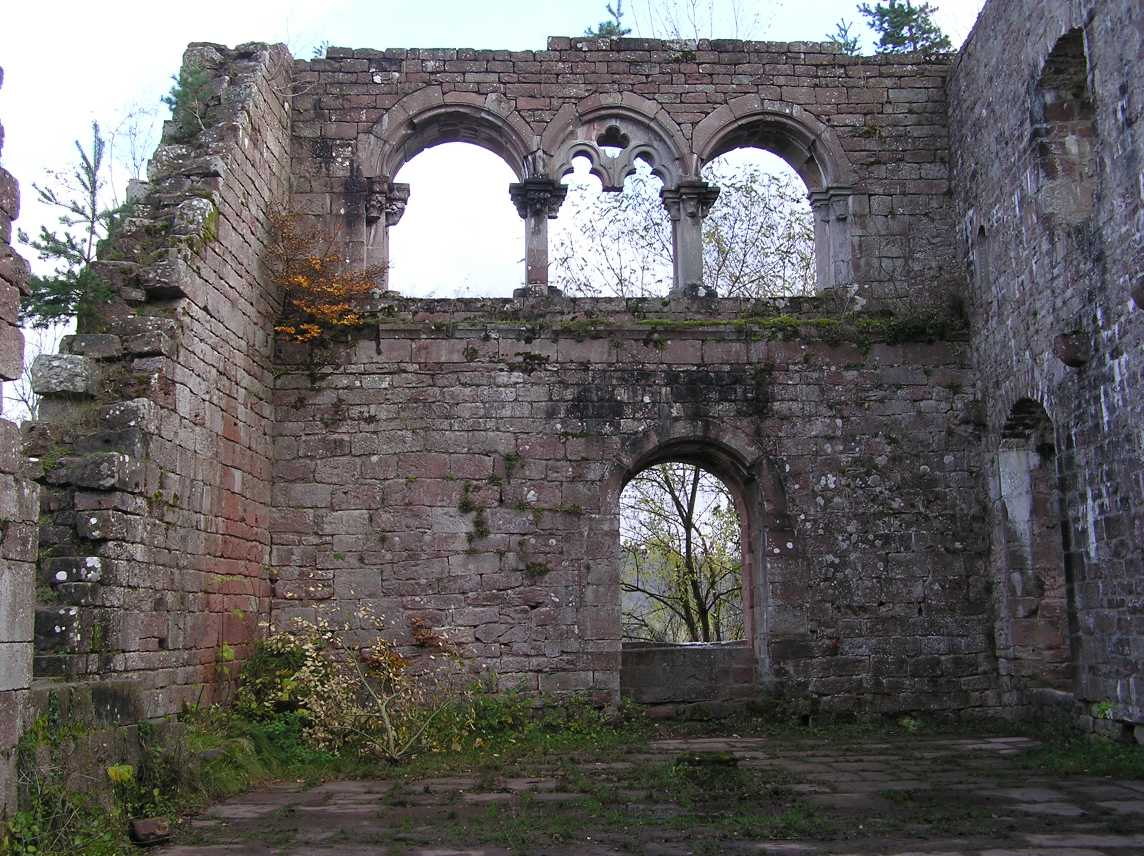
The residential quarters of Wildenberg Castle

- Wildenberg Castle, where Wolfram von Eschenbach supposedly wrote his knight epic Parzival
- the so-called Dreiländereck in Hesseneck where the three German states Baden-Württemberg, Bavaria and Hesse meet
- Amorbach Abbey in the Baroque town of Amorbach
- at Bürgstadt, the Martinskapelle, whose furniture includes the so-called Bilderbibel (picture bible) and
- the Centgrafenkapelle (tithe counts’ chapel), a ruined building which was never finished as a consequence of the Thirty Years' War
- Freudenberg Castle

== Nibelungensteig-Marathon ==
The Nibelungensteig-Marathon is a so-called ultramarathon, i.e. its distance of 53 kilometers is longer than the usual distance for marathons. The marathon has been taking place once a year, mostly in the fall, since 2008. The runners have to overcome approximately 1,400 meters elevation gain.
