= Steig =

Narrow footpath over mountains or hills

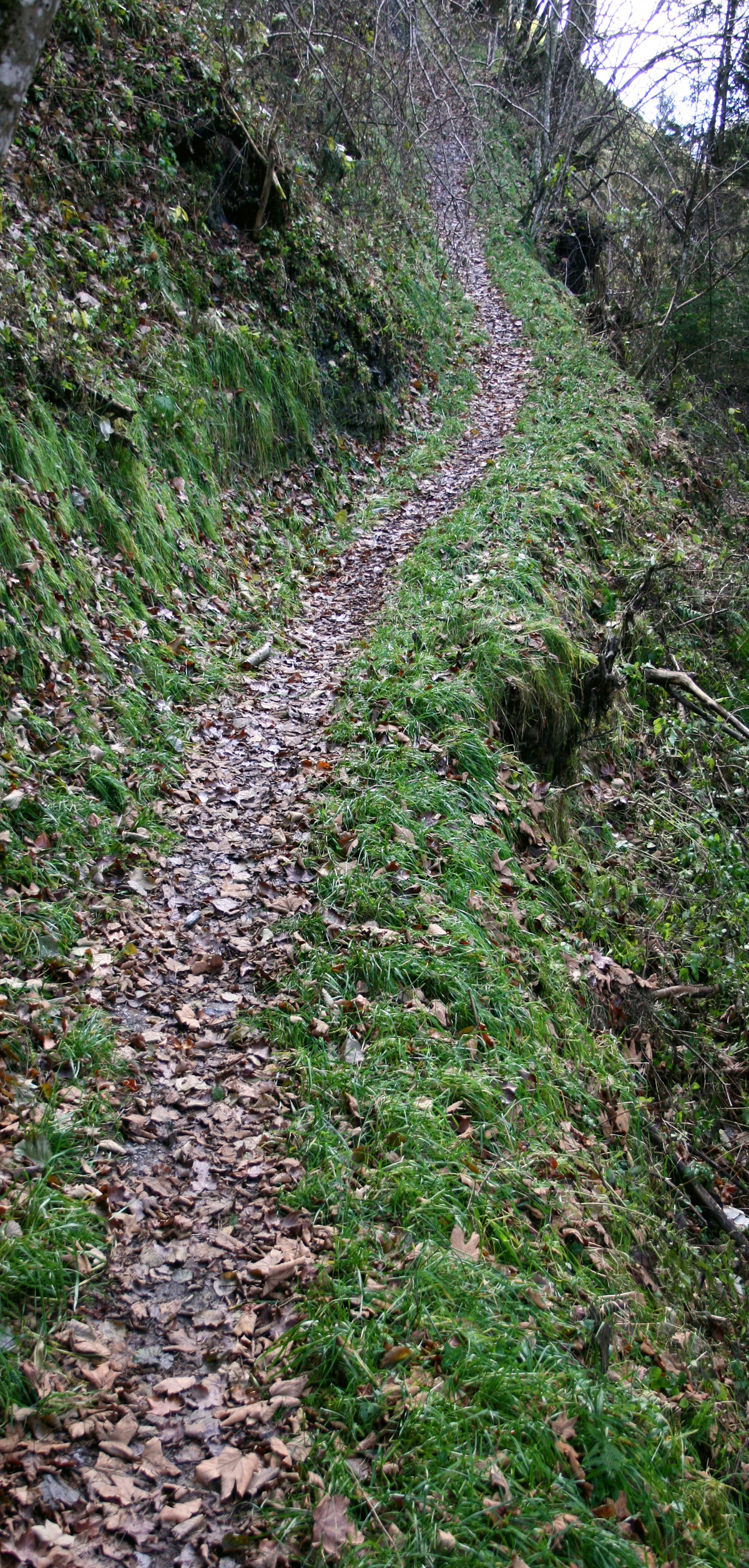
A steig near Großarl

A steig (Low German: Stieg) is a German term meaning "trail in hilly terrain" or "steep path" that originally referred to a narrow footpath over hills or mountains that could not be negotiated by horse-drawn vehicles. Today the term occurs in German-speaking countries as a synonym for all kinds of footpaths, e.g., Bürgersteig, a term for "pavement" in Austria or Switzerland. The term steig and its dialectical variations is commonly found in many placenames. The plural of steig is steige.

== Mountain paths and hiking trails ==
Steige in hill or mountain areas often run over exposed or rocky terrain, and are more uneven than normal footpaths. They should only be attempted with mountaineering boots or high sports shoes, which extend above the ankles (to reduce the risk of going over on one's ankle).

On hiking maps and large-scale topographical maps (typically 1:50,000 scale) in Germany, Austria and Switzerland, steige and klettersteige are usually portrayed by short dashes or dotted lines, while wider tracks are often indicated by longer dashes (cart tracks may also be portrayed by dots and dashes).

Popular climbing mountains often have several steige on each side (see e.g. the Rax, Hochkönig or Zugspitze). Regional books, websites, climbing and hiking guides give more detailed information on the routes and elevations, the opening times of mountain huts and the duration of walks. They may also identify and describe potential emergency exit routes.

Narrow or steep paths through a gorge or leading to other tourist attractions such as old mines, nature trails, waterfalls etc. are called steige. Those that are especially popular are almost always secured with ropes, steps, ladders or small footbridges.

== Examples ==
The suffix -steig or -stieg is often used nowadays in the names of major long distance paths of tourist significance. German examples include:

- Eifelsteig, long distance trail in the Eifel mountains
- Harzer Hexenstieg, 100-km-long footpath through the Harz Mountains
- Nibelungensteig, 124-km-long trail in the Odenwald
- Rennsteig, 170-km-long ridgeway in Central Germany
- Rheinsteig, 320-km-long trail along the Rhine
- Rothaarsteig, 154-km-long ridgeway along the Rothaar Mountains

== See also ==
- Klettersteig
- Mountain pass
