= Freudenberg (Baden) =

- Town
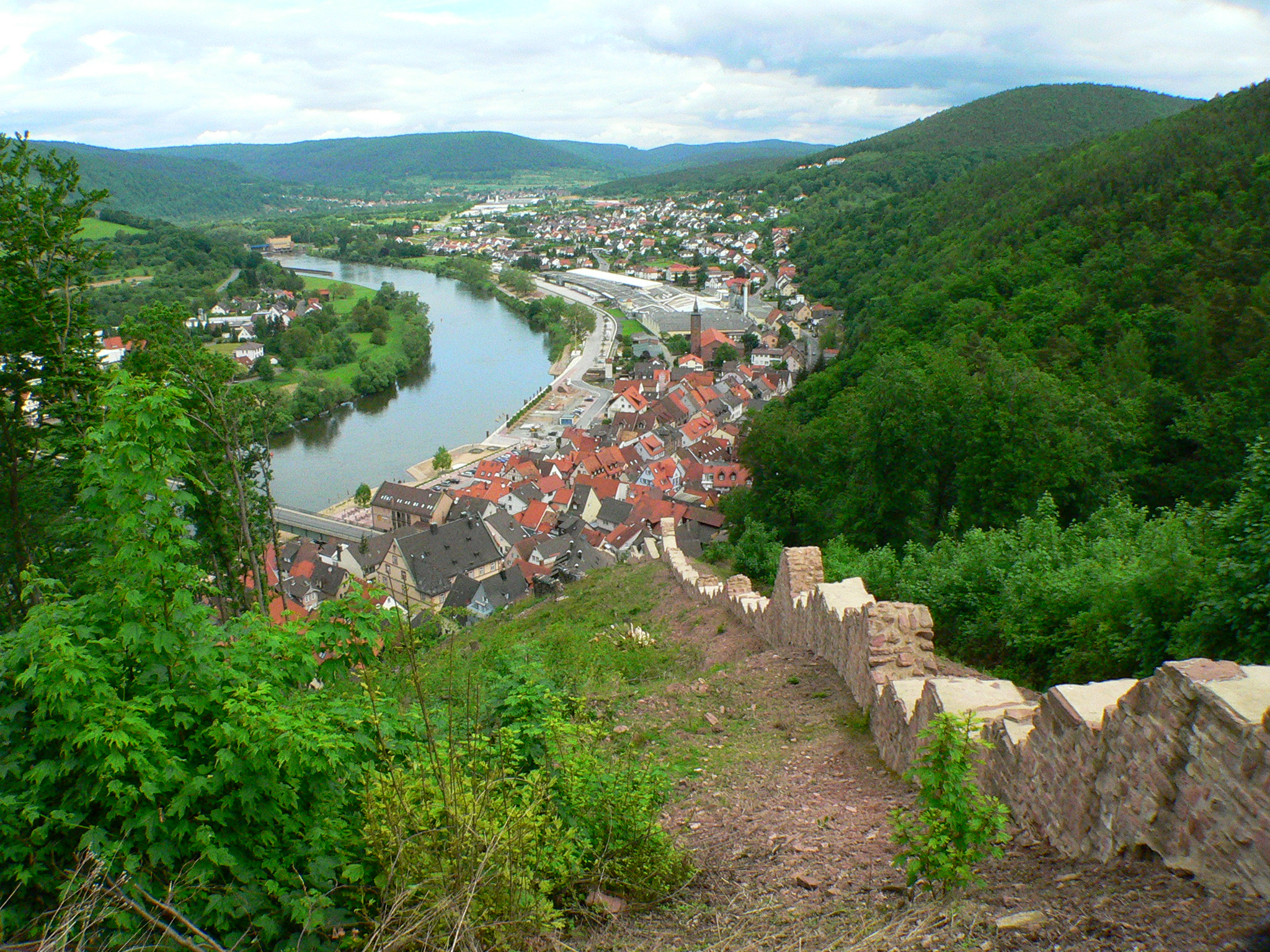
- Freudenberg viewed from the castle

- Coat of arms

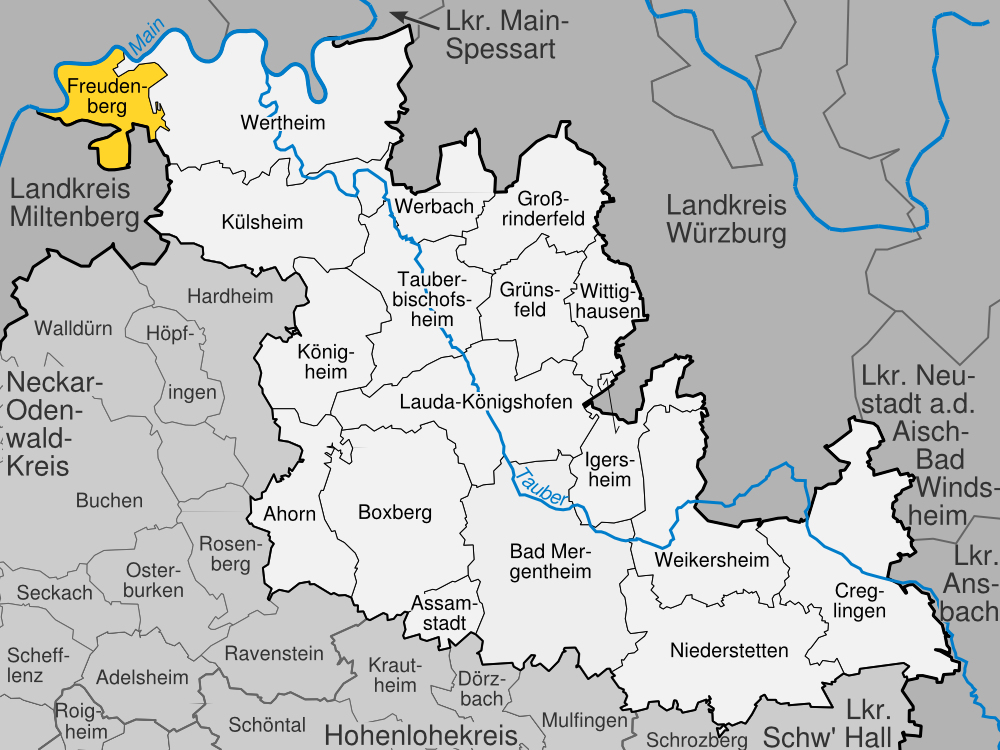
- Location of Freudenberg within Main-Tauber-Kreis district
- Interactive map of Freudenberg
- Location within Germany Location within Baden-Württemberg
- Coordinates: 49°45′N 9°20′E
- Country: Germany
- State: Baden-Württemberg
- Admin. region: Stuttgart
- District: Main-Tauber-Kreis

Government
  - Mayor (2022–30): Roger Henning

Area
  - Total: 34.78 km^{2} (13.43 sq mi)
- Elevation: 133 m (436 ft)

Population (2025-12-31)
  - Total: 3,570
  - Density: 103/km^{2} (266/sq mi)
- Time zone: UTC+01:00 (CET)
  - Summer (DST): UTC+02:00 (CEST)
- Postal codes: 97896
- Dialling codes: 09375 / 09377 / 09378
- Vehicle registration: TBB, MGH
- Website: www.freudenberg-main.de

Freudenberg (pronounced [ˈfʁɔʏdn̩ˌbɛʁk]; also: Freudenberg am Main) is a town and a municipality in the district Main-Tauber-Kreis, in Baden-Württemberg, Germany. It is situated on the river Main and has a population around 3,700.

== Geography ==
=== Location ===
Freudenberg is located in the extreme northeast of the state of Baden-Württemberg, on the left bank of the river Main which here is the border to Bavaria. Across the river is the municipality of Collenberg. The old town of Freudenberg faces Kirschfurt, an Ortsteil of Collenberg. Freudenberg lies approximately 15 km west of Wertheim am Main, and 30 km south-east of Aschaffenburg.

Freudenberg is the terminus of the hiking path Nibelungensteig which starts at Zwingenberg (Bergstrasse). It is also located on the Nibelungenstraße, a tourist route from Worms to Wertheim. The hills on the left bank of the Main are part of the Mittelgebirge Odenwald while those on the opposite side of the river belong to the Spessart. The municipal territory totals 3,478 hectares and stretches far into the wooded hills.

=== Subdivisions ===
Freudenberg has the Stadtteile Boxtal, Ebenheid, Rauenberg and Wessental in addition to Freudenberg town proper.

== History ==
Freudenberg was first mentioned around 1100.

In 1803, the Reichsdeputationshauptschluss awarded Freudenberg to the House of Löwenstein-Wertheim-Freudenberg. Mondfeld, Rauenberg and Wessental (previously ruled by Mainz) became part of Amt Freudenberg. In 1806, Freudenberg became a part of the Grand Duchy of Baden.

In 1907, the first (sandstone) bridge over the Main was built. In 1928–34, the Staustufe Freudenberg followed.

In 1935, with the Deutsche Gemeindeordnung and the laws that followed, Freudenberg lost its status as town. A year later, the Bezirksamt Wertheim was dissolved. Freudenberg became a part of the Amtsbezirk/Landkreis Tauberbischofsheim (part of the Regierungsbezirk Karlsruhe).

Towards the end of World War II, the first Main bridge was blown up. From 1946 to 1950, a ferry boat linked Kirschfurt and Freudenberg. In 1950, the second (current) bridge was built.

In 1955, Freudenberg asked the Interior Minister of Baden-Württemberg for a reinstatement of the status of town. This was confirmed in February 1956. Six years later, Freudenberg was awarded the current municipal coat of arms.

In 1968, Freudenberg and Boxtal became publicly recognized resorts. On 1 January 1972, as a result of Gebietsreform Boxtal, Ebenheid and Wessental were merged to Freudenberg, followed by Rauenberg on 31 December. In 1973, the Tauberbischofsheim district was abolished and Freudenberg has since been a part of the Main-Tauber-Kreis.

== Demographics ==
View chart definition.

== Economy ==
Notable businesses in the town include Rauch Möbelwerke, a furniture manufacturing company, established in 1897.

Freudenberg also hosts the high-end distillery Brennerei Ziegler, which has been manufacturing spirits since 1865.

== Attractions ==
Rauch have, as part of their plant, a zoo which the public are free to visit. The zoo exhibits many exotic animals such as monkeys, zebras and kangaroos.

- Burg Freudenberg, a castle ruin above the town
