= Auerbach Castle =

Fortress in Hesse, Germany

Coordinates: 49°42′33″N 8°37′55″E

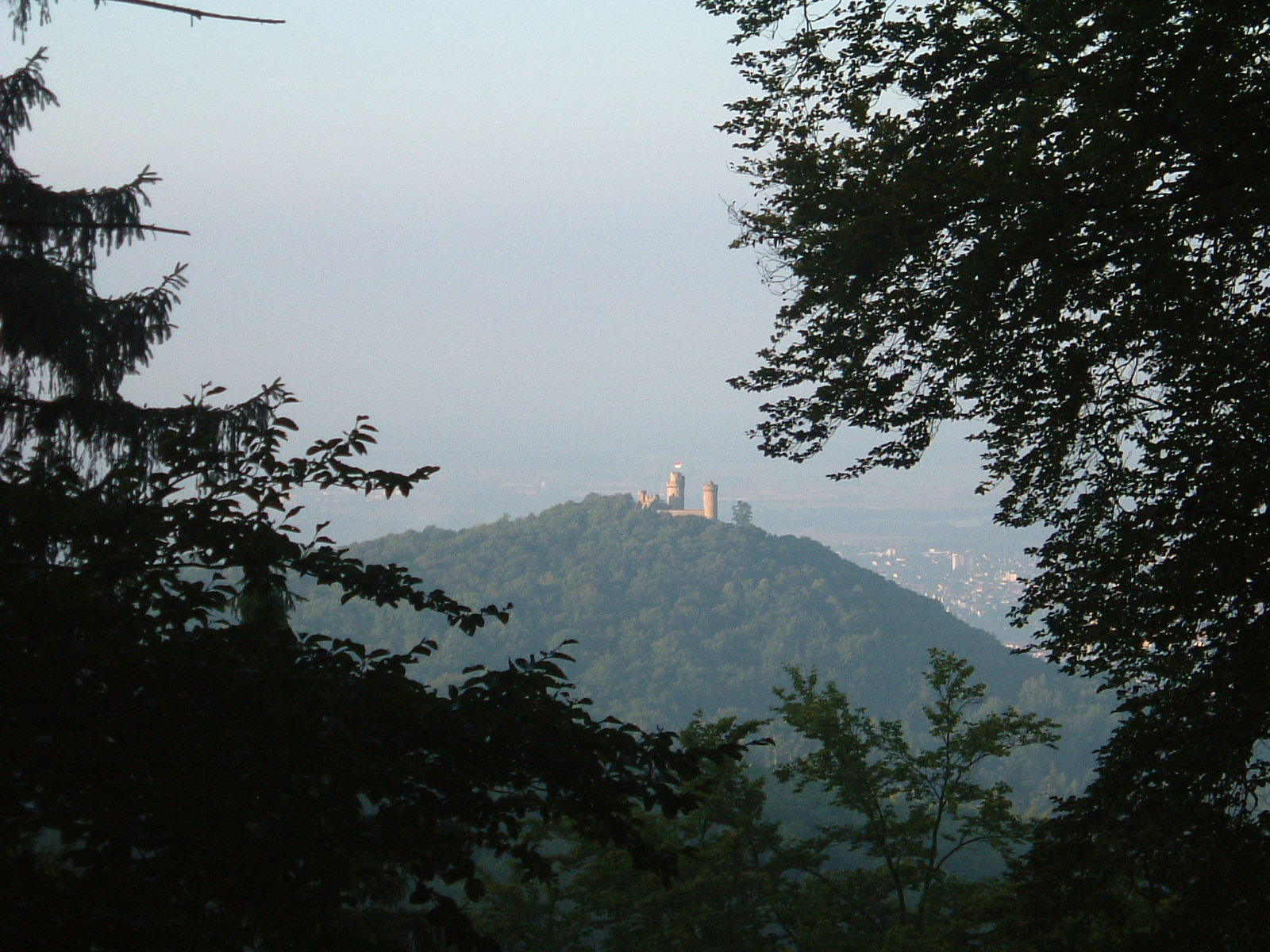
View of Auerbach Castle from Melibokus, overlooking Bensheim

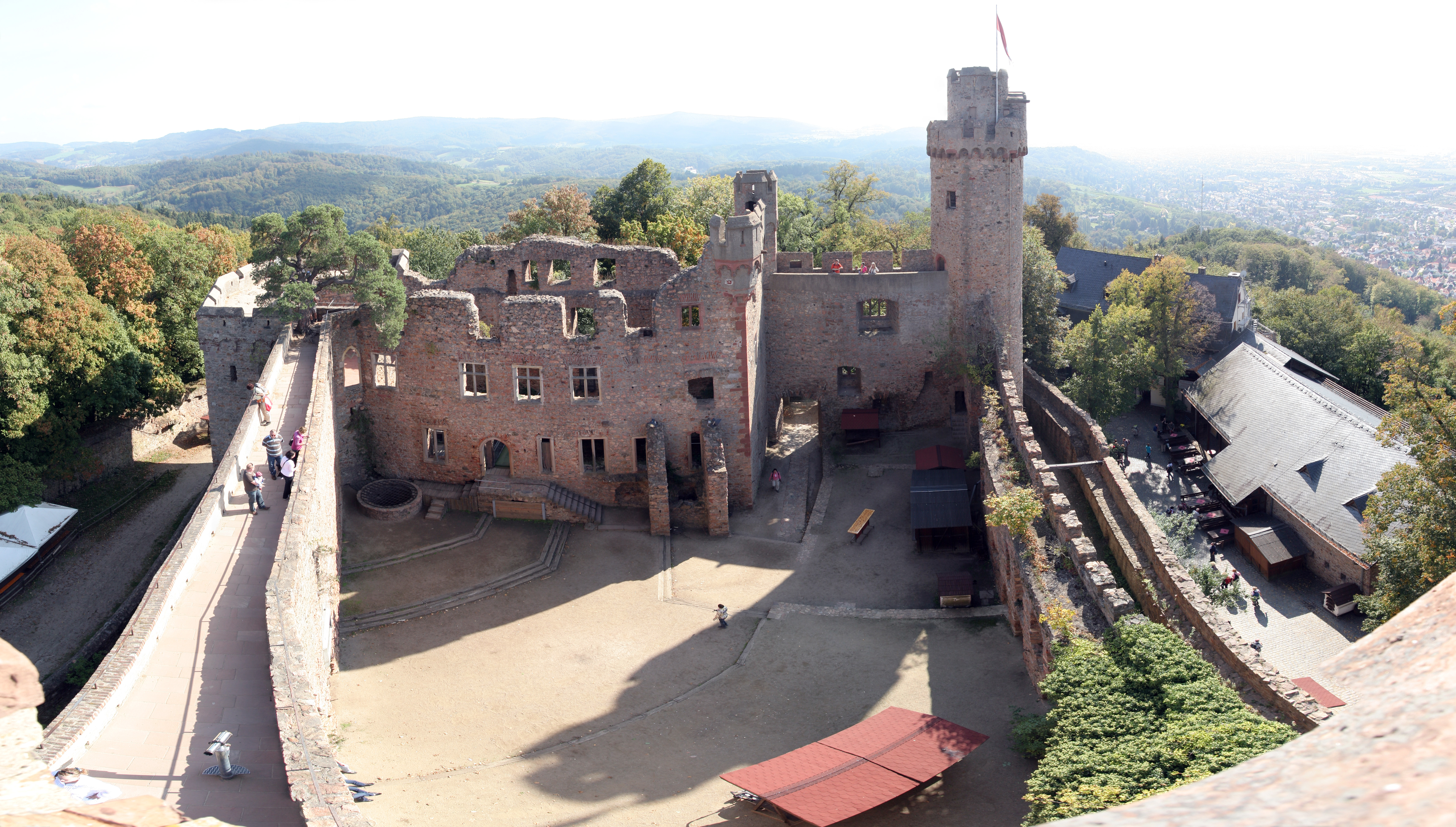
Auerbach Castle seen from the north tower (180° panorama). Left is the Scotch pine on the castle wall; right is the south tower.

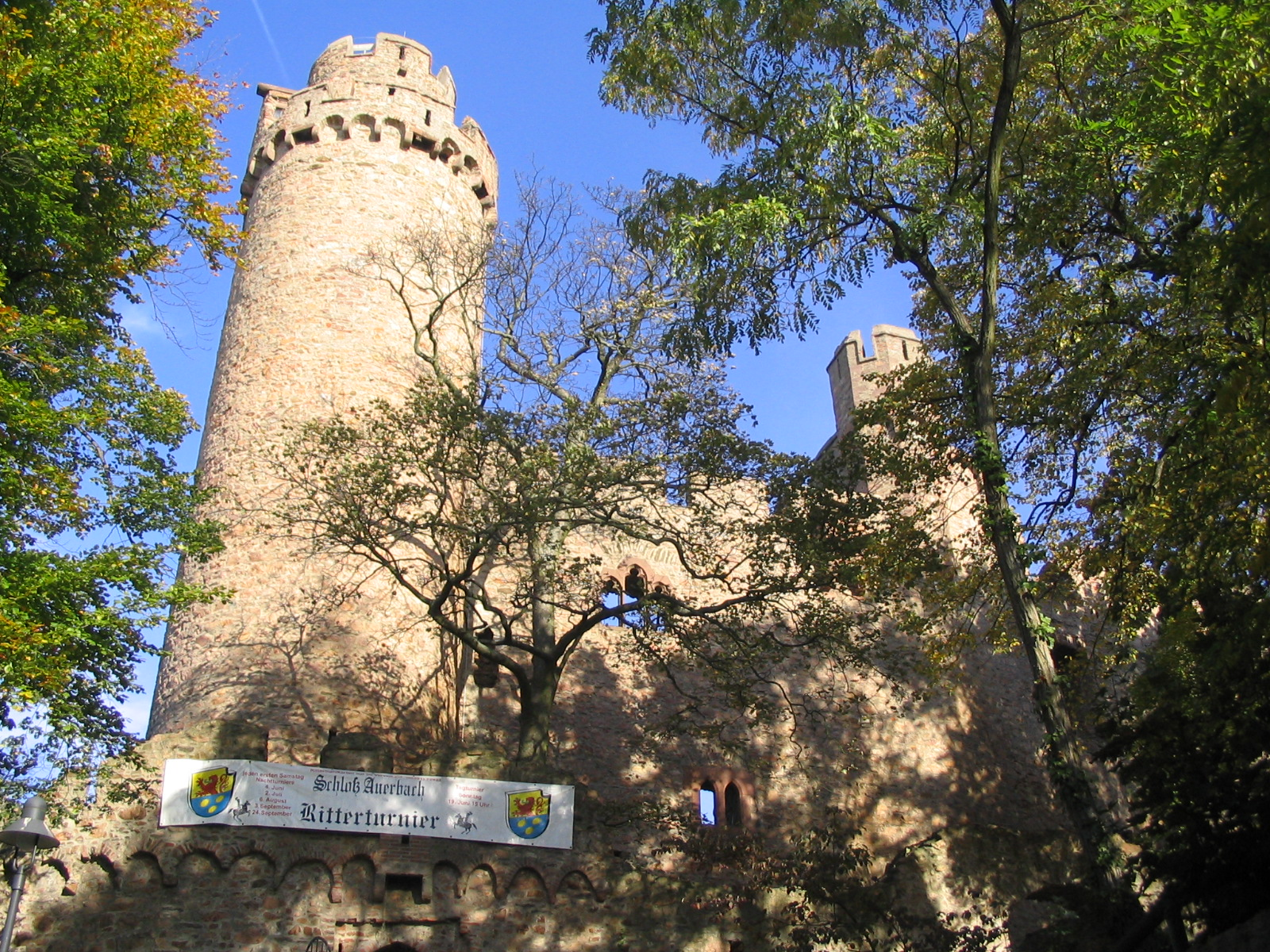
Exterior view

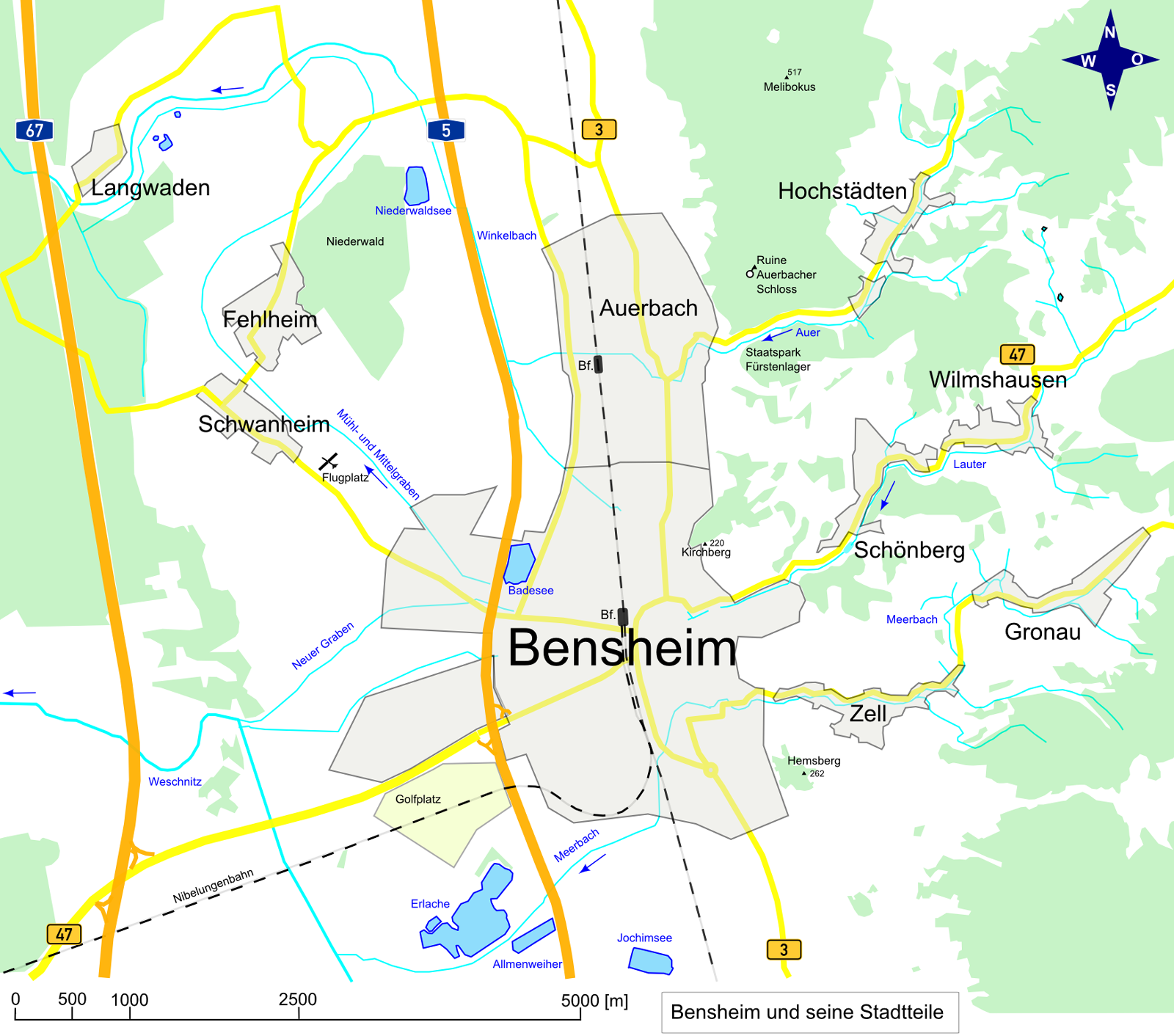
Map of Bensheim, showing the castle east of Auerbach

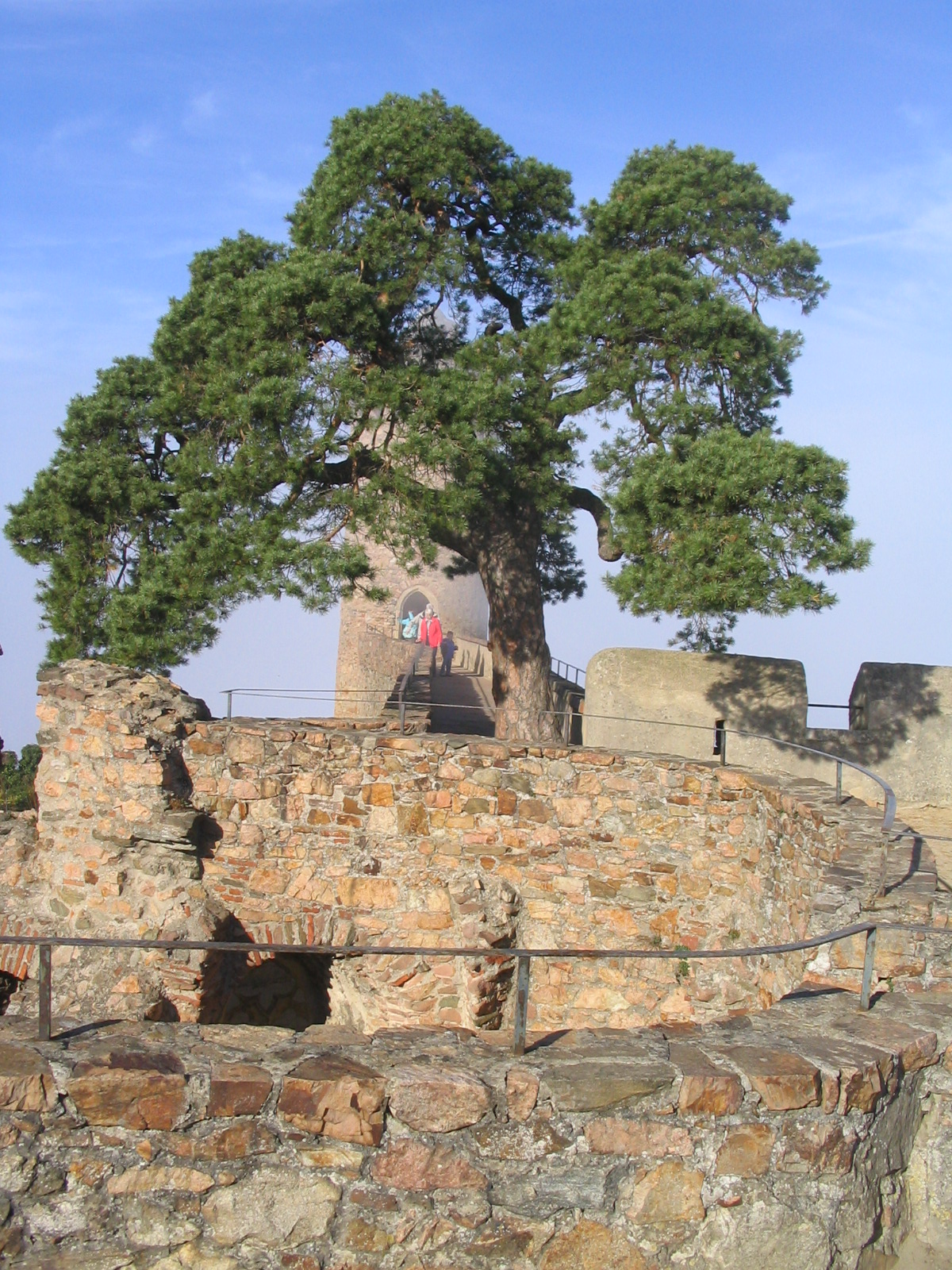
Pine on castle wall near north tower

Auerbach Castle is one of several fortresses along the Bergstrasse in southern Hesse, Germany. The castle was originally built by King Charlemagne (Emperor of the Holy Roman Empire) and rebuilt by Count Diether IV of the Katzenelnbogen dynasty in the second quarter of the 13th century. Today it remains standing atop a hill known as Urberg (part of the Melibokus) above the town of Bensheim-Auerbach.

== History ==
The town of Auerbach (Bensheim) was mentioned for the first time in the Lorsch codex as "Urbach". Through the marriage of Hildegard von Henneberg, areas of the Bergstraße passed to Henry II of Katzenelnbogen in 1135. Henry was ennobled as an earl in 1138 by King Konrad III. At that time, Auerbach belonged to the County of Katzenelnbogen. Katzenelnbogen was sub-divided into the Lower County (around St. Goar on the Rhine) and the Upper County (in what is now southern Hesse, south of the Main).

A stronghold was needed to provide security for the southern Katzenelnbogen dynasty; this included protection of the duties (tolls) collected at the town of Zwingenberg from travellers using the well-known north-south trading route along the Roman mountain road (Strada Montana, or Bergstrasse in German). Auerbach Castle was built on the strategically important Auerberg (Urberg) hill to address this need. Construction of the castle is believed to have begun about 1222 by the order of Earl Diether IV von Katzenelnbogen. The earliest mention of a castle on Urberg in the historical record appears in 1247, and the first document of the castle itself dates from 1257. In 1479 County Katzenelnbogen (including Auerbach Castle) passed to the Landgraviate of Hesse.

The castle lost much of its strategic importance during the 16th century until, by the time of the Thirty Years War, it was no longer in military use. In 1674 (during the 1672–1679 Franco-Dutch War) the castle was conquered and set afire by an army under French Marshal Turenne, killing local people who had sought protection within its walls. The abandoned castle became a ruin over the following years.

In 1820 the north tower of the castle collapsed, after which the Landgraviate of Hesse decided to secure (and partially rebuild) the ruins. In 1888 an inn was built in the former bailey, which was open year-round.

During the 1950s, the south tower became inaccessible due to the deterioration of its wooden staircase. In 1989, construction began on a terraced restaurant; it opened the following year, increasing the attraction of the castle ruins to visitors. In 2007, the stairway in the south tower was repaired and reopened to the public.

== Viniculture ==
In 1258 a vineyard called the Grafenweinberg was recorded, and in 1318 one called the Reubere. There is still viticulture at the site today.

== Design ==
The triangular shape of the castle keep survives today. Between the wall (from the north to the south tower) and the inner courtyard were the kitchens, living quarters, stables and smithy. The original entrance, protected by a donjon, was in the wall between the north and former east tower. Between the wall (from the east to the south tower) and the inner courtyard were the grand hall, cellars and the castle chapel.

In the east corner of the inner courtyard lies the original well, drilled through 62 metres (203 feet) of bedrock. The castle keep is surrounded by a ring wall which encloses the bailey. A further forecourt is enclosed by another ring wall. At the south side of this ring wall was the entrance to the estate. On 18 October 1356, a powerful earthquake shook the Rhine rift; the donjon collapsed onto the eastern and southeastern buildings. Beginning about 1370, large-scale reconstruction and expansion of the castle took place. The donjon was demolished, the entrance to the keep relocated and the northern shield wall was closed and raised. The entrance to the castle is now in the southwest corner, where it is protected by the south tower and an inner bailey.

A 4-metre (13-foot)-thick bastion was built in place of the east tower. This bastion (the first of its kind in Germany) was designed to protect the castle from cannon bombardment from the northeast. The north and south towers may have been raised at this time. These additional fortifications, ordered by the Counts of Katzenelnbogen, gave rise to the name Feste Urberg (Urberg Fort) and made Auerbach one of the most secure and modern castles in the world at that time.

== Present day ==
Dinner theater and knights' tournaments (with medieval games) are regular features at the castle. Since spring 2007 the north and south towers are accessible to the public after extensive restoration.
