= Zwingenberg (Bergstraße) station =

Railway station in Hesse, Germany

Zwingenberg (Bergstr)
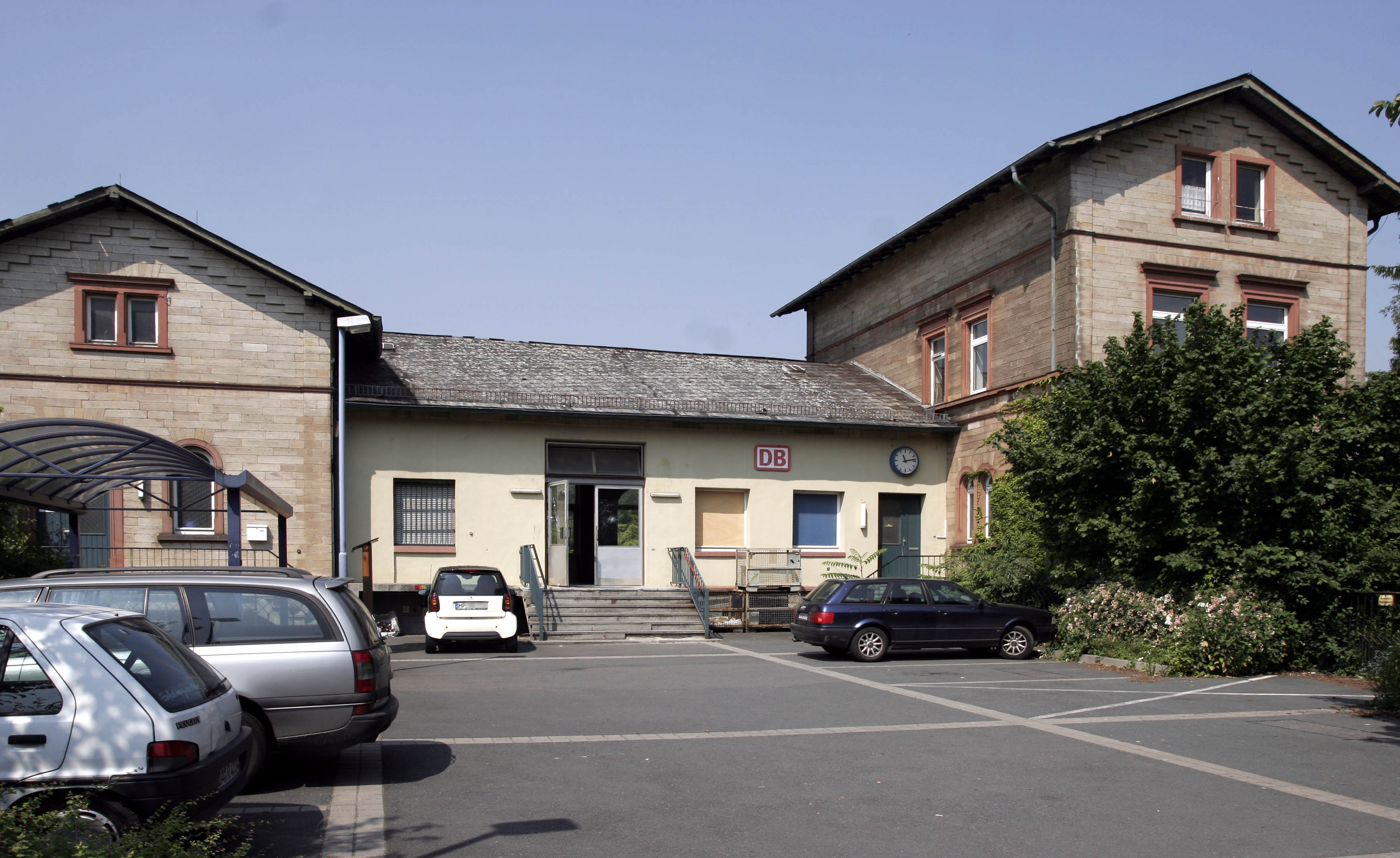

General information
- Location: Bahnhofstr. 25, Zwingenberg, Hesse; Germany
- Coordinates: 49°43′32″N 8°36′33″E
- Line: Main-Neckar Railway (44.5 km) (KBS 650)
- Platforms: 2

Construction
- Accessible: Yes
- Architect: Georg Moller

Other information
- Station code: 7075
- DS100 code: FZW
- IBNR: 08006687
- Category: 5
- Fare zone: VRN: 35; : 4510 (VRN transitional tariff)
- Website: www.bahnhof.de

History
- Opened: 1846

Services
Preceding station	DB Regio Mitte	Following station
Bickenbach towards Frankfurt (Main) Hbf	RE 60	Bensheim towards Mannheim Hbf
Hähnlein-Alsbach towards Frankfurt (Main) Hbf	RB 67	Bensheim-Auerbach towards Mannheim Hbf or Hockenheim
Hähnlein-Alsbach towards Frankfurt (Main) Hbf	RB 68	Bensheim-Auerbach towards Wiesloch-Walldorf
Location

Zwingenberg (Bergstraße) station is a station on the Main-Neckar Railway in the town of Zwingenberg on the Mountain Road in the German state of Hesse. It has a heritage-listed entrance building. The station is classified by Deutsche Bahn (DB) as a category 5 station.

== History ==
The station was opened in 1845/46 along with the Main-Neckar Railway between Frankfurt and Heidelberg.

The plans for the entrance building were probably drawn up by the Darmstadt court architect Georg Moller. Originally the station was built as a two-storey building with a roof turret. Years later, an extra storey was added. Similarly, two smaller buildings were added. The main building is built in yellow sandstone and has three floors. The division between the floors is marked by red sandstone. The windows are also framed in red sandstone. North of the building is the old walled garden of the former station master.

== Infrastructure ==
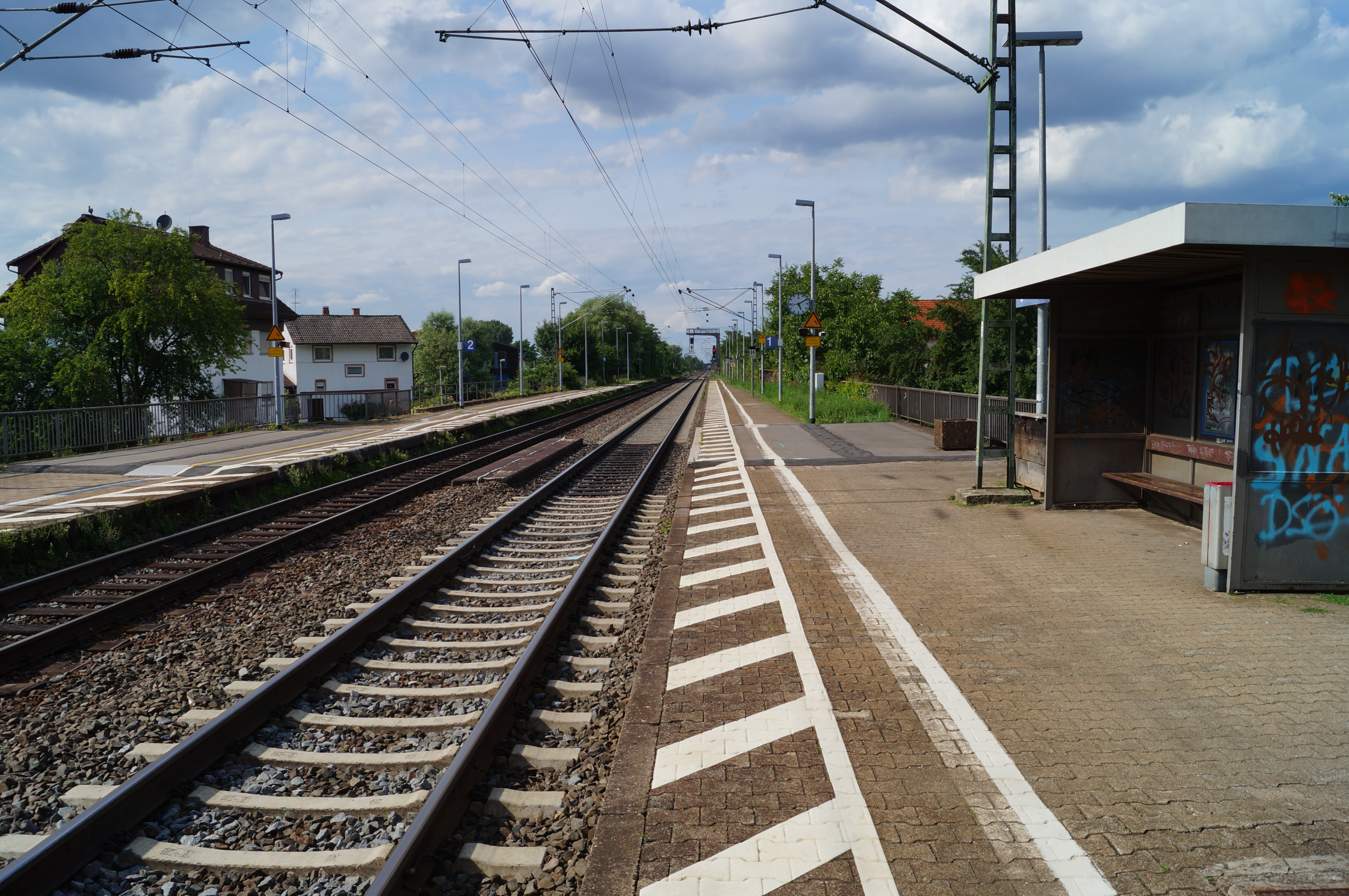
The platforms of Zwingenberg

The station is classified as a category 5 station. 44 Regionalbahn services stop in Zwingenberg each day.

In December 2007, Deutsche Bahn announced that it intended to sell the station building and shortly later that it had sold it to an investor.

A ticket machine is located only at the station building. Since the station is equipped with external platforms on the double-track line that are not directly connected by a pedestrian underpass, passengers heading south towards Bensheim or Heidelberg and who need to purchase a ticket must take into account the time needed to use the ticket machine and cross the tracks (about 8 minutes).

== Operations ==
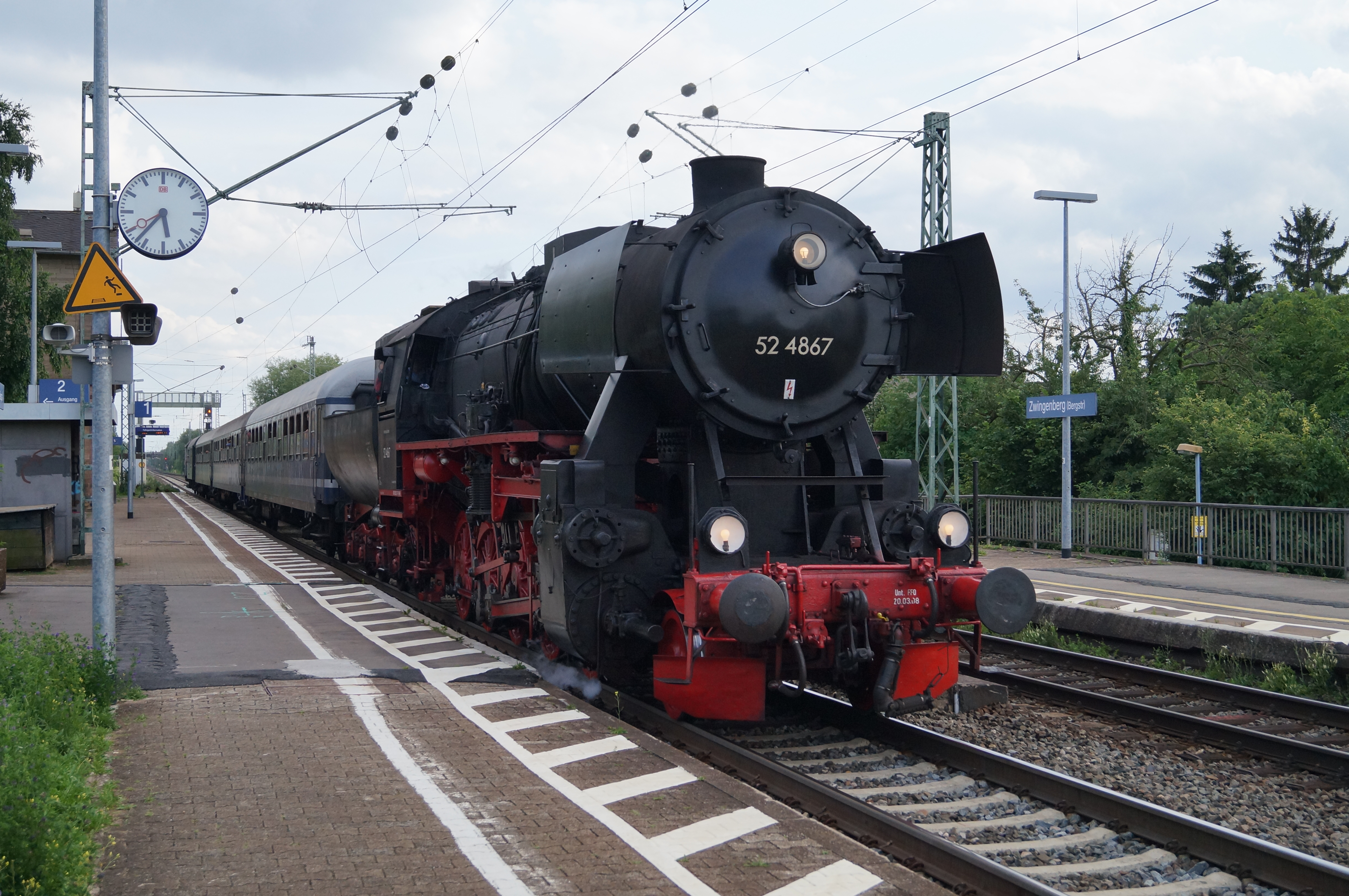
War locomotive of DRB Class 52 on the Main-Neckar Railway on its way to Frankfurt

The trains is served by the RB 68 Regionalbahn (stopping) service on the Heidelberg Hbf–Weinheim (Bergstr)–Zwingenberg–Bensheim–Darmstadt Hbf–Frankfurt (Main) Hbf route.
