= Zwingenberg, Hesse =

Zwingenberg
- Town
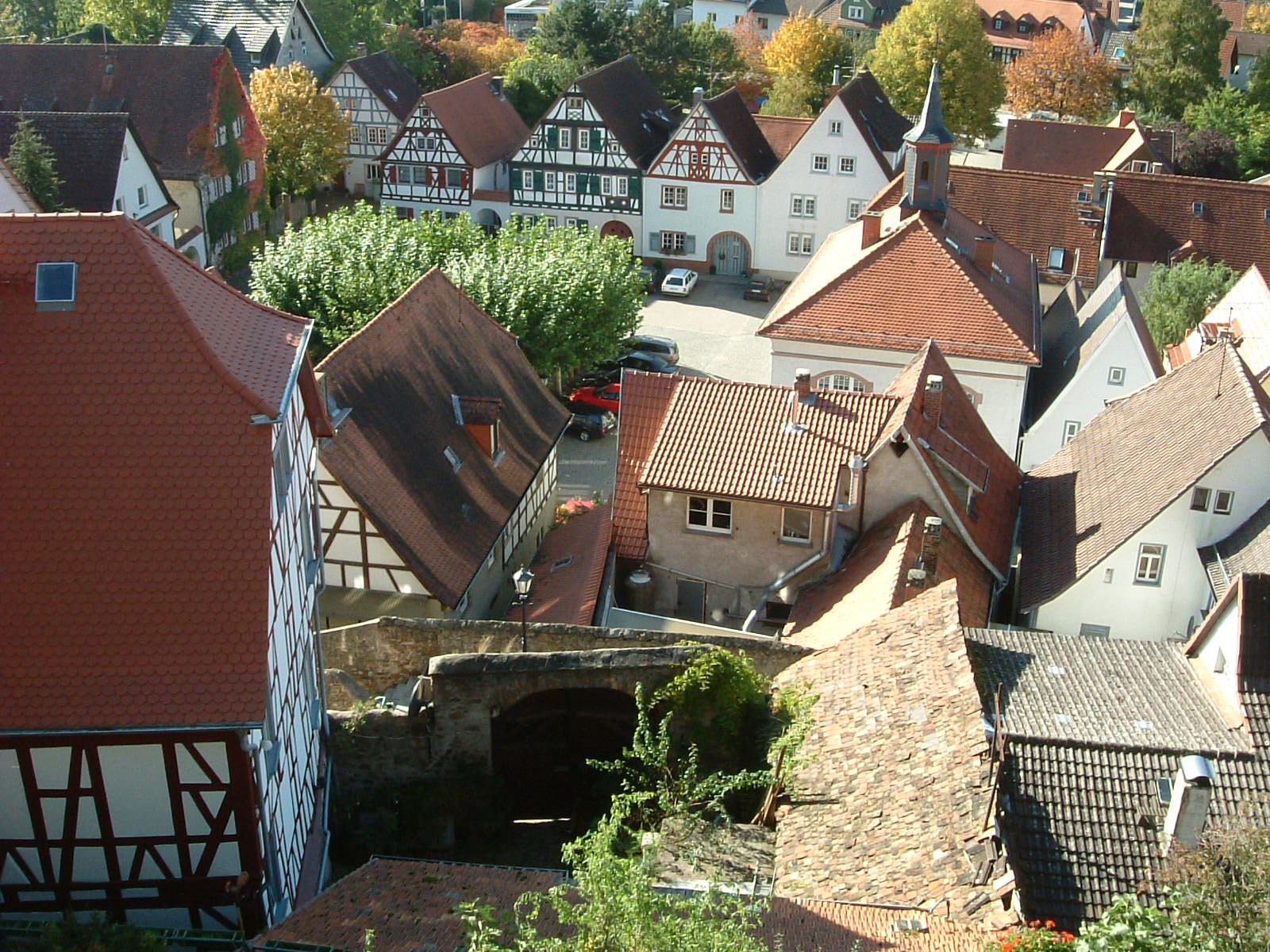

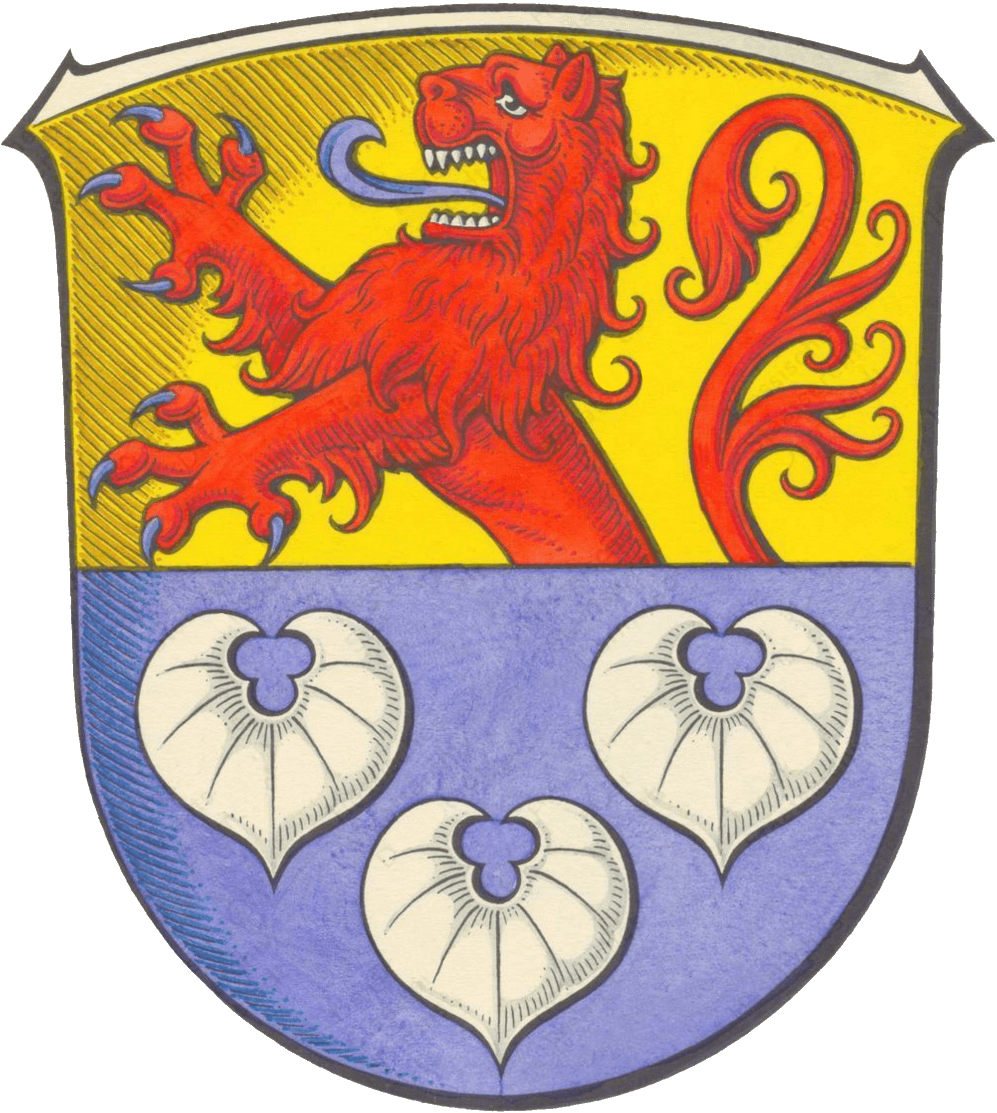
- Coat of arms

- Location of Zwingenberg within Bergstraße district
- Interactive map of Zwingenberg
- Location within Germany Location within Hesse
- Coordinates: 49°43′N 8°37′E
- Country: Germany
- State: Hesse
- Admin. region: Darmstadt
- District: Bergstraße

Government
  - Mayor (2025–31): Sebastian Clever (CDU)

Area
  - Total: 5.66 km^{2} (2.19 sq mi)
- Elevation: 100 m (330 ft)

Population (2025-12-31)
  - Total: 7,183
  - Density: 1,270/km^{2} (3,290/sq mi)
- Time zone: UTC+01:00 (CET)
  - Summer (DST): UTC+02:00 (CEST)
- Postal codes: 64673
- Dialling codes: 06251
- Vehicle registration: HP
- Website: www.zwingenberg.de

Zwingenberg (German pronunciation: [ˈtsvɪŋənˌbɛʁk]) lies in the Bergstraße district in southern Hessen, Germany, south of Frankfurt and Darmstadt, and with the granting of town rights coming in 1274 it is the oldest town on the Hessen Bergstraße.

== Geography ==
=== Location ===
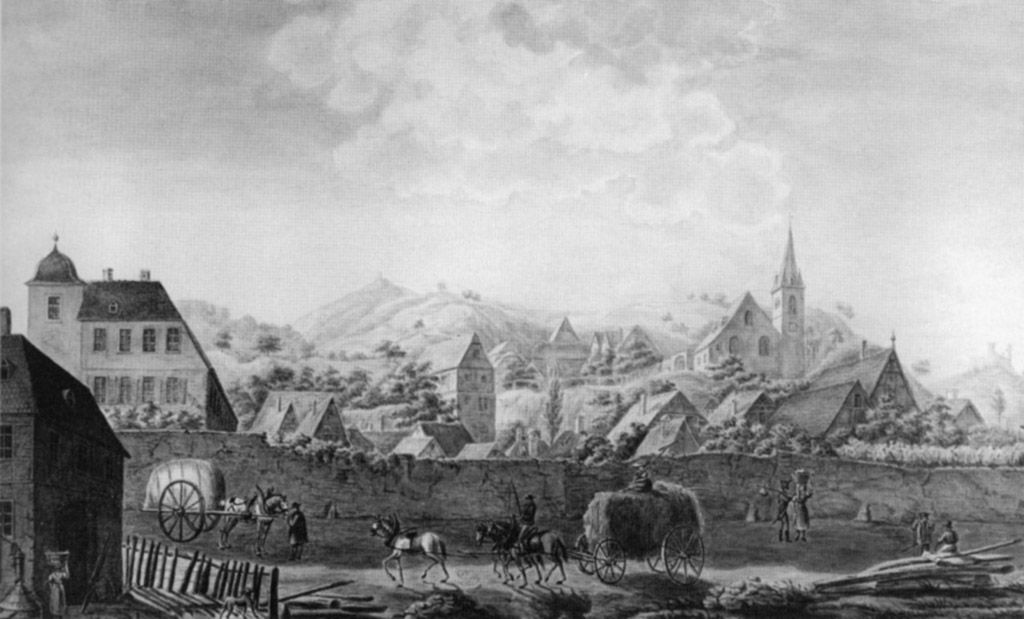
Zwingenberg about 1810 (painting by Wilhelm Merck)

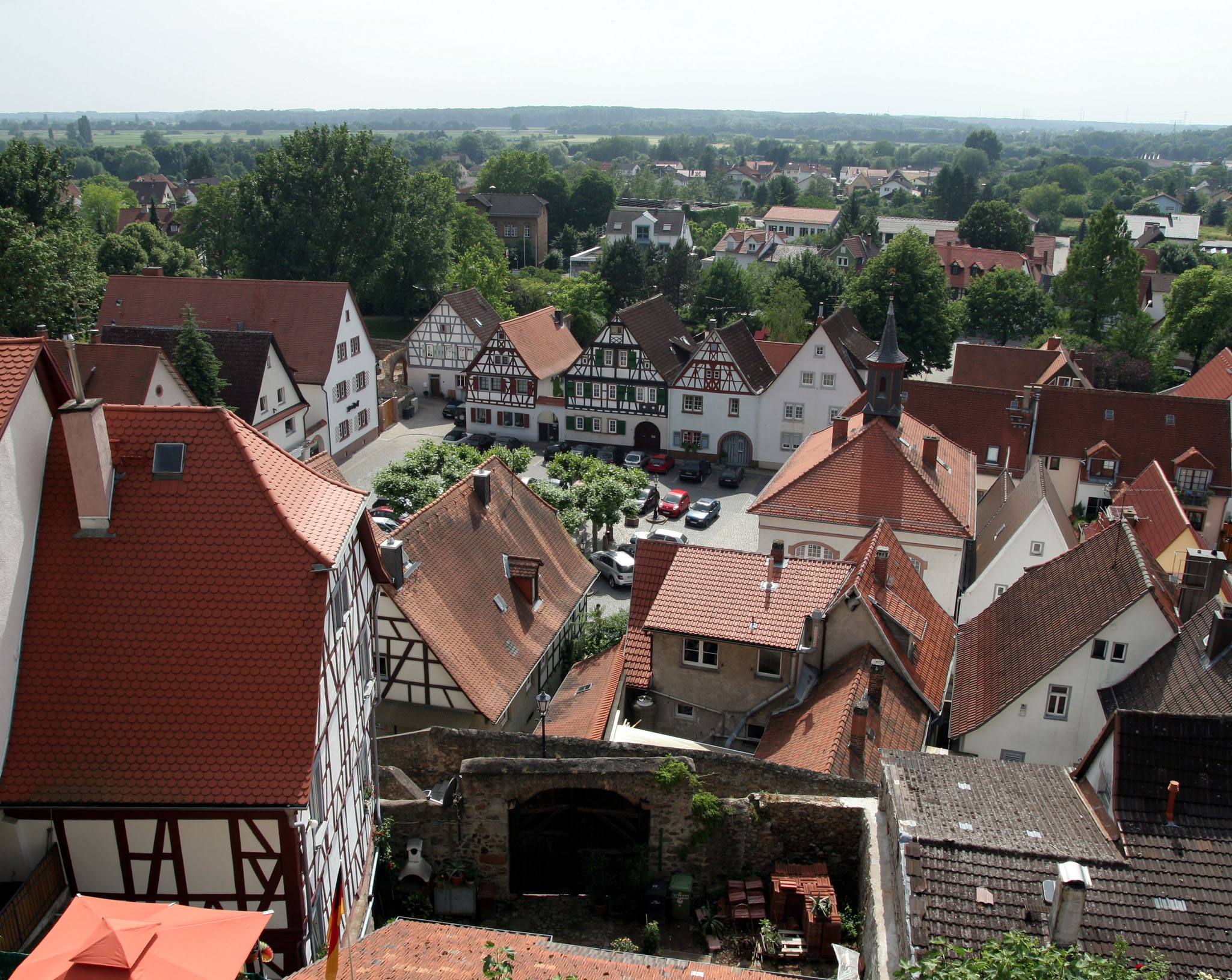
Zwingenberg's Old Town with the Marketplace

Zwingenberg lies on the western edge of the Odenwald at the foot of the Melibokus, at 517.4 m above sea level the Bergstraße's highest mountain. The municipal area's elevation varies between roughly 90 m above sea level in the outlying centre of Rodau and just under 300 m on the slope of the Melibokus. Zwingenberg's highest elevation is no one single mountain. Rather, it runs along the Melibokus's slope into the area of Auerbach, an outlying centre of Bensheim. The 100-metre marker at Zwingenberg railway station is taken to be the standard. In the west, Zwingenberg abuts the Hessisches Ried, and thereby the Rhine rift.

In Zwingenberg's west, towards Rodau and in Rodau itself, cropraising and meadows prevail. Only a small patch of woodland belongs to the municipal area near the Niederwaldsee (lake). In Zwingenberg there still exist remnants of, and even new fruit farming (mainly apples). On the outlying hills of the Orbishöhe (heights) and towards Luciberg is found winegrowing. Moreover, almond trees grow in the region. A narrower line of woodland in the municipal area can still be found in the area of the Morgenruhe foundry and running by way of Blockhütte towards Comoder Weg. Remains of granite quarrying can also still be made out.

Under the windbreak afforded by the Melibokus, a microclimate holds sway, which can in places near the slope lead to less precipitation than is found, for example, on the plain.

=== Neighbouring communities ===
Zwingenberg lies between the community of Alsbach-Hähnlein in Darmstadt-Dieburg in the north and the town of Bensheim in Bergstraße district in the south. In the west Bensheim's outlying centres of Fehlheim and Langwaden border on the outlying centre of Rodau. In the east Zwingenberg borders on the Melibokus, whose peak lies in the area of Auerbach, an outlying centre of Bensheim.

=== Constituent communities ===
Zwingenberg is made up of the two centres of Zwingenberg with an area of 346 hectares, and Rodau with an area of 215 hectares.

== Population development ==
As of 31 December 1971, the population figures include Rodau.

Year	1500	1622	1801	1861	1885	1900	1920	1946		
Inhabitants	450	600	1,052	1,531	1,515	1,638	2,100	3,148		
Year	1979	1980	1990	1995	2000	2004	2005	2006	2007	2013
Inhabitants	5,030	5,150	6,076	6,493	6,777	6,972	6,963	6,877	6,814	6,705

== History ==
“About when or by whom this town was built there is no information. That it is an ancient town can be gathered from all facts.” The earliest mention of locum getwinc is a document from 1015 in which Emperor Heinrich II donated hunting rights to the Lorsch Abbey. The placename Zwingenberg refers to how travellers on the Bergstraße were forced (in German gezwungen; infinitive zwingen) to pass through the town's gates by the wetland and lowland forest that lay west of town.

Through his marriage to Hildegard von Henneberg, Henry II of Katzenelnbogen, whom King Konrad III raised to Count in 1138, had parts of the Bergstraße pass to him about 1135. Zwingenberg now belonged to the County of Katzenelnbogen with its seat at the like-named town. The county was divided into upper and lower halves, with the former lying on the Rhine around Sankt Goar and the latter in southern Hessen.

To guard his southern holdings on the Bergstraße and his toll income, Count Diether IV built a lower castle in Zwingenberg and a high castle, the Auerbacher Schloss, above Auerbach.

In 1258, Diether V received the right to build a church in Zwingenberg:

Cathedral Provost Werner, Cathedral Deacon Johann and the Chapter at Mainz as well as Provost Ludwig of St. Viktor thereat evince that the inhabitants of Zwingenberg can only reach their mother church in Bensheim to hear God's word and receive the Sacraments with difficulty owing to the great distance and danger to life. They allow therefore with the Archbishop's approval at the request of the worldly lord in Zwingenberg, Count Diether of Katzenelnbogen, a church with graveyard to be built in Zwingenberg and a priest of its own to be appointed.

In 1260, the county was partitioned between Diether V and his brother Eberhard I, with Diether taking Zwingenberg and Eberhard Auerbach.

Zwingenberg was granted town and market rights under Count Diether V and King Rudolf of Habsburg, thereby becoming the oldest town on the Bergstraße.

In 1301, Zwingenberg was destroyed and went up in flames. Count Wilhelm I of Katzenelnbogen, Diether V's son, had allied himself with four Rhenish electors and raised tolls on the Rhine, the upshot to which was damage to free trade and a declaration of war from King Albrecht I. The Lower Castle was destroyed, too.

In 1330, Emperor Louis the Bavarian confirmed to Count Wilhelm I Zwingenberg's town rights:

Emperor Louis confirms to the Count Wilhelm of Katzenelnbogen for faithful services the freedom that King Rudolf granted him for Zwingenberg, and the freedom that he granted him for Reichenberg, as well as the Rhine upstream toll at Sankt Goar that Count Wilhelm and his forefathers have held in fief from the Empire. Whoever undertakes anything against it shall pay with 100 Marks of gold, half of which shall fall to the Chamber of the Empire and half to the Count.

In 1355, Wilhelm II took wedding vows with Elisabeth of Hanau. This involved providing for her in her widowhood with, among other things, a widow's seat for her in Darmstadt.

In 1401, the town's name was catalogued as Twinginburg.

In 1403, Count Johann IV Katzenelnbogen an Henne Weißkreis von Lindenfels pledged the castle and town of Zwingenberg with the villages of Eschollbrücken – which the Count owned – Pfungstadt and Nieder-Ramstadt with all rights and appurtenances for 6,000 Gulden, which the Count later redeemed.

In 1454, Count Philipp I of Katzenlenbogen agreed that Hans IV of Wallbrunn (whose seat was Wallbrunn) should provide a widowhood estate for his wife Lucie von Reifenberg consisting of, among other things, the house and a number of gardens at Zwingenberg, which Hans held from the Count as a fief, although without the military service obligation.

Until 1479, Zwingenberg belonged to the County of Katzenelnbogen, thereafter to the Landgraviate of Hessen, and as of 1567 to the Landgraviate of Hessen-Darmstadt, which in 1806 was raised to the Grand Duchy of Hessen.

Owing to the abandonments during the Thirty Years' War and shortly thereafter the Plague, the town was for decades almost uninhabited, and eventually, a fire set by French troops in 1693 destroyed most of the houses. Only after the French Revolution did the town recover.

In 1832, Zwingenberg was grouped into the Bensheim district, and as of 1938 it belonged to Bergstraße district. In the time of National Socialism, Jews and the Nazis' political foes were driven out and deported. By chance, the synagogue was not destroyed. It is nowadays used as a house. There is a club that has made it its business to revive the synagogue. In 1941, a prisoner-of-war camp was set up at the youth hostel.

On 31 December 1971, Rodau was amalgamated with Zwingenberg.

== Politics ==
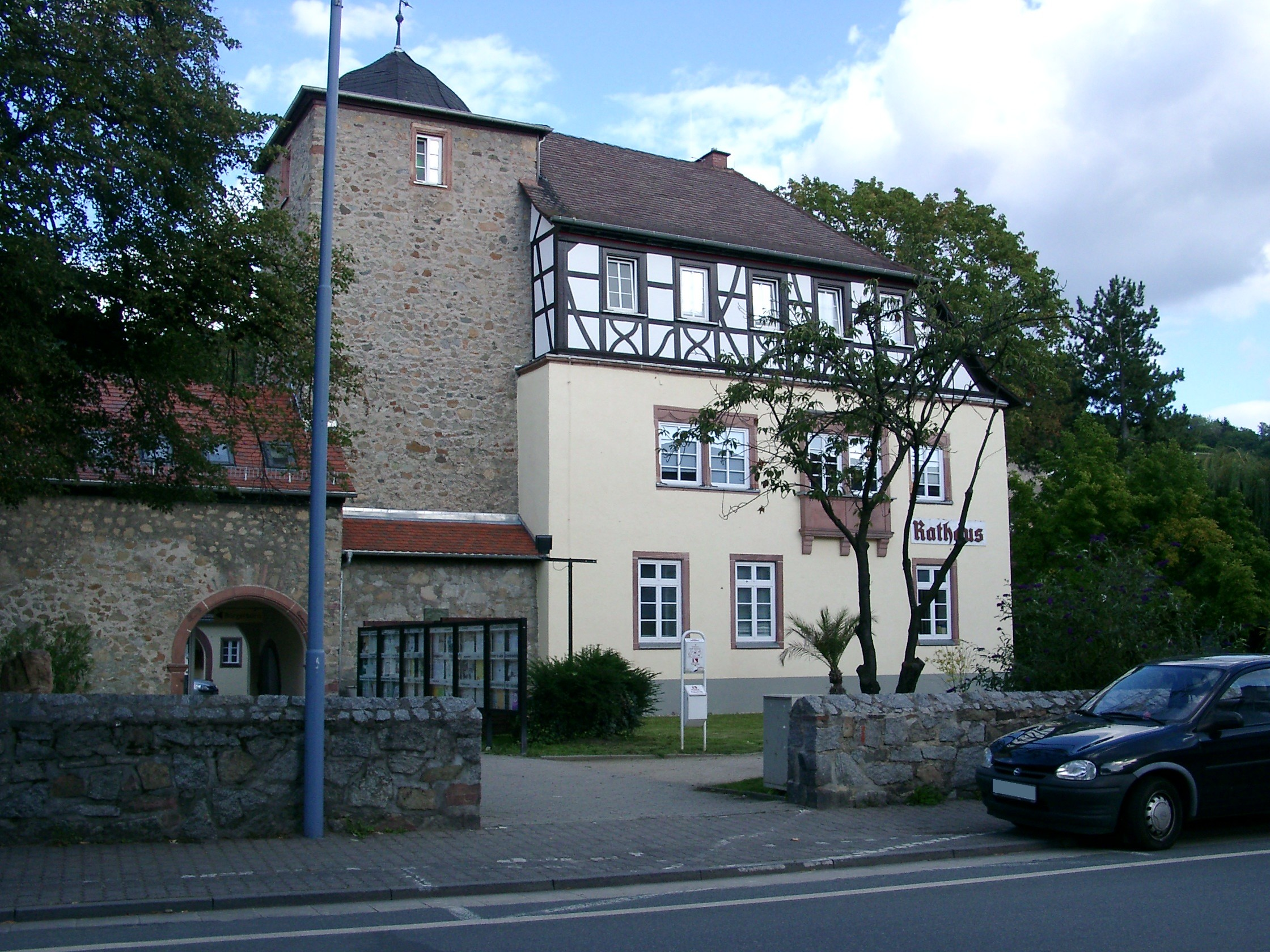
Zwingenberg's town hall

=== Town council ===
The composition of the town council after the four latest municipal elections:

Parties and voter communities		Seats; 2021	Seats; 2016	Seats; 2011	Seats; 2006
CDU	Christian Democratic Union of Germany	11	12	12	10
SPD	Social Democratic Party of Germany	5	6	8	9
GUD	Gemeinschaft für Umweltschutz und Demokratie	9	7	8	6
FDP	Free Democratic Party	6	6	3	5
FWZ	Freie Wähler Zwingenberg	-	-	–	1
Total		31	31	31	31
Turnout in %		57.9	56.4	59.1	54.1

=== Mayors ===
From 2001 to 2007, Dieter Kullak (independent) held office. At the election on 25 March 2007, in which Kullak was not a candidate, Holger Habich (FDP, but also supported by the CDU) was victorious. He was re-elected in 2013 and 2019.

On 23 February 2025, Sebastian Clever (CDU) won with 54.9% and a voter turnout of 83.4% against the independent candidate Stefan Juchems, who is a member of the Green Party. The new mayor's term of office began on 1 April 2025.

=== Coat of arms ===
The town's arms might be described thus: Party per fess Or a lion rampant gules armed and langued azure and azure three waterlily leaves argent.

The red lion rampant is from the arms borne by the old Counts of Katzenelnbogen. This same charge can also be seen in Darmstadt’s, Pfungstadt’s and Auerbach’s arms, and they are all parted per pale (that is, horizontally across the middle), just as Zwingenberg’s arms are.

=== Town partnerships ===
- Pierrefonds, Oise, France since 1968
- Brisighella, Emilia-Romagna, Italy
- Tetbury, Gloucestershire, England, United Kingdom since 1981
- (Germany) Eckartsberga, Saxony-Anhalt

== Economy and infrastructure ==
Although the economy was formerly largely based on agriculture and winegrowing, as well as gastronomy, since then, besides a great number of commercial enterprises, a series of smaller and midsize technology businesses has arisen.

=== Established businesses ===
- BRAIN Biotechnology Research and Information Network GmbH (biotechnological and genetic-technological research)
- Preussag Wasser und Rohrtechnik GmbH (water and pipe technology – environmental technology branch)
- PWT Wasser- und Abwassertechnik GmbH (water and sewage)
- Resin Express GmbH (plastic granulate distribution)
- SurTec Deutschland GmbH (chemical products and processes for surfacing technology)

=== Transport ===
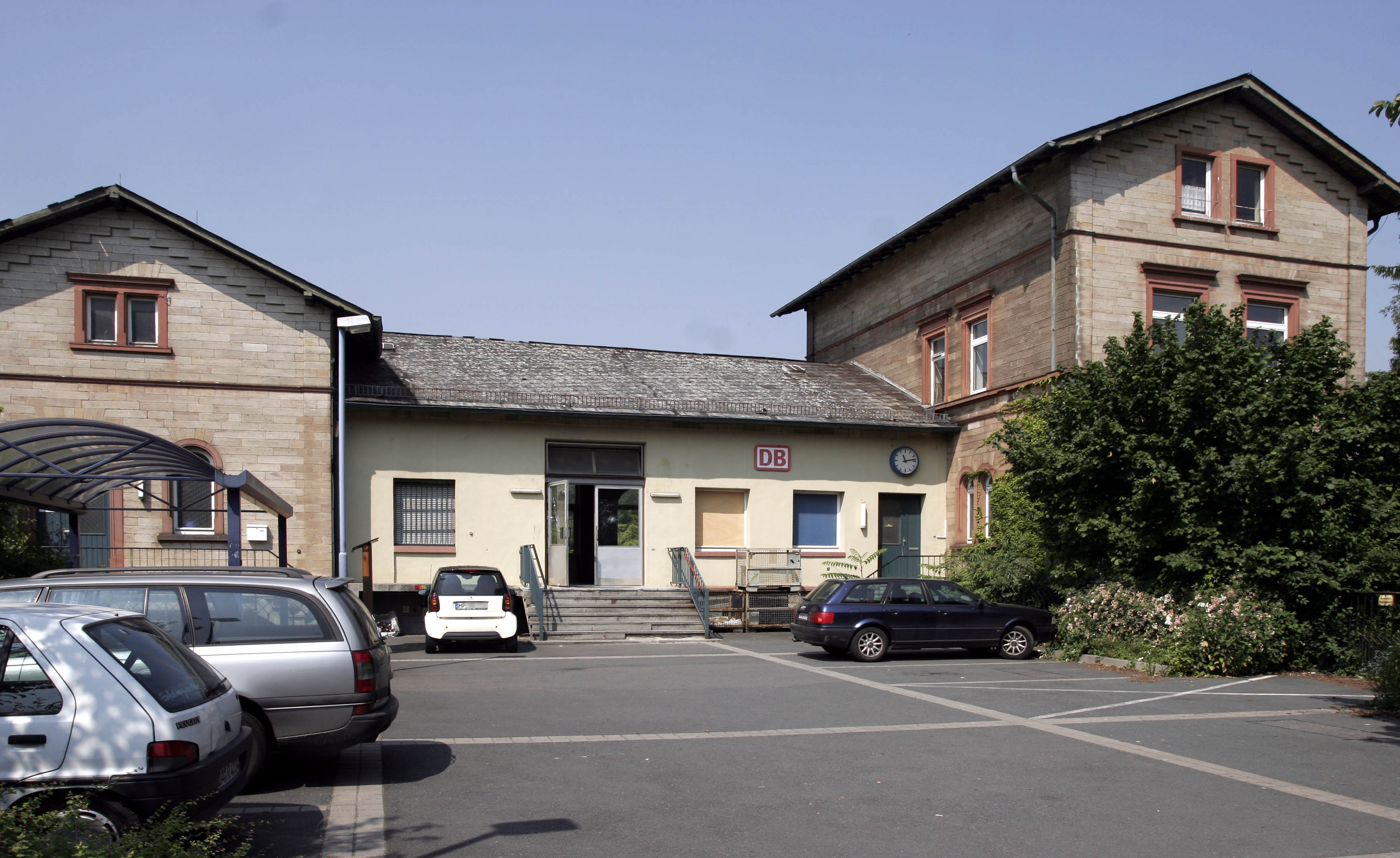
Zwingenberg railway station

Zwingenberg is linked to the A 5 (Frankfurt-Basel) by interchange 29, and Zwingenberg is also signposted on the A 67 at the Gernsheim interchange (8). Frankfurt Airport is 45 km away, and the riverport at Gernsheim on the Rhine is 12 km away.

Parallel to the Odenwald runs the Bergstraße (federal highway B 3), which in Zwingenberg splits into the “New” and “Old” Bergstraße, which come back together again near Darmstadt-Eberstadt.

The relief road originally planned for the B 3, called the Berliner Ring, is open in parts. The road, running parallel to the B 3, comes from Bensheim and leads back to the B 3 in Zwingenberg. Original plans to relieve the (very low – about 2.95 m) railway bridge by building another bridge farther north failed in the face of protests from residents and the neighbouring community through whose municipal area parts of the road would have run.

One of Germany's most heavily travelled railways, the Main-Neckar Railway (Frankfurt-Darmstadt-Heidelberg/Mannheim), runs through Zwingenberg. Zwingenberg station is served hourly by Regionalbahn trains. These are reinforced by other trains in rush hours.

Modern bus links of busline 669 run by Darmstadt's HEAG mobilo link the town with Jugenheim and Heppenheim.

=== Leisure and sport facilities ===
Zwingenberg has at its disposal a small sporting ground with grass and a complete athletics facility, a paved ground and a field. Moreover, there are several tennis courts and two sport halls. Rodau likewise has a grass playing field.

For 2015, there are plans to build a modern sport park in which all locally played sports will be represented.

== Culture and sightseeing ==
Zwingenberg lies on the edge of the Odenwald on the heights of the Melibokus on a relatively steep slope. The surrounding town wall is to a great extent still visible.

The Obergasse (“Upper Lane”) is the old getwinc, the thoroughfare that led through the town's lower and upper gates. The street's alignment was only slightly changed after the fire of 1693 and still more or less shows the position of the old Bergstraße.

The “New Pass” was until the 15th century still wetland. Today the B 3 runs here along the historic town wall through town. Between Schlößchen and Neugasse the remains of the town wall form the back walls of the houses and barns on Untergasse (“Lower Lane”)

Including the outlying centre of Rodau, Zwingenberg has 81 cultural monuments under monumental protection.

=== Buildings ===
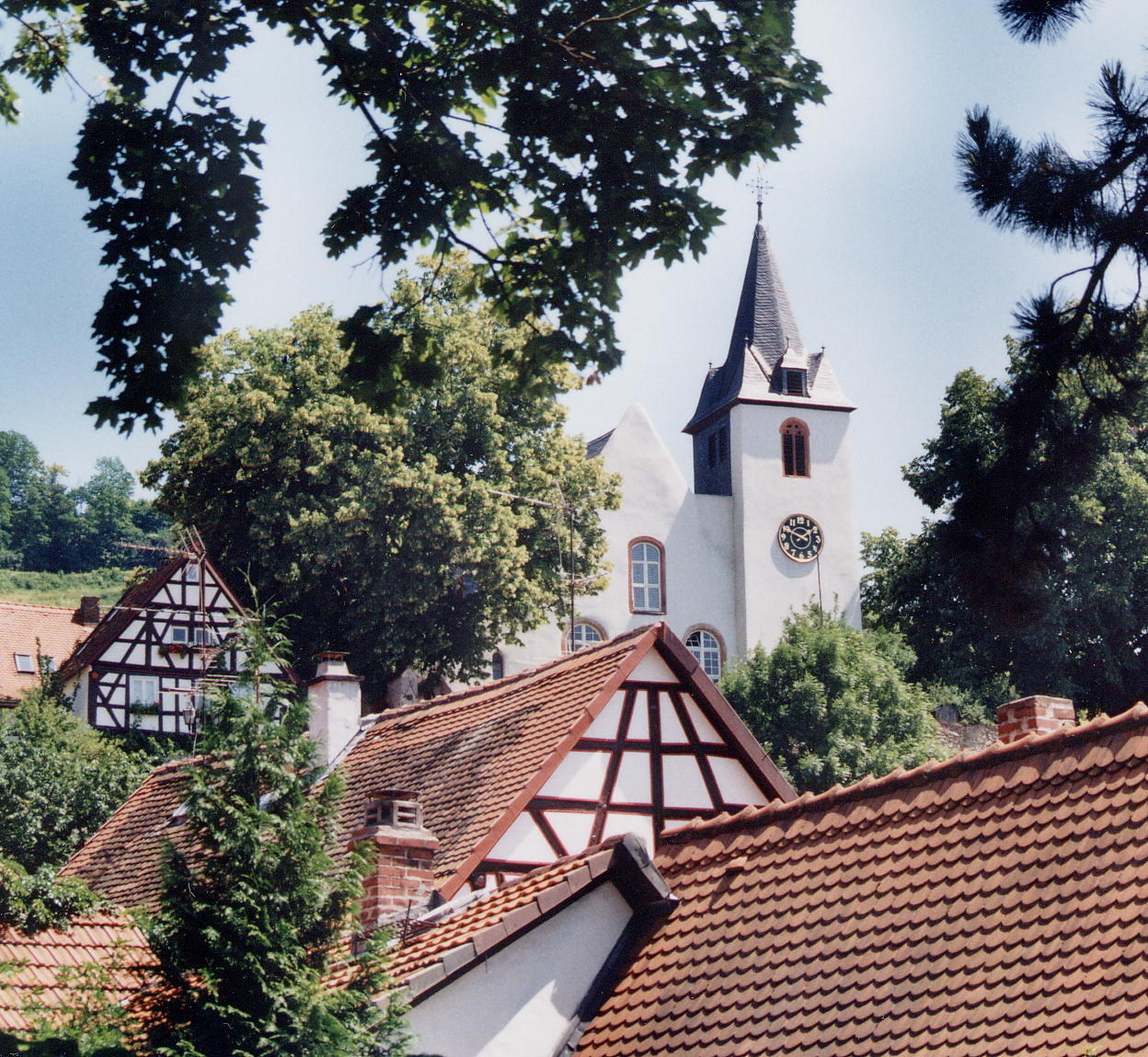
Bergkirche

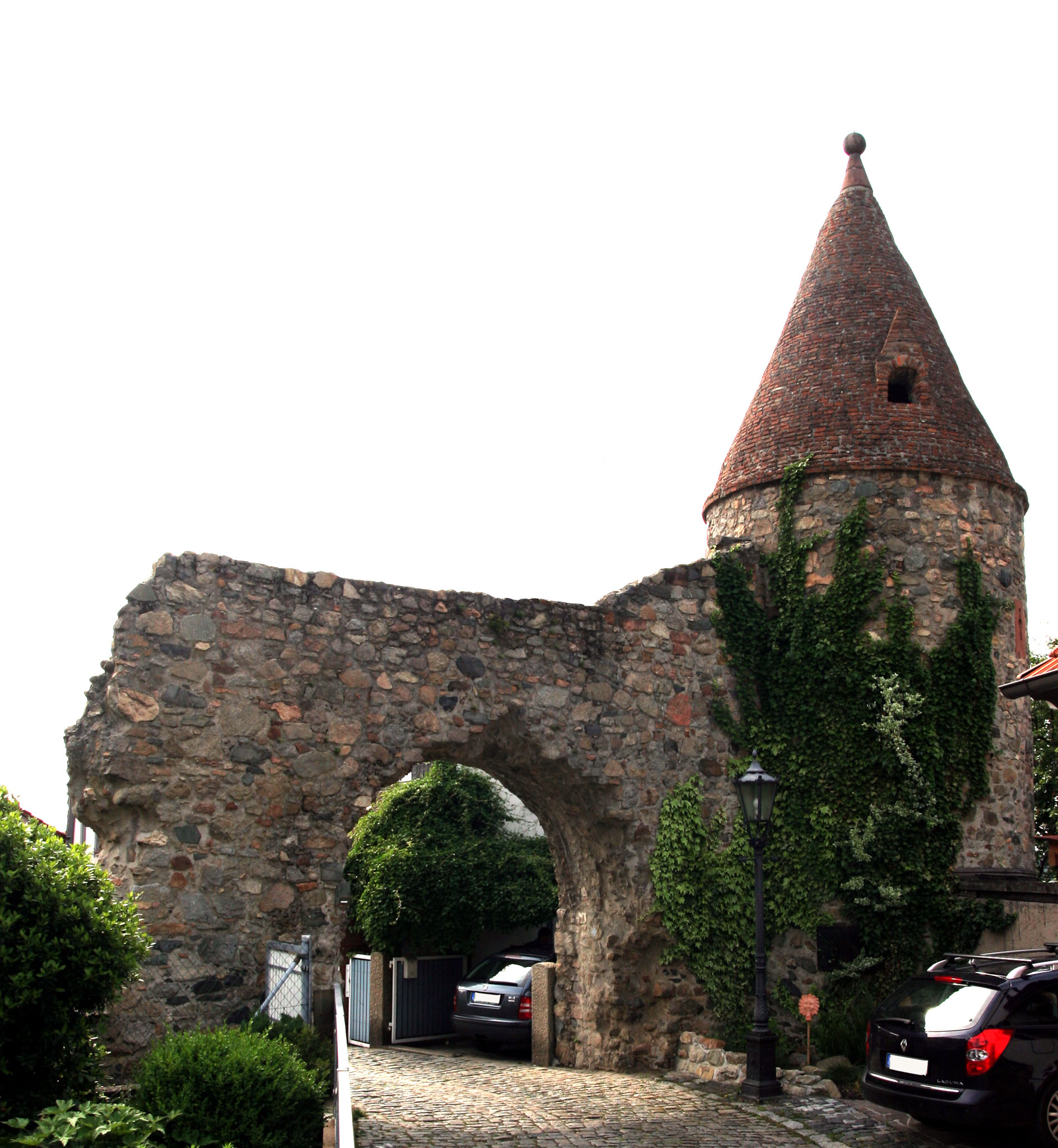
The Aul

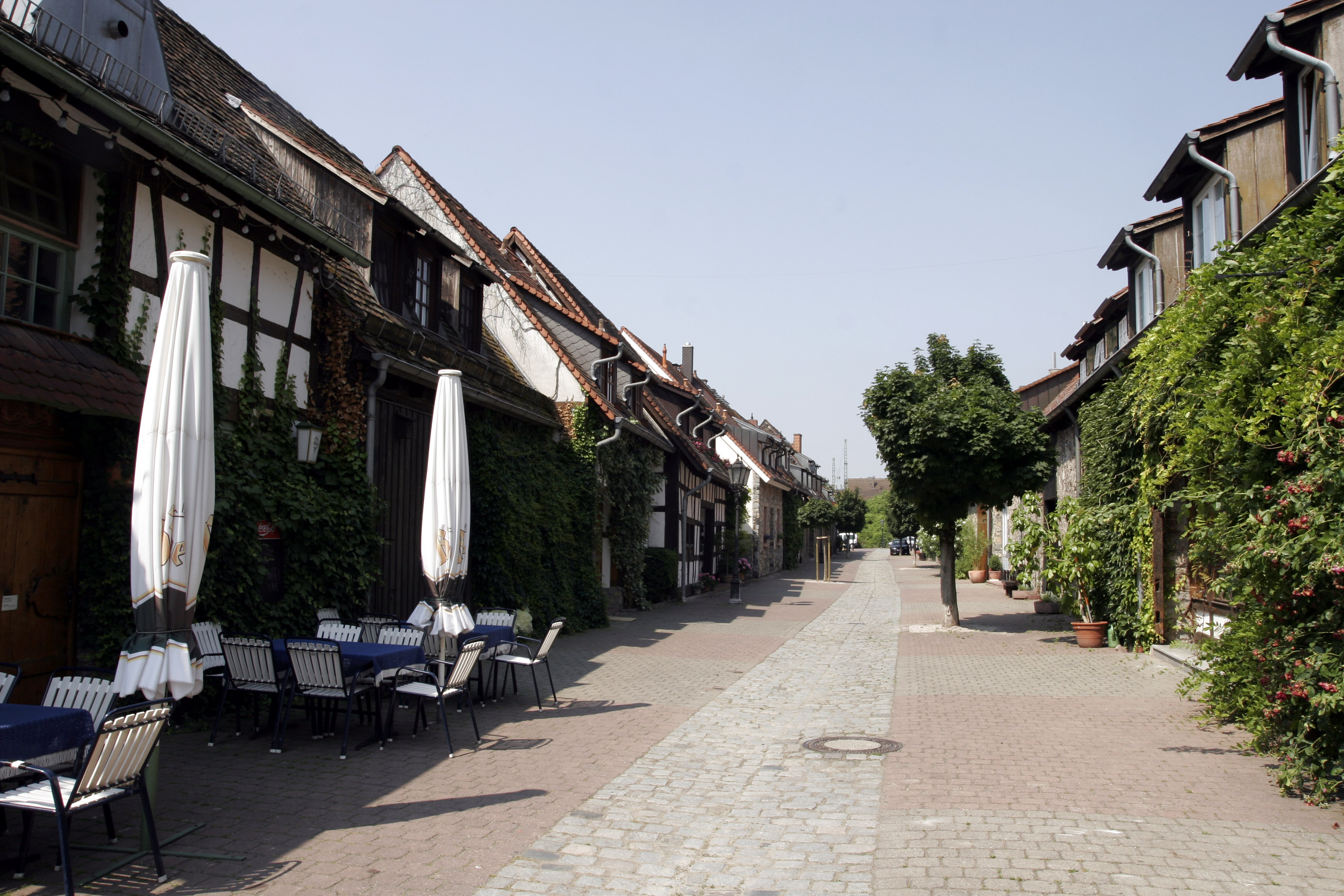
Timber-frame houses on Scheuergasse

The town has a touristically attractive Old Town with timber-frame houses that are interesting both as buildings and as the history that they represent, a mountain church (Bergkirche) and a former castle seat, enfeoffed by Johann von Katzenelnbogen to Hans von Wallbrunn the Elder in 1420.

At Zwingenberg's highest spot stands today's youth hostel, a former tithe barn built on a bastion’s foundation. Of the round corner towers of the upper town wall, only the Aul has been preserved. It is the northeast tower, a two-floor tower made of undressed quarrystones.

The remains of the moated castle may well be Zwingenberg’s oldest building. Outwards from this about 1250, the town fortifications took shape. The “New Marketplace” arose at the beginning of the 17th century on the former moated castle's lands and the moat itself.

The old Amtsgericht (“Amt court”) was built between 1561 and 1563 and restored in 1989. It originally served the Hessian landgraves as a hunting palace.

The Schlößchen (“Little Palace”), built about 1520, has served the town since 1969 as the Town Hall. Next to it stands the former guesthouse Zum Löwen (“To the Lion”). It was built in 1595 and is the oldest building in existence outside the old town wall. Across the street from it lies the Scheuergasse (lane) formed by two rows of side-gabled barns. These were built outside the old town wall owing to the danger from fire, and today are used mainly as dwellings, offices and guesthouses.

The vaulted cellar under the Alte Apotheke (“Old Apothecary’s Shop”), which stands on the marketplace, seems to go back to the time when the town wall was built. Later, the Alte Apotheke was known as großherzogliche Apotheke von Katzenellenbogen (the first word meaning “Grand-Ducal”), and was built in 1783.

=== Wine and culinary specialities ===
Zwingenberg is part of the small winegrowing region of Hessische Bergstraße which is known for herb wines. On the slopes of the Melibokus lie, within the Auerbacher Rott growing region, the locations of Zwingenberger Steingeröll and Zwingenberger Alte Burg. Abutting them to the north is the location of Alsbacher Schöntal. White grape varieties grown here include Sylvaner, Riesling, Müller-Thurgau and Morio Muscat. Asparagus and strawberry farming characterize the flatter areas towards Rodau. Typical for Zwingenberg, therefore, are a robust dry Riesling and mellow asparagus dishes.

=== Theatre ===
In the vaulted cellar under the former Amtsgericht is found the Theater Mobile, which puts on its own and others’ productions mainly in the fields of music, reading, children's theatre, dance and cabaret.

=== Museums ===
The Heimatmuseum (local history) on historic Scheuergasse shows old handicrafts and historically decorated rooms.

In June 2005, the information centre Blüten, Stein & Wein (“Blossoms, Stone and Wine”) of the UNESCO Geopark Bergstraße-Odenwald opened at the community centre Bunter Löwe (“Colourful Lion”). The information centre, which is open at weekends and after notification, also houses the tourist information centre.

== Famous people ==
=== Honorary citizens ===
The town's first honorary citizen was the Reverend Adam Höfle (1900–1999).

=== Sons and daughters of the town ===
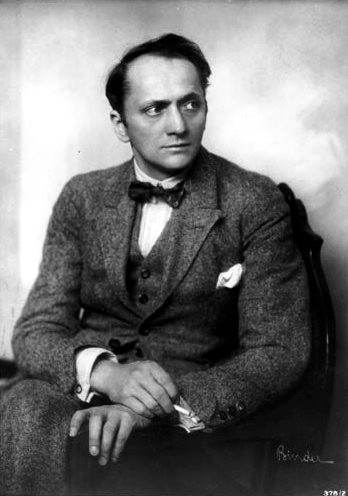
Theodor Loos around 1920

- Theodor Loos (1883–1954), actor

=== Famous people with ties to the town ===
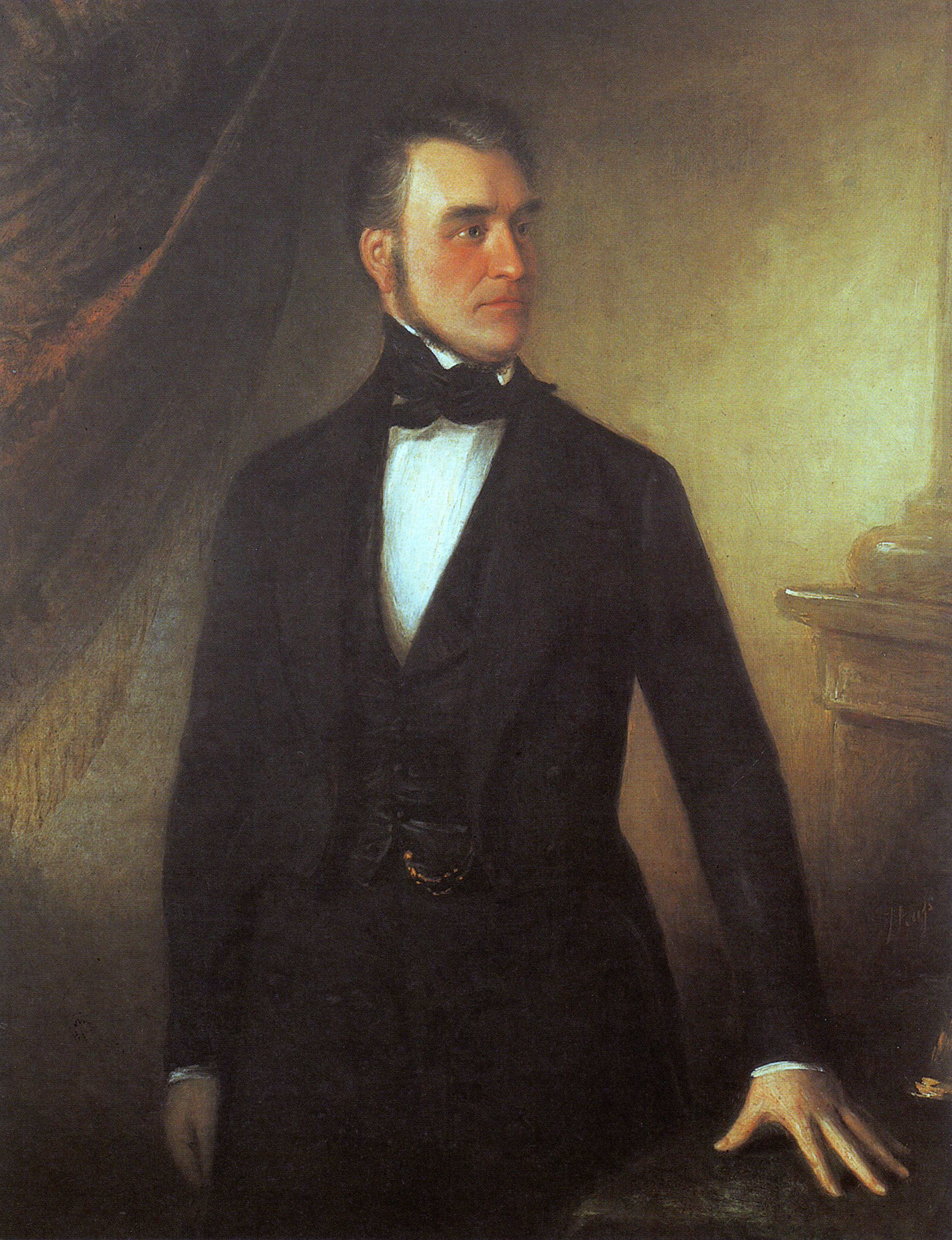
Heinrich von Gagern 1848

- Heinrich von Gagern (1799–1880) politician, in the preliminary convention (Vorparlament) of Frankfurt for the electoral district of Zwingenberg.
- Henry Kissinger, (born 1923), who acted as an agent in the U.S. Army Counter Intelligence Corps in Bensheim, lived for a few months at the Arthur-Sauer-Villa in Zwingenberg, which was requisitioned for him.
- Arthur Sauer (1887-1946), (chemist), joined the Deutsche Milchwerke pharmaceutical plant founded by Worms apothecary Rudolf Pizzala in 1897, and took the business over in 1898. Out of this grew the later Fissan-Werke (1924). By 1934, the firm already had 160 workers and employees, as well as 50 others employed in sales. His vehicle is today on display at the Technikmuseum Speyer
