= Melibokus =

Hill in Hesse, Germany

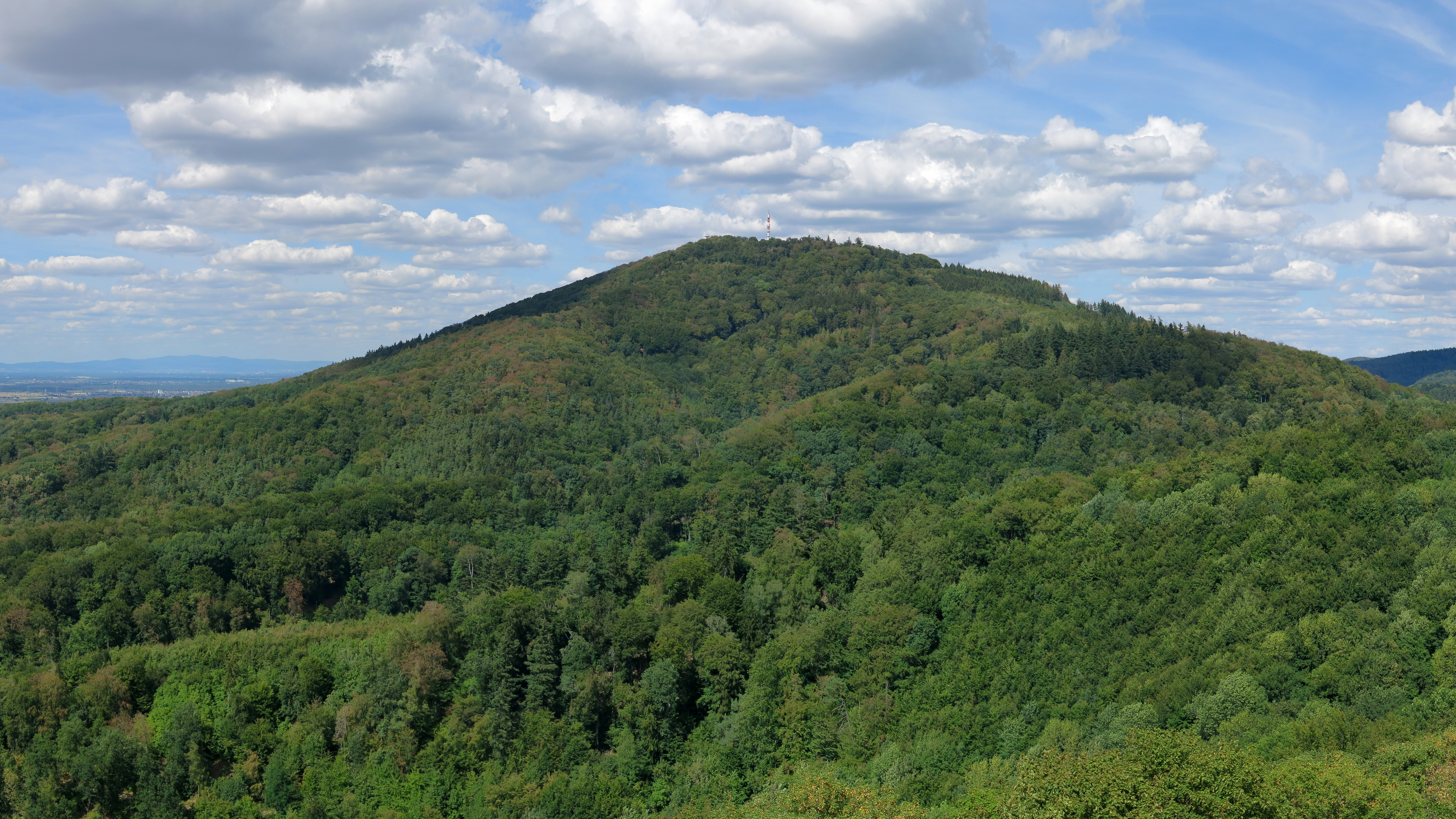
- Melibokus

Highest point
- Elevation: 517 m (1,696 ft)
- Coordinates: 49°43′30.75″N 8°38′12.54″E

Geography
- Location within Hesse
- Location: Hesse, Germany
- Parent range: Odenwald

The Melibokus (also Melibocus, Malchen or Malschen) is at 517 metres (1696 feet), the highest hill in the Bergstraße region of southern Hesse, central Germany. It was also the name of a mountain range in Germania, described by classical sources. But the two are probably not the same.

Melibokus overlooks the Rhine valley on the western fringe of the Odenwald region and is a local landmark, clearly visible for many miles. On the summit there is a small cafe, a public lookout tower and a US Army radio mast erected on the site of a previous stone tower, destroyed during World War II. The hill is accessible from Zwingenberg/Bergstrasse by foot. The "Nibelungensteig" hill trail leads you from the railway station in Zwingenberg towards the east.

== Medieval name ==
The medieval place name of the modern Melibokus was Mons Malscus, and there is a settlement in the region, Malchen. One possible etymology derives the name from Old High German malsc, "conceited", which Julius Pokorny reports is from Indo-European mel- "grind" in the sense of "ground down" or "weak".

== Classical Melibokus ==
Despite the modern use of the classical name, the mountain mentioned in classical sources was not the same mountain range. According to Ptolemy's account, a tribe using this name lived near the river Elbe, east of the Melibokus mountains, which were not the modern Melibokus, but a mountain range which Ptolemy described impossibly as both the origin of the Weser, and a mountain range through which the Elbe flowed. In older scholarship the Melibokus was identified with the Harz mountains, or Thuringian Forest or both, but it was apparently also intended to include the Ore mountains and Lusatian mountains at the north of the modern Czech Republic, on its border with modern Germany.
