= Rödermark-Ober Roden station =

Railway station in Rödermark, Germany

Rödermark-Ober Roden
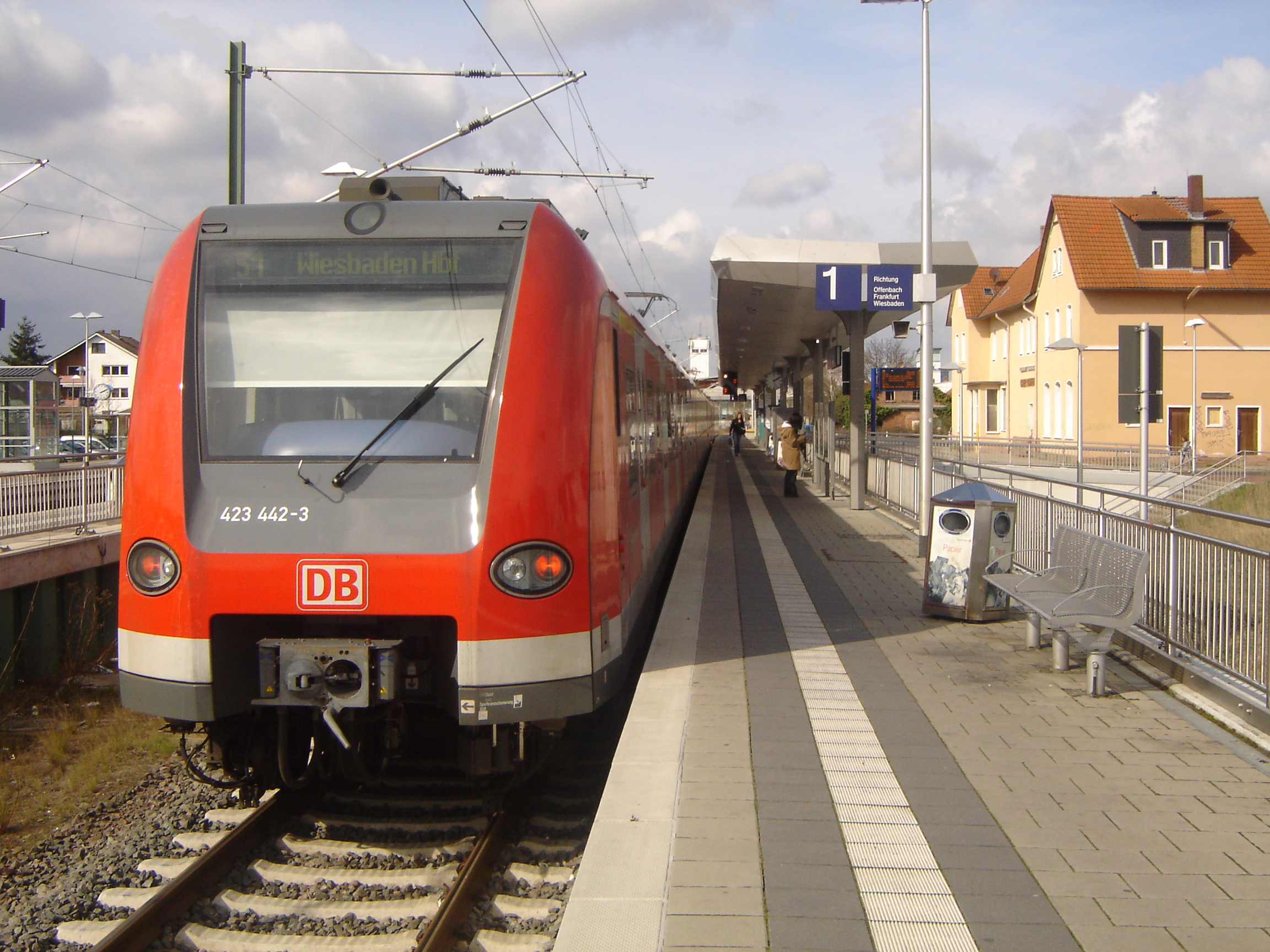
- S-Bahn set of class 423 in Rödermark-Ober Roden station

General information
- Location: Dieburgerstr. 69, Ober-Roden, Rödermark, Hesse; Germany
- Coordinates: 49°58′24″N 8°49′44″E
- Owner: DB Netz
- Operator: DB Station&Service
- Lines: Rodgau Railway (km 21.9) (S-Bahn); Dreieich Railway (km 0.0)
- Platforms: 4

Construction
- Accessible: Yes

Other information
- Station code: 4615
- DS100 code: FORD
- IBNR: 8000285
- Category: 4
- Fare zone: : 3565
- Website: www.bahnhof.de

History
- Opened: 1896

Services
Preceding station	DB Regio Mitte	Following station
Rödermark-Urberach towards Frankfurt (Main) Hbf	RB 61	Eppertshausen towards Dieburg
Preceding station	Rhine-Main S-Bahn	Following station
Rodgau-Rollwald towards Wiesbaden Hbf	S1 (Rhine-Main S-Bahn)	Terminus
Location
- Location within Hesse

Rödermark-Ober Roden station (German: Bahnhof Rödermark-Ober Roden) is the station of the Rödermark suburb of Ober-Roden in the German state of Hesse. It is the southern terminus of line S1 of the Rhine-Main S-Bahn and a stop for RB 61 Regionalbahn services on the Dreieich Railway. It is classified in station category 4 and is a hub for public transport. The station building is a listed building.

== History ==
Ober-Roden was connected to the railway network in 1896 with the opening of the Rodgau Railway (Rodgaubahn), which connected Offenbach (Main) Hauptbahnhof via Ober-Roden to Dieburg on the Rhine-Main Railway. The first part of the present entrance building was built during its construction. The Dreieich Railway (Dreieichbahn) was opened in 1905, running from Buchschlag on the Main-Neckar Railway via Urberach.

The modernisation of the Dreieich Railway began in 1997. Platform and tracks were rebuilt and preparations were made for the construction of a platform subway.

The station was completely rebuilt for the upgrade of the Rodgau Railway in preparation for the extension of the S-Bahn in 2003. The platform access previously provided by a pedestrian bridge was replaced by a barrier-free subway. Since then there has been direct access on the main platform between the S-Bahn and the buses. The platforms for tracks 2-4 are connected by stairs and lifts to the subway.

The conversion of the station forecourt to a substantial urban gateway began in the third quarter of 2013. The station building was renovated during this work. Various residential and shopping areas were incorporated in the building. A glass structure was planned on the site of the former northern building, which would house a catering business.

== Current services ==
Ober-Roden stations is located in the fare zone of the Rhein-Main-Verkehrsverbund (RMV), which manages S-Bahn and Regionalbahn services as well as bus and night bus services.

=== Rail services ===
From Mondays to Fridays the station is served by 173 trains daily:

- S-Bahn line S1 runs from here via Offenbach am Main and Frankfurt Hauptbahnhof to Wiesbaden Hauptbahnhof; in the peak it runs every 15 minutes, but the additional services run only as far as Hochheim.
- The services on the Dreieich Railway run hourly between Ober-Roden and Dieburg or Frankfurt (Main) Hauptbahnhof and half hourly between Ober-Roden and Dreieich-Buchschlag. In the peak hour, additional trains that run to Frankfurt Hbf combine to create a service every 15 minutes between Ober-Roden and Dreieich-Buchschlag.

=== Bus services ===
S-Bahn	S1 (Rhine-Main S-Bahn)
Regionalbahn	RB 61
Bus routes	OF-95 674 679 X74
Night bus routes	n65 n66 679

The change from the bus to the S-Bahn requires a very short walk. The platform that adjoins track 1, which is used by S-Bahn services, serves on its other side as a bus platform. The barrier-free transfer path is only about five metres.

- Various bus routes stop on the eastern side of the station and connect Ober-Roden with the surrounding area:

route OF-95: Neu-Isenburg – Dietzenbach – Ober-Roden – Urberach
route 674: Ober-Roden – Dieburg – Darmstadt
route 679: Ober-Roden – Dieburg – Groß-Zimmern – Reinheim (on Fri/Sat and Sat/Sun nights there is also a Nightliner on the Dieburg–Ober-Roden section)
Linie X74: Ober-Roden – Eppertshausen – Münster – Darmstadt (express bus)

This adds up to about 100 bus connections per day.

=== Night services ===
Rödermark-Ober Roden station is served by several night lines.

- Weekends and nights before holidays:

S-Bahn line S1: Wiesbaden Hbf – Frankfurt Hbf – Frankfurt Süd – Offenbach Hbf – Rodgau – Ober-Roden
Line n66: (Frankfurt Konstablerwache –) Offenbach-Marktplatz – Heusenstamm – Dietzenbach – Ober-Roden

Line n66 runs as line n65 without change from Frankfurt-Konstablerwache.

Linie 679 (Nightliner): (Darmstadt Hbf –) Dieburg – Münster – Eppertshausen – Ober-Roden

The Nightliner line 679 runs as line 672 without change from Darmstadt Hbf.

- On all other nights (normal nights from Monday to Friday):

Linie n65: Frankfurt Konstablerwache – Offenbach-Marktplatz – Rodgau – Ober-Roden

In Offenbach-Marktplatz there is a connection to S-Bahn line S8 to Frankfurt.
