= Rhine-Main Railway =

Railway line in southern Germany

Overview
- Native name: Rhein-Main-Bahn
- Line number: 3520 Mainz–Mainz-Bischofsheim; 3530 Mainz-Bischofsheim–Darmstadt; 3540 Weiterstadt Stockschneise–Darmstadt Nord; 3557 Darmstadt–Aschaffenburg
- Locale: Bavaria and Hesse, Germany

Service
- Route number: 651

Technical
- Line length: 77.7 km (48.3 mi)
- Number of tracks: 2 (throughout)
- Electrification: 15 kV/16.7 Hz AC overhead catenary
- Operating speed: 160 km/h (99 mph) (max)

The Rhine-Main Railway (German: Main-Rhein-Bahn), is a railway line in southern Germany from Mainz via Darmstadt to Aschaffenburg. It was built by the Hessian Ludwig Railway (Hessische Ludwigsbahn) and opened on 1 August 1858 and is one of the oldest railways in Germany. Until 1862, when the railway bridge over the Rhine river constructed and assembled by MAN-Werk Gustavsburg was finished, a train ferry operated on the river.

== Route ==
In Mainz the line crosses the Rhine at its confluence with the Main and continued to Bischofsheim, where the Main Railway branches off towards Frankfurt am Main, and turns to the southeast towards Gross-Gerau. It then proceeds in an easterly direction to Darmstadt and reaches the north end of the track field of Darmstadt Hauptbahnhof (central station). Passenger trains generally run on the Main-Neckar line to Darmstadt Hbf, before reversing to continue their journey on the Rhine-Main line. Nevertheless, the line’s tracks continue under the station's track field, allowing trains to run directly towards Aschaffenburg. This route is almost exclusively used by freight trains. East of Darmstadt the line runs through a contiguous forested area through Messel station to Dieburg, which is also served by trains on the Rodgau line and the Dreieich line to Dreieich-Buchschlag and Frankfurt am Main. The route then runs in a northeasterly direction via Babenhausen, crosses the Main between Stockstadt and Mainaschaff and ends in Aschaffenburg. The whole line is double track and electrified. The Rhine-Main line has the unusual distinction of being served by regional trains that operate through three German states: Rhineland-Palatinate, Hesse and Bavaria.

== History ==
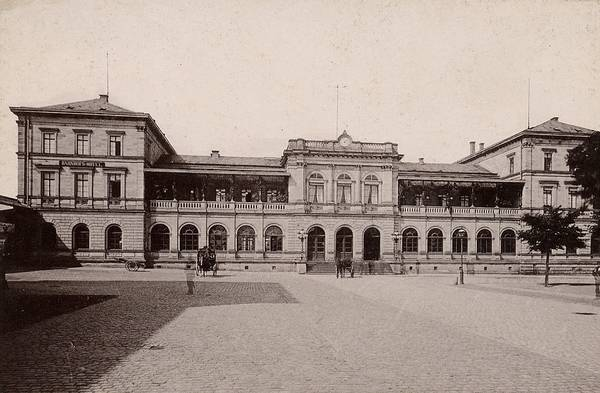
Old railway station of the Hessian Ludwig Railway in Darmstadt, ca. 1875

The Rhine-Main line was designed, built and operated by the private Hessian Ludwig Railway. It came to compete with the North Main route (the Frankfurt-Hanau and Taunus Railways) between the Rhine and the Bavarian Ludwig's Western Railway at Aschaffenburg. In contrast to this route, the Rhine-Main line offered an uninterrupted line, while the Taunus and Frankfurt-Hanau lines in the early days still terminated at two different train stations in Frankfurt, which were not linked by rail. The disadvantage of the Rhine-Main line was that at first the crossing of the Rhine to Mainz depended on a train ferry. Apart from the Rhine and Main there were no significant physical obstacles for the railway to overcome.

The basis for the construction of the line was a treaty between the Grand Duchy of Hesse and the Kingdom of Bavaria on 28 March 1852. The concession to build the line in Hesse-Darmstadt was granted on 3 March 1856 and construction began after the harvest of 1856. In February 1856, the section between Mainspitze ("Main spit" on the Rhine opposite Mainz) and Darmstadt was completed. On 19 April 1858 the Grand Duke Louis III visited the construction site at Mainspitze and used a train. Test runs were operated on the line from 18 July. The Rhine-Main line finally opened on 1 August 1858 between Mainspitze and Darmstadt. It was first released for freight trains and a little later for the first passenger trains. The eastern section to Aschaffenburg was opened on 15 November 1858, with scheduled passenger trains operating on 27 December 1858. At the beginning there were three trains each way, each day; a few years later there were eight. The construction of the railway infrastructure cost 3.9 million guilders. The duplication of the line began in 1871. It was praised by passengers for having glass windows in its third class carriages—in contrast to the adjacent Main-Neckar Railway.

The Hessian Ludwig Railway Company, including the Rhine-Main Railway, was nationalised during the formation of the Prussian-Hessian Railway Company (Königlich Preußische und Großherzoglich Hessischen Staatseisenbahnen) in 1897.

The line was electrified in 1958/59 and since 9 May 1960 electric trains have operated on it.

== Operations ==
=== Freight ===
The track is important for long distance freight transport as it bypasses the Frankfurt am Main rail node. It connects the Left and Right Rhine line with the Main-Spessart Railway and also to the north to Hanau and the Frankfurt–Bebra railway, the Friedberg-Hanau line and the Main-Weser Railway. The line is also used by Motorail trains and occasionally used for military and nuclear waste transport.

=== Passengers ===
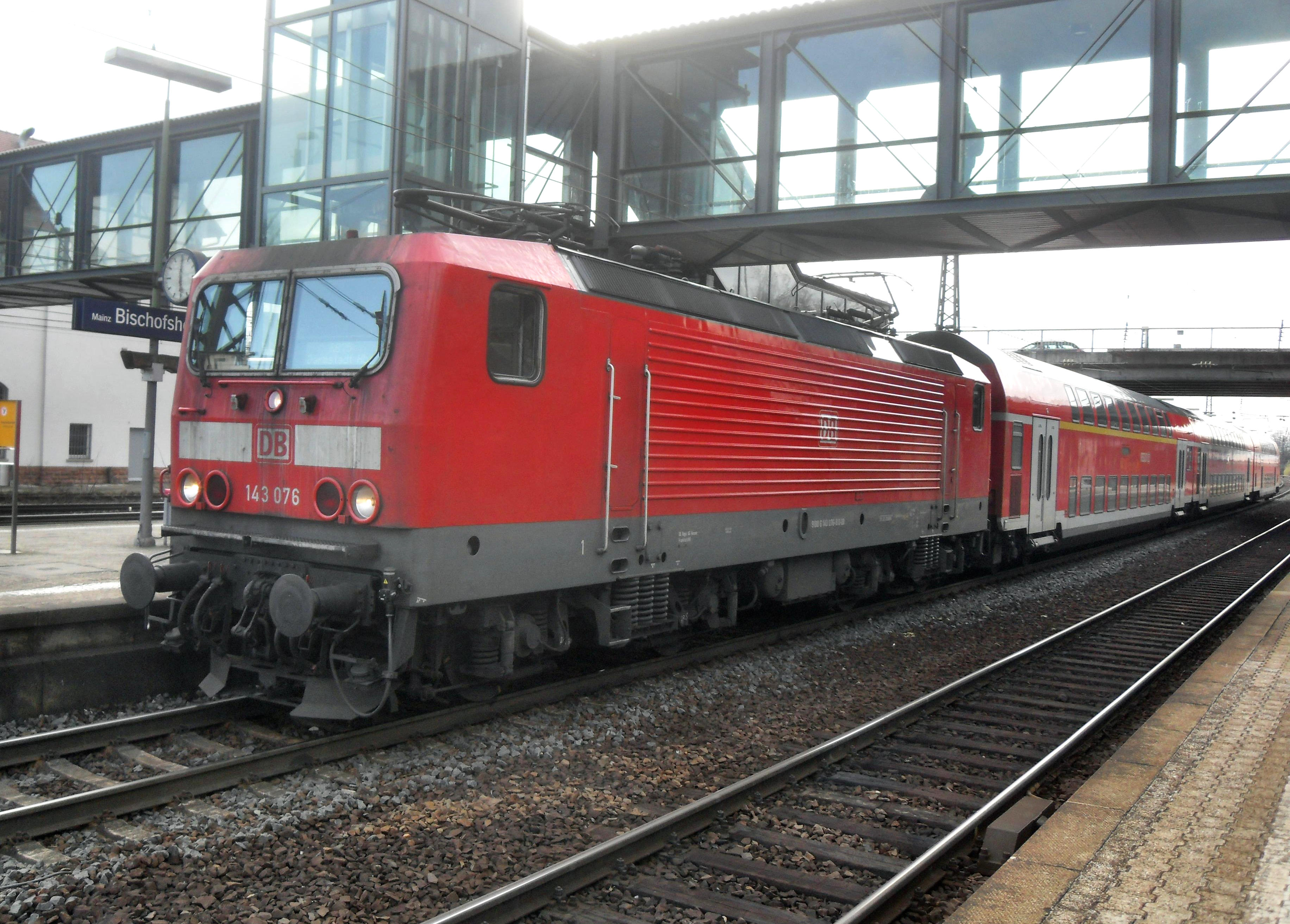
Regionalbahn train hauled by class 143 electric locomotive in Mainz-Bischofsheim station on its way to Darmstadt

The line is operated in passenger transport as route number 651 and is managed by the Rhine-Main Transport Association (Rhein-Main-Verkehrsverbund, RMV) and served by Regionalbahn line 75. A contract for the operation of the line was awarded for 10 years from December 2008 to DB Regio, which has gradually converted operations since the end of July 2008 from old Silberling sets to modern double-deckers. Trains also run via Mainz to Wiesbaden Hauptbahnhof. Services on the line run every hour; at peak hours from Monday to Friday, between 6 and 9 AM and between 4 and 7 PM services operate every half-hour, with only an hourly train operating via Darmstadt Hauptbahnhof.
