= Babenhausen station =

Railway station in Babenhausen, Germany

Babenhausen (Hess)
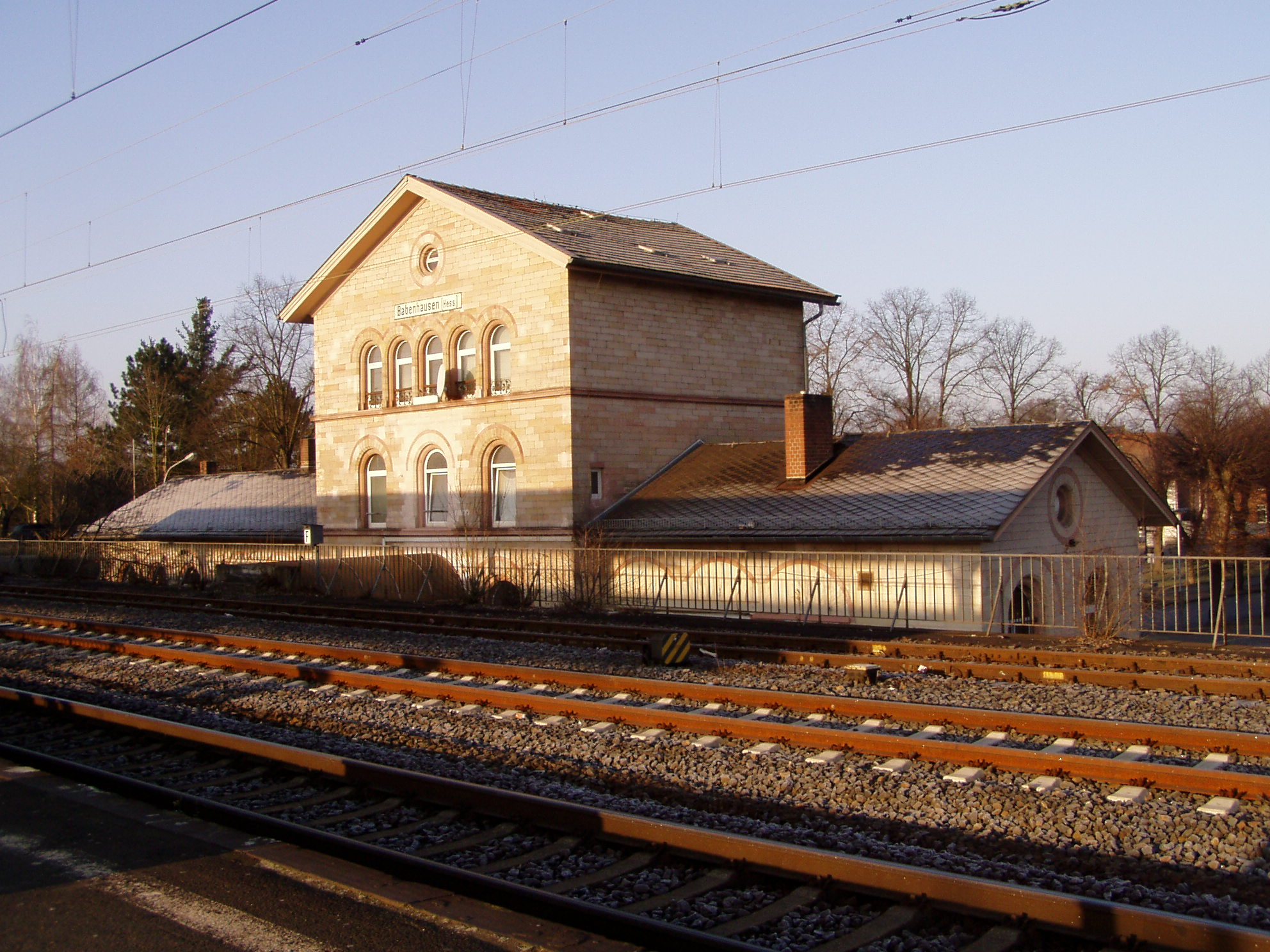

General information
- Location: Am Bahnhof 1, Babenhausen, Hesse; Germany
- Coordinates: 49°57′29″N 8°57′25″E
- Owner: Deutsche Bahn
- Operator: DB Netz; DB Station&Service
- Lines: Odenwald Railway (68.2 km) (KBS 641); Rhine-Main Railway (63.7 km) (KBS 651)
- Platforms: 4

Construction
- Accessible: Yes

Other information
- Station code: 238
- DS100 code: FBA
- IBNR: 8000015
- Category: 4
- Fare zone: : 4143
- Website: www.bahnhof.de

History
- Opened: 25 December 1858

Services
Preceding station	VIAS	Following station
Seligenstadt (Hess) towards Frankfurt (Main) Hbf	RE 85	Groß-Umstadt Mitte towards Groß-Umstadt-Wiebelsbach
Mainhausen Zellhausen towards Hanau Hbf	RB 86	Babenhausen Langstadt towards Groß-Umstadt-Wiebelsbach
Preceding station	Hessische Landesbahn	Following station
Hergershausen towards Wiesbaden Hbf	RB 75	Stockstadt (Main) towards Aschaffenburg Hbf
Location

Babenhausen (officially: Babenhausen (Hess)) station is a junction station at the intersection of the Rhine-Main Railway (German: Rhine-Main-Bahn) and the Odenwald Railway (German: Odenwaldbahn) in the town of Babenhausen in the German state of Hesse.

== History ==
The station was built for the Rhine-Main Railway and put into operation on 25 December 1858. In 1868, the first section of the Odenwald Railway was opened to Groß-Umstadt. In 1876, the three-storey station building was erected, which still stands today. It was built in light-coloured sandstone. In 1904, a small restaurant was opened. The station building is listed as a monument under the Hessian Heritage Act.

In the 1920s, work began on rebuilding the station to deal with increasing traffic. The tracks were raised 5 metres and the level crossings over Aschaffenburger and Darmstadter Straße were closed. An underpass was built immediately next to the station building for today’s federal highway B 26. This work was completed in 1928/1929. In 1944, the railways was damaged several times in air raids.

In 1960, the Rhine-Main Railway was electrified. In 1968, a signalling centre was opened to the south of the tracks. In 2003, the ticket office was closed and shortly afterwards the restaurant and kiosk were also closed. The station building was sold in 2004 and has changed hands several times since. In 2009, the former ticket office was converted into a kiosk and now magazines, drinks and snacks are available there.

== Infrastructure ==
Trains on the Rhine-Main Railway in normal service use the northern tracks in the station. The station is used to allow scheduled trains to pass on the normally single-track Odenwald Railway. The platform tracks are located on two islands located between the tracks and access to the platforms is only possible via an underpass. At the eastern end of the station the track of the Odenwald Railway to Hanau crosses the Rhine-Main Railway over a grade-separated crossing. For trains running to Dieburg there are additional passing loops, which are used for the overtaking of freight trains.

In the north-eastern part of the station there is a freight yard, which used to be a major yard. It formerly had considerable importance for U.S. Army units stationed there, but it is now only used to a limited extent, including for the loading of timber. The track that ran to the yard from the Hanau direction was closed in 2007.

== Services ==
=== Rail ===
The Rhine-Main Railway and the Odenwald Railway cross in Babenhausen. The following services stop here:

Line	Route	Frequency
RB 75	Wiesbaden Hbf – Mainz Hbf – Groß Gerau – Darmstadt Hbf – Dieburg – Babenhausen (Hess) – Aschaffenburg Hbf	Mon-Fri: twice an hour, Sat-Sun: hourly
RE 85	Frankfurt (Main) Hbf – Hanau Hbf – Babenhausen (Hess) – Groß-Umstadt Wiebelsbach (– Erbach (Odenw))	Hourly
RB 86	Hanau Hbf – Seligenstadt (Hess) – Babenhausen (Hess) – Groß-Umstadt Wiebelsbach	Hourly

In general, there are good interchanges between trains every hour.

=== Buses ===
Babenhausen is also a major hub of regional bus services:

- Linie K 53: Babenhausen – Schaafheim – Ringheim - Großostheim – Aschaffenburg
- Linie K 54: Babenhausen – Schaafheim – Radheim - Mosbach – Wenigumstadt – Pflaumheim – Großostheim – Aschaffenburg
- Linie K 65: Babenhausen – Hergershausen – Langstadt – Schaafheim
- Linie K 66: Babenhausen – VDO – Jürgen-Schumann-Straße
- Linie K 86: Babenhausen – Harreshausen – VDO – Rodgau-Dudenhofen (connection to Rhine-Main S-Bahn line S 2))
- Linie 677: Darmstadt – Dieburg – Altheim – Babenhausen – Stockstadt/Main – Aschaffenburg (late night only; replacement for RB 75 on the Rhine-Main Railway)

== Development plans ==
At the moment the station is in a neglected state. The station building is partly empty and the underpass is in need of renovation. An underpass under the B 26 and the construction of a park and ride facility is under discussion.
