= Regionaltangente West =

Railway project in Frankfurt am Main

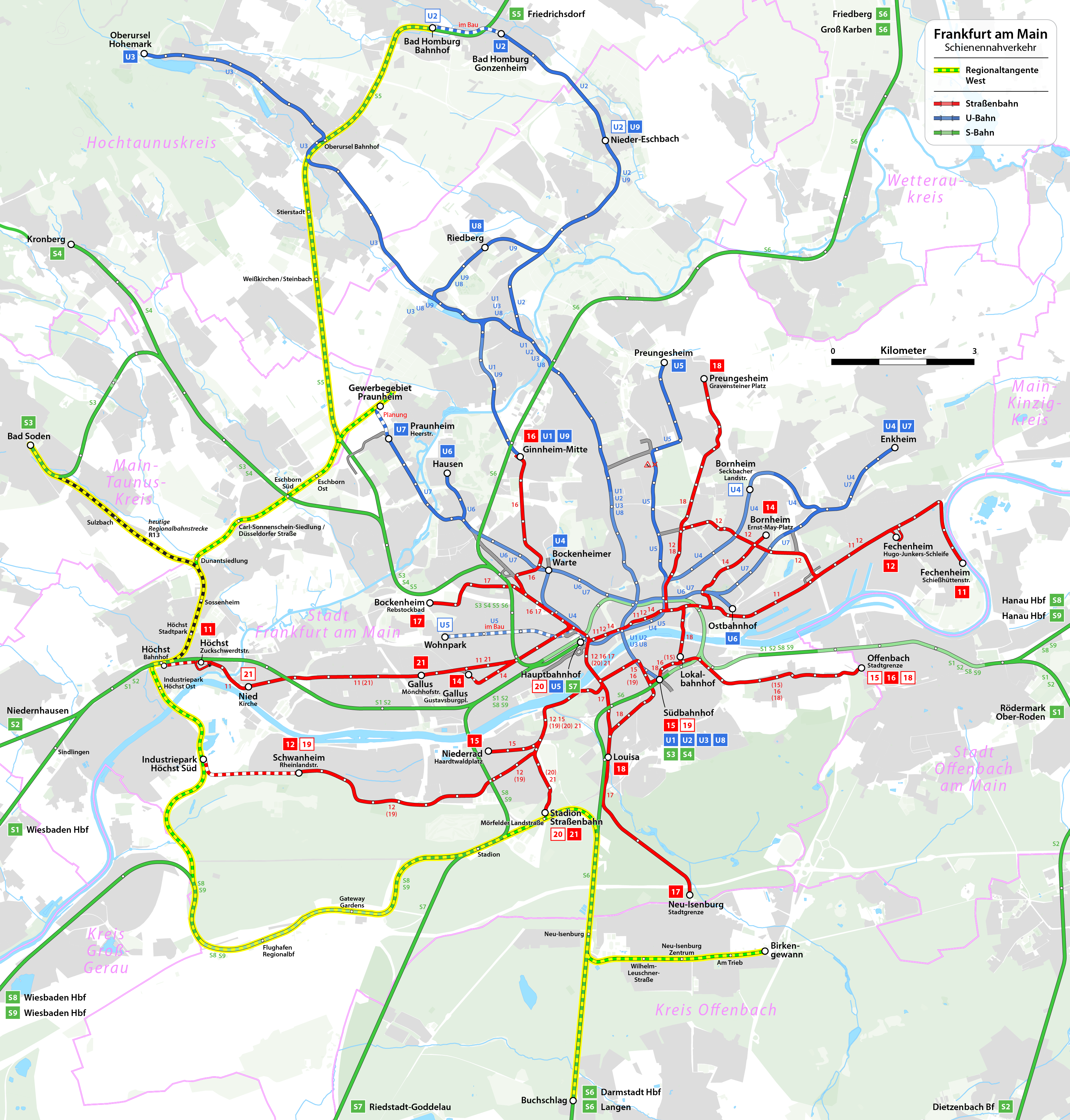
Planned route

The Regionaltangente West (German for regional tangent west, RTW) is a railway project under construction in the Rhine-Main area. Contrary to existing connections, it shall establish tangential connections across the western region, avoiding Frankfurt main station and the Frankfurt City Tunnel. It will connect residential areas with commercial and industrial centers, including the Frankfurt Airport, the Industriepark Höchst and the Eschborn business parks. Oprations are expected to start in 2030.

As a tram-train, it will use both preexisting tracks (Homburg Railway, Soden Railway, Frankfurt Airport loop, Main-Neckar Railway) and new, light rail connections. Interchanges to existing connections of the Rhine-Main S-Bahn include Bad Homburg station (S5), Eschborn Süd station (S3/S4), Frankfurt-Höchst station (S1/S2), Frankfurt Airport regional station (S8/S9) and Neu-Isenburg station (S6). Additionally, a connection to line U7 of the Frankfurt U-Bahn will be established in Frankfurt-Praunheim.

The resulting connection is planned to be served by two lines, Bad Homburg – Neu-Isenburg center and Praunheim/Bad Soden – Dreieich-Buchschlag, with the latter line being divided in its northern section. With both lines running every 30 minutes, there will be a train every 15 minutes in the central section between Eschborn and Neu-Isenburg.
