= Dreieich-Buchschlag station =

Railway station in Dreieich, Germany

Dreieich Buchschlag
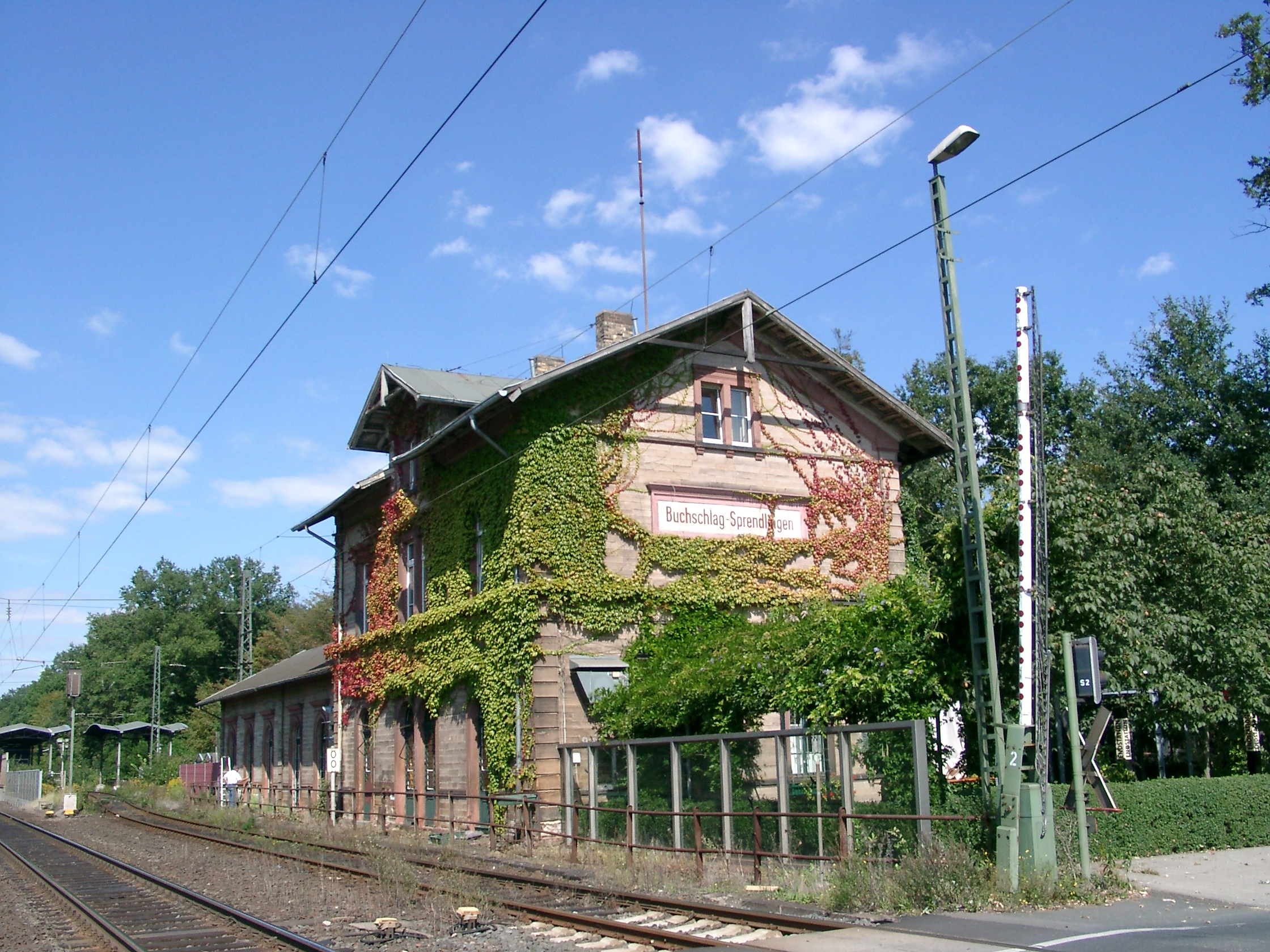

General information
- Location: Buchschlager Allee 2 63303, Dreieich, Hesse; Germany
- Coordinates: 50°01′21″N 8°39′39″E
- Owner: Deutsche Bahn
- Operator: DB Netz; DB Station&Service
- Lines: Main-Neckar railway (7.2 km, KBS 3601 and 3688); Dreieich Railway (0.0 km)
- Platforms: 3

Construction
- Accessible: Yes

Other information
- Station code: 945
- DS100 code: *FBUS: FBUSS (S-Bahn)
- IBNR: 8001236
- Category: 4
- Fare zone: : 3525
- Website: www.bahnhof.de

History
- Opened: 1879

Services
Preceding station	DB Regio Mitte	Following station
Neu Isenburg towards Frankfurt (Main) Hbf	RB 61	Dreieich-Sprendlingen towards Dieburg
Preceding station	Rhine-Main S-Bahn	Following station
Neu Isenburg towards Friedberg (Hess)	S6 (Rhine-Main S-Bahn)	Langen Flugsicherung towards Darmstadt Hbf
Location

Dreieich-Buchschlag station is a railway station on the Rhine-Main S-Bahn in the town of Dreieich in the German state of Hesse. It was opened in 1879 on the Main-Neckar Railway. The station is classified by Deutsche Bahn as a category 4 station.

== History ==
The station was opened in 1879 with the name of Buchschlag-Sprendlingen on the Main-Neckar Railway line. It opened up a forest district in the municipality of Mitteldick. In order to stimulate the development of the surrounding communities, it was decided on 1 April 1905 to build the Dreieich Railway (Dreieichbahn) between Buchschlag-Sprendlingen and Ober-Roden. Buchschlag-Sprendlingen station was renamed Dreieich-Buchschlag on 1 January 1977.

== Location ==
The station is located on the western edge of Buchschlag on Buchschlager Allee (continuing to the west as Wald am Mitteldicker Weg) on the Main-Neckar Railway, connecting Frankfurt and Heidelberg. Shortly south of the station, the Dreieich Railway branches off to Rödermark-Ober Roden.

== Connections ==
Today, the station is in the territory of the Rhein-Main-Verkehrsverbund (Rhine-Main Transport Association, RMV), with S-Bahn services operated by the Rhine-Main S-Bahn and regional services operated by Deutsche Bahn. In addition, it has two bus stops, a taxi stand and park and ride facility.

== Infrastructure ==
The entrance building of Dreieich-Buchschlag station has been sold off and now houses a restaurant. There is still a sign reading Buchschlag-Sprendlingen on the station building.

Immediately next to the entrance building, there are 5 tracks passing over a level crossing over Buchschlager Allee. Since many trains pass over the crossing, the barriers can remain closed for a long time. In 1999 the barrier was closed for 46 minutes per hour on average. Since then this has only increased due to more scheduled trains. Waiting times can regularly surpass 60 minutes for a crossing during rush hour. A small tunnel under the railway tracks exists north of the station and is used exclusively by taxis and the public bus using a remote-controlled barrier. Opening this tunnel for public use is not feasible due to its narrowness which would cause gridlock. All plans on establishing a publicly usable bypass road have been discontinued in 2011 due to protest from local residents.

== Public transport services ==
=== Rail ===
The station is served by the Rhine-Main S-Bahn and DB Regio services.

S-Bahn lines S6 stops at the station every fifteen minutes from Monday to Saturday. The Regionalbahn RB 61 service (Dreieich Railway) runs from Dieburg to Frankfurt every 60 minutes. On weekdays there are additional services between Rödermark Ober-Roden and Neu-Isenburg resulting in a service every 30 minutes on the common section.

=== Bus ===
Some bus routes stop at the station, mainly city bus line OF-64. During the summer months (May 1 to September/October) each year, Waldseebus (OF-Line 65) runs to and from Langener Waldsee, a popular Baggersee (lake established in an abandoned quarry) used as part of the Ironman Germany triathlon competition.
