= Rödermark =

- Town
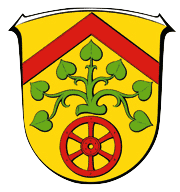
- Coat of arms

- Location of Rödermark within Offenbach district
- Interactive map of Rödermark
- Location within Germany Location within Hesse
- Coordinates: 49°58′N 8°49′E
- Country: Germany
- State: Hesse
- Admin. region: Darmstadt
- District: Offenbach
- Subdivisions: 5 Stadtteile

Government
  - Mayor (2019–31): Jörg Rotter (CDU)

Area
  - Total: 29.99 km^{2} (11.58 sq mi)
- Elevation: 142 m (466 ft)

Population (2025-12-31)
  - Total: 28,869
  - Density: 962.6/km^{2} (2,493/sq mi)
- Time zone: UTC+01:00 (CET)
  - Summer (DST): UTC+02:00 (CEST)
- Postal codes: 63322
- Dialling codes: 06074
- Vehicle registration: OF
- Website: www.roedermark.de

Rödermark (German pronunciation: [ˈʁøːdɐmaʁk]) is a town in the Offenbach district in the Regierungsbezirk of Darmstadt in Hesse, Germany, southeast of Frankfurt am Main and northeast of Darmstadt.

== Geography ==
=== Location ===
The town lies mostly in the Messeler Hügelland, a part of the Lower Main Plain with gentle hills. Differences in elevation are slight, reaching from about 130 m above sea level on the Rodau riverside flats east of Ober-Roden up to about 200 m above sea level on the Bulau. Rödermark is surrounded by greenbelts, found mainly in the area of the river Rodau. The Rodau crosses the municipal area from west to east. The northern areas of Bulau, Messenhausen and Waldacker have a mainly residential function, whereas the main centres of Ober-Roden and Urberach offer a complete infrastructure. The nearest Autobahn interchanges are ten kilometres away, and Frankfurt Airport some 25 km away. Rödermark lies within the area covered by the Rhein-Main-Verkehrsverbund, and on the grounds of Rödermark-Ober-Roden station’s favourable location, it is the terminus of Rhine-Main S-Bahn line S1 and a station on RMV line 61.

The fiftieth parallel of north latitude (50°N) passes through the municipal area.

=== Neighbouring communities ===
Rödermark borders in the north on the town of Dietzenbach, in the east on the town of Rodgau, in the south on the communities of Eppertshausen and Messel (both in Darmstadt-Dieburg) and in the west on the town of Dreieich.

=== Constituent communities ===
Rödermark’s Stadtteile are Messenhausen with 796 inhabitants, Ober-Roden with 12,749 inhabitants, Urberach with 11,537 inhabitants, Waldacker with 2,885 inhabitants and Bulau (as at 30 June 2007).

==== Ober-Roden ====
The community of Ober-Roden, which until 1977 was self-administering, is today the biggest of the five constituent communities. Through suburbanization in the 1960s and 1970s, Ober-Roden became an important residential community for commuters.

The town library, the cultural hall, the daycare centre and the primary school all stand right on the brook, the Rodau, in Ober-Roden’s centre and with the stately Gothic Parish Church of St. Nazarius (locally sometimes called the Rodgaudom – Rodgau Cathedral – although it is no such thing), some timber-frame houses and an outdoor café are also at the town square.

Ober-Roden is the location of the comprehensive school and Europaschule (European school) Oswald-von-Nell-Breuning-Schule

===== Transport in Ober-Roden =====
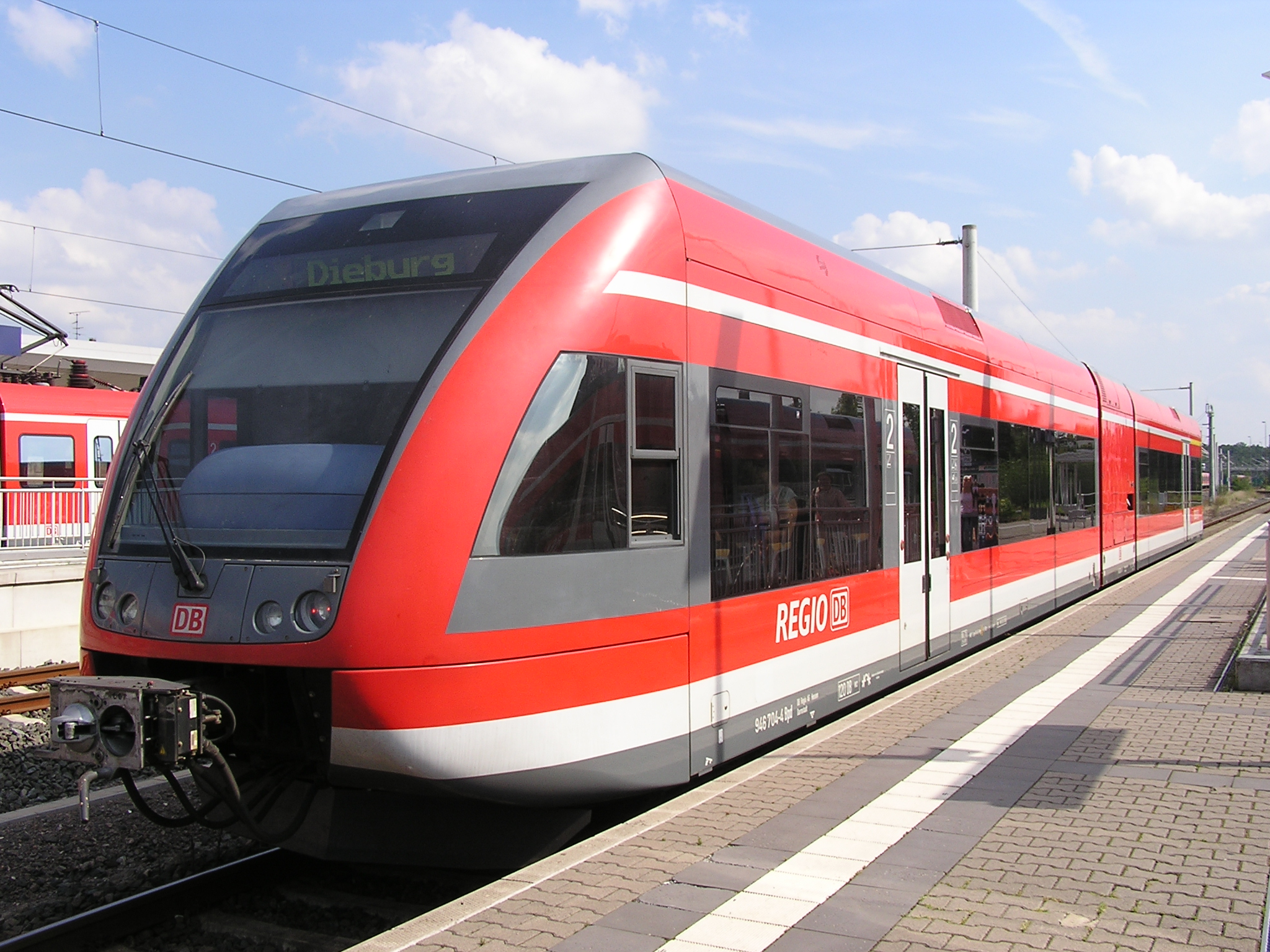
S-Bahn and local transport meet at Ober-Roden railway station

Ober-Roden is a local rail transport hub. From here begins line S 1 of the Rhine-Main S-Bahn towards Wiesbaden by way of Offenbach Ost, Frankfurt Hbf and Frankfurt-Höchst. Also found in Ober-Roden is an operational midpoint on the Dreieich Railway (Dreieichbahn) offering links to Urberach and Dreieich (from Dreieich-Buchschlag to Langen, Darmstadt, Frankfurt Airport and Frankfurt Hauptbahnhof) and serving Dieburg in the other direction. From there connections are available to Aschaffenburg, Darmstadt and places in the Odenwald.

In connection with the plans for the Regionaltangente West (RTW) project, running the Dreieichbahn with RTW trains was considered in the past. For Ober-Roden, this would have meant a direct rail link with Frankfurt Airport. The financing for the needed line expansion, however, is long-term, and the project, at least for the present, does not appear in the general transport plan.

==== Urberach ====
Urberach was until 31 December 1976 a self-administering community in what was then the Dieburg district. Since municipal reform came into force in Hesse on 1 January 1977, Urberach has been a constituent community of Rödermark, and since then has also belonged to the Offenbach district. Nevertheless, Urberach dwellers today still feel more of a connection with Dieburg and Darmstadt than with Offenbach.

Rödermark has developed into a residential area. Renovations to part of the town centre in 2003 and 2004, the shops located there, the markets on the outskirts, a bathhouse with sauna facilities and greenspace (reopened in June 2006 after renovation), and the hilly location of Bulau area, valued as a recreation site are among the features of the town.

Urberach was in the past a centre for the potter’s craft. A pottery museum, a pottery market and the clay vessel in Urberach’s coat of arms all recall this tradition.

Urberach has been since 2002 the seat of the newly founded Berufsakademie Rhein-Main, a professional academy whose focus is on economics and business informatics.

Urberach dwellers call themselves Orwischer.

== Population development ==
(each time as at 31 December)

- 1998: 25,787
- 1999: 25,814
- 2000: 26,049
- 2001: 26,126
- 2002: 26,285
- 2003: 26,289
- 2004: 28,189
- 2005: 28,107
- 2006: 26,161
- 2008: 27.858
- 2011: 26.297
- 2012: 27.805
- 2013: 26.494
- 2015: 27.242

== History ==
Rödermark was founded on 1 January 1977 out of the up until this point self-administering communities of Ober-Roden and Urberach. On 23 August 1980, Rödermark was officially granted town rights. The name goes back to the late mediaeval communal forest (marca raodora) known as the Rödermark.

Celtic finds have been unearthed in archaeological digs in town.

=== History of Ober-Roden ===
There is some likelihood that there was once a convent in the community that was put under the Lorsch Abbey by Abbess Aba in 786, but final proof of this is still lacking. The settlement of Rotaha had its first documentary mention in 790 in a donation to the Lorsch Abbey. Furthermore, a Frankish nobleman named Erlulf donated all his holdings in Ober-Roden, Nieder-Roden and Bieber to the Lorsch Abbey on 22 April 791.

In 903, the Rotaha monastery was confirmed as the Lorsch Abbey’s tenant. The parish church in Ober-Roden is, like the abbey itself, consecrated to Saint Nazarius, and was Mother Church for Urberach, Nieder-Roden, Messel and Dudenhofen.

As part of the Amt of Steinheim, the village was sold in 1425 by the former landlords, the Lords of Eppstein, to Electoral Mainz. For the next several centuries the Electoral Prince-Archbishop of Mainz was the landlord.

In 1576 there were 80 households here, but in 1681 there were only 31 households and 117 inhabitants.

In 1786, the communally held land shared by Ober-Roden and several other villages was partitioned and shared out among Ober-Roden, Nieder-Roden, Urberach, Messel, Dietzenbach, Hainhausen, Jügesheim and Dudenhofen.

The Amtsvogtei of Dieburg passed with Ober-Roden after Secularization to Hesse. In 1829, Ober-Roden had 1,295 inhabitants. In 1832, the place passed from the Landratsbezirk of Langen to the Offenbach district. From 1874 to 1977, the community belonged to the Dieburg district.

In 1896, the Rodgaubahn (railway) from Offenbach am Main by way of Ober-Roden to Dieburg was built, as was the Dreieichbahn by way of Urberach to Sprendlingen in 1905.

In 1939, the community had 3,608 inhabitants. In 1957, Messenhausen merged with Ober-Roden after having shared with it the same mayor since 1821, while still keeping its own municipal budget. In 1977 in the course of municipal reform in Hesse, Ober-Roden was merged with Urberach, whereupon the new amalgamated municipality became Rödermark.

=== History of Urberach ===
Urberach was named for the first time in 796 as a branch parish of Ober-Roden according to the Lorsch codex. The place had its first documentary mention in 1275 as Orbruch. Electoral Mainz acquired the lordly rights over Urberach in the Late Middle Ages. The village belonged to the Mainz Amt of Dieburg.

In 1280, part of Urberach ended up with Frankfurt as a fief.

In 1305, an estate from Urbruch belonged to Ober-Roden.

In 1425, Urbruch and Ober-Roden were sold to the Archbishop of Mainz.

In 1706, the Archbishop of Mainz, Lothar Franz von Schönborn, ceded Urbarach to Count Johann Philipp of Isenburg-Büdingen in exchange for Weisenau and Hechtsheim. Urberach thenceforth belonged to the Amt of Philippseich, a younger line of the House of Isenburg.

In 1786 the Röder Mark was dissolved.

After the Principality of Isenburg-Birstein was dissolved in 1816, Urberach passed to the Grand Duchy of Hesse and has been Hessian ever since. In 1821, the community was grouped into the Landratsbezirk of Offenbach and in 1832 assigned to the Offenbach district. From 1874 to 1977, Urberach belonged to the Dieburg district.

The population figure rose from 1,488 in 1861 to 2,807 in 1939 and 9,558 in 1978. In 1977 in the course of municipal reform in Hesse, Urberach was merged with Ober-Roden, whereupon the new amalgamated municipality became Rödermark.

=== History of Messenhausen ===
The village had its first documentary mention in 1282. In the time that followed, the Lords of Eppstein enfeoffed various noble families with Messenhausen. Up until the end of the Holy Roman Empire in 1806, the Lords of Frankenstein had been the fiefholders for centuries. In 1806, the community passed to the Grand Duchy of Hesse.

In 1821, Messenhausen’s mayoral office was united with Ober-Roden’s, although each place maintained its own budget up until 1957, when Messenhausen joined Ober-Roden. Messenhausen had 80 inhabitants in 1829 and 605 in 1978.

== Churches ==
Rödermark’s traditional character is Catholic. Owing to migration into the town in the latter half of the 20th century, however, many Evangelical Christians now also live here. Today there are five Christian parishes:

- St. Nazarius Ober-Roden (Catholic)
- Ober-Roden (Evangelical)
- St. Gallus Urberach (Catholic)
- Petrusgemeinde Urberach (Evangelical)
- Free Evangelical parish of Rödermark

The oldest ecclesiastical building in Rödermark is the Dreifaltigkeitskapelle (“Trinity Chapel”) on the way into the community of Messenhausen (built in 1820).

== Politics ==
=== Town council ===
The municipal elections held from 2006 to 2021 yielded the following results:

| Parties and voter communities | | % 2021 | Seats 2021 | % 2016 | Seats 2016 | % 2011 | Seats 2011 | % 2006 | Seats 2006 |
| CDU | Christian Democratic Union of Germany | 33.7 | 13 | 39.5 | 15 | 41.0 | 16 | 47.1 | 22 |
| AL/Grüne | Andere Liste Rödermark/Grüne | 32.4 | 13 | 24.2 | 10 | 33.5 | 13 | 28.1 | 13 |
| SPD | Social Democratic Party of Germany | 12.8 | 5 | 15.9 | 6 | 15.6 | 6 | 17.1 | 8 |
| FDP | Free Democratic Party | 9.2 | 3 | 10.0 | 4 | 5.0 | 2 | 7.8 | 3 |
| FWR | Free Voters Rödermark | 10.3 | 4 | 10.4 | 4 | 4.9 | 2 | — | — |
| AfD | AfD Rödermark | 1.7 | 1 | — | — | — | — | — | — |
| Total | | 100 | 39 | 100 | 39 | 100 | 39 | 100 | 45 |
| Voter turnout in % | | 52.4 | | 54.5 | | 54.5 | | 47.7 | |

=== Mayors ===
Rödermark’s mayors since 1977 have been:

- Karl Martin Rebel, CDU (1977–1982)
- Walter Faust, CDU (1982–1993)
- Alfons Maurer, CDU (1993–2005)
- Roland Kern, AL/Greens (2005–2019)
- Jörg Rotter, CDU (2019–present)

== Twin towns – sister cities ==
Rödermark is twinned with:

- Tramin an der Weinstraße, Italy (1975, originally with Urberach)
- Saalfelden am Steinernen Meer, Austria (1976, originally with Ober-Roden)
- Bodajk, Hungary (1992)
- Pleśna, Poland (2022)

== Economy ==
Rödermark’s economy is based on midsize businesses. Besides the many retail and craft businesses, the following major companies are resident in Rödermark:

- CeoTronics AG (speech transmission)
- Zeppelin Systems GmbH (mechanical engineering)
- Winkelmann Palsis (vibration technology)
- Elta (consumer electronics, cooling appliances)
- Videor E. Hartig GmbH (video technology distribution)
- Köhl (office furniture)
- Adicon (building)
- Schleinkofer GmbH (mechanical engineering)
- Galvanni Europe GmbH (clothes)

== Notable people ==
- Peter Kunter (born 1941), footballer, lives in Rödermark and had a dental practice in Urberach in 1974–2005
- Bernd Spier (born 1944), singer, lives in Waldacker and has been running a real estate business in Ober-Roden
- Werner Lorant (born 1948), football player and manager, lived in Ober-Roden in 1979–1982
- Kristina Bach (born 1962), singer, lived in Rödermark-Urberach in the 1990s
