= Neu Isenburg station =

Railway station in Neu-Isenburg, Germany

Neu-Isenburg
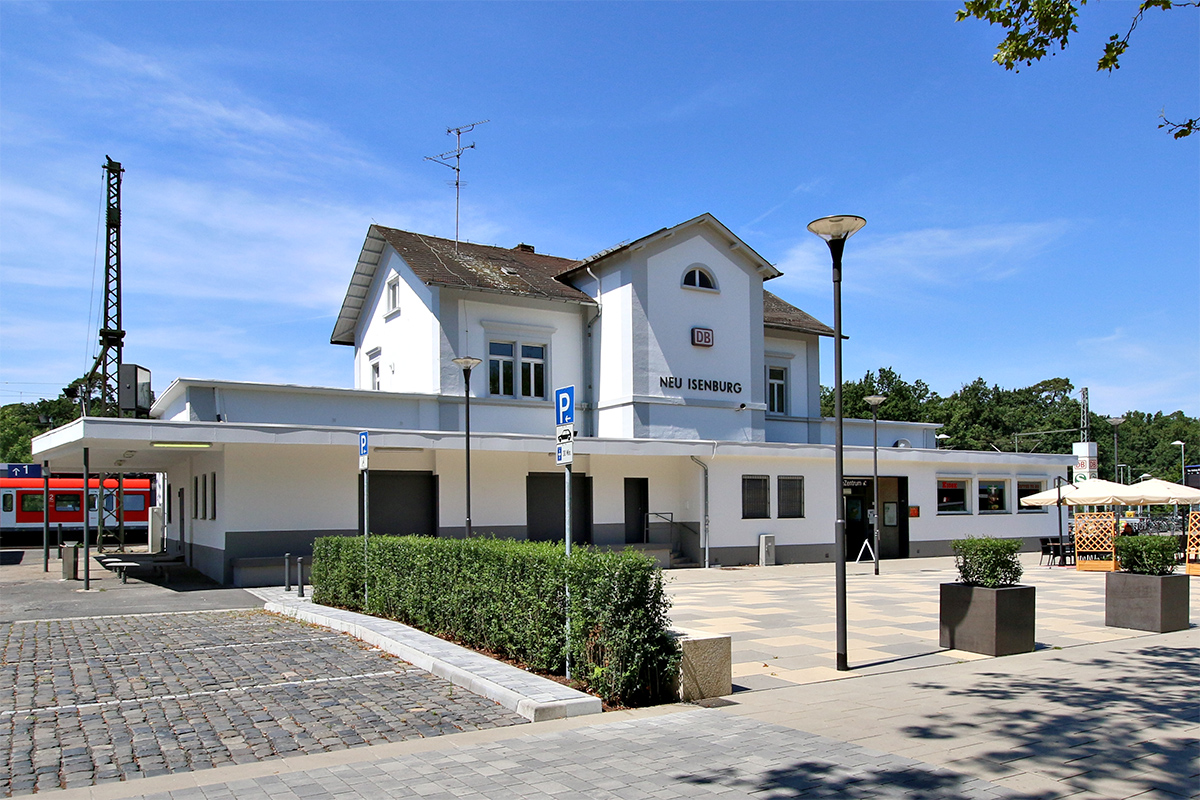

General information
- Location: Bahnhofstr. 300, Neu-Isenburg, Hesse; Germany
- Coordinates: 50°3′10″N 8°39′57″E
- Lines: Main-Neckar railway (km 7.2, KBS 3601 and 3688)
- Platforms: 3

Construction
- Accessible: Yes, tracks 2 & 3 (S-Bahn) only

Other information
- Station code: 4351
- DS100 code: FNIS/FNISU
- IBNR: 8004246
- Category: 4
- Fare zone: : 3510
- Website: www.bahnhof.de

History
- Opened: 1 November 1852

Services
| Preceding station | DB Regio Mitte | Following station |
|---|---|---|
| Frankfurt (Main) Hbf Terminus | RB 61 | Dreieich-Buchschlag towards Dieburg |
| Preceding station | Rhine-Main S-Bahn | Following station |
| Frankfurt-Louisa towards Friedberg (Hess) | S6 (Rhine-Main S-Bahn) | Dreieich-Buchschlag towards Darmstadt Hbf |
Location

Neu-Isenburg station is on the Rhine-Main S-Bahn in Neu-Isenburg in the German state of Hesse. It was opened on 1 November 1852 and is now served by S-Bahn and regional trains operated by Deutsche Bahn. Since 29 May 1961, it has been the only station in Hesse with a loading terminal for motorail trains. In addition, it has two bus stops, a taxi stand and a park and ride car park. The station is classified by Deutsche Bahn as a category 4 station.

== Location ==
The station is located on the western edge of Neu-Isenburg at the end of Bahnhofstraße, about two kilometres from the city centre. It is on the Main-Neckar Railway, connecting Frankfurt and Heidelberg.

== History ==
Initially when the Main-Neckar Railway was opened, on 1 August 1846, there was no Neu-Isenburg station. To gain an economic benefit from the railway, the citizens of Neu-Isenburg made numerous submissions to the Ministry of Finance of the Grand Duchy of Hesse in Darmstadt, which was then responsible for transport in the state. These submissions were initially rejected. It was only at the beginning of 1852 that the request was granted and, on 1 November 1852, Isenburg station was opened. Initially, only a few used the new station. The accounts of 1852/1853 noted that receipts amounting to 107 guilders and 15 Kreuzers had been taken for the transport of passengers, animals and baggage.

Originally, the only station building was a signalman's house, which was replaced by a station building during the laying of the second track in the autumn of 1861. A year later the station was connected by telegraph.

=== Extension ===
Two shunting sidings were built in late 1873 and a rail siding was opened to the brickworks of Philipp Holzmann & Cie. in the same year, which boosted the economy of the town. All the sets of points at the site had to be operated by hand at first. The first signal box was built in 1876, which could set points and signals using wires. In 1893, the signal box was replaced by a centralised interlocking called Isb.

In 1894 the station received its first electric lights. In 1900, the northern shunting siding on the line to Darmstadt, which had in the meantime been used as a freight yard, was reinstated for shunting. Traffic at the station had already increased to 100,000 passengers and 45,000 tons of freight per year.

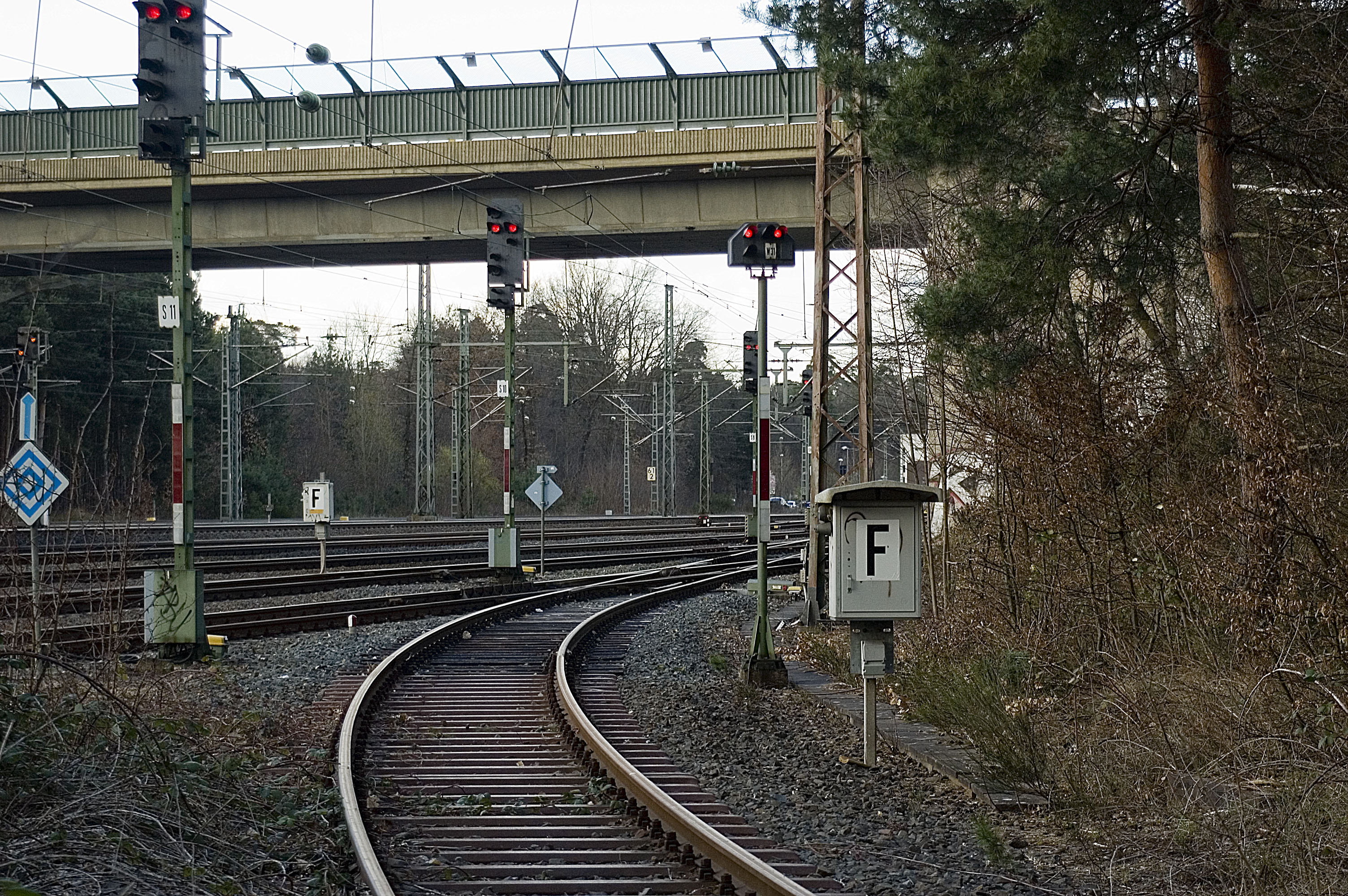
Branch to freight yard

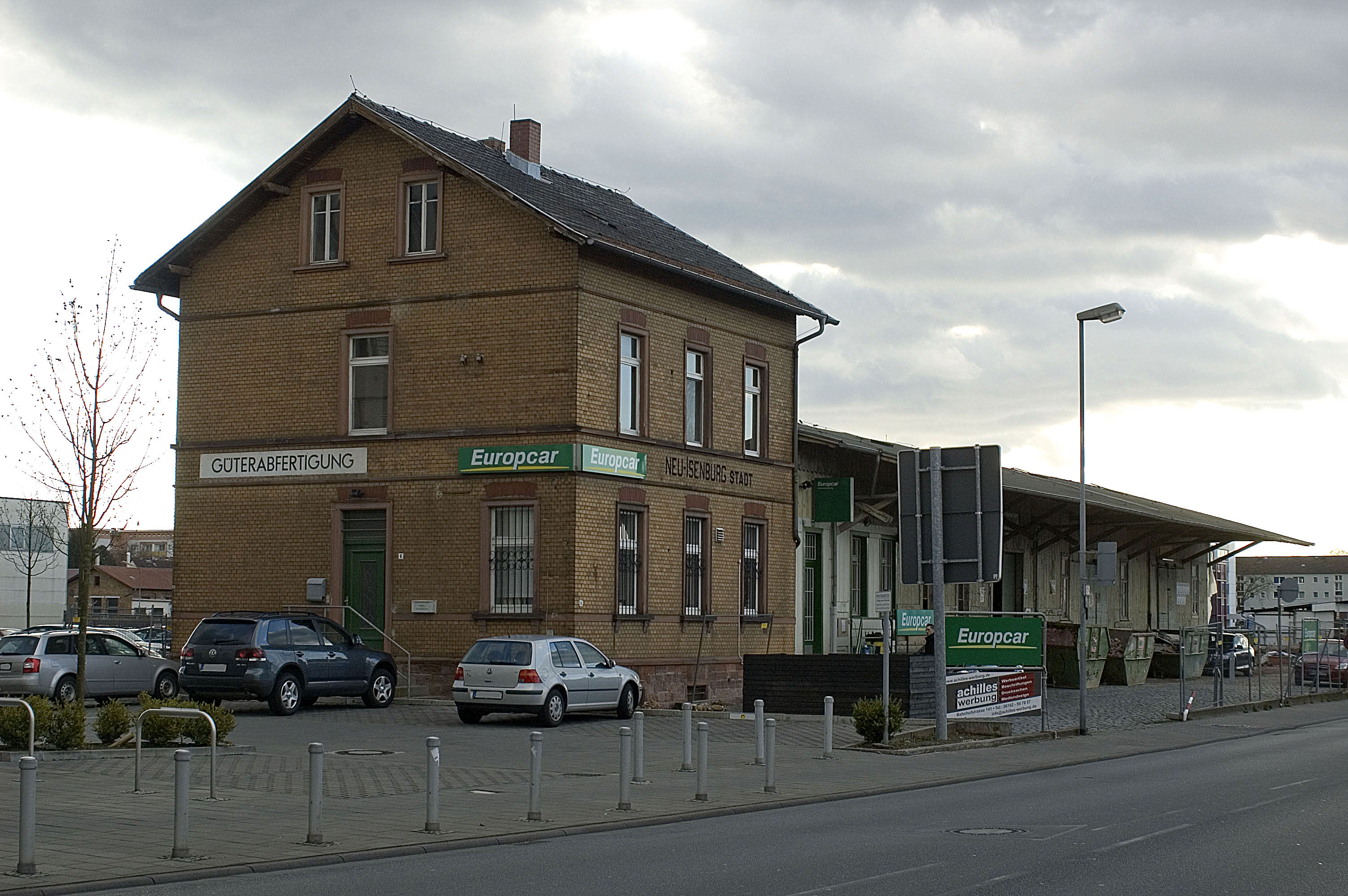
Neu-Isenburg freight yard

In 1904, a second signal box was opened with the name If.

=== Branch line to Neu-Isenburg-Stadt ===
In order to improve the railway connection to the centre of Neu-Isenburg, a branch line, which was about 2.2 km long, was commissioned to the southern part of the town on 20 March 1902. The line was single track and ran to a freight yard with six tracks. The southernmost of these tracks had two manually operated turntables, which connected to industrial sidings. This branch line only carried freight because the Frankfurt Forest Railway (Frankfurter Waldbahn,) already provided a connection from Neu-Isenburg to Frankfurt for passengers (now line 14 of the Frankfurt trams). At the end of 2006 this (never electrified) branch line was closed and the tracks were later partly removed.

=== Interwar period ===
During the occupation of the Ruhr in 1923, Neu-Isenburg station was commandeered by French troops and could not be entered by Germans. As many in Isenburg depended on a railway connection, an emergency station was established by a local railway on a siding only 400 metres away from the station in the district of Frankfurt, which was not occupied. It consisted merely of a wooden hut for the sale of tickets and a plank crossing of the track, which ensured a reasonably safe entry and exit. The provisional station only closed with the withdrawal of French troops in September 1924.

During the Second World War the town of Neu-Isenburg and its station were repeated exposed to heavy air raids, but—in contrast to other stations in the area—the entrance building was unharmed and only parts of its tracks were damaged; these were quickly repaired after the war. There was a major accident in the last days of 1945 when the dispatcher on duty left the signal box to go to a shelter in anticipation of an air raid. Previously he had set the signal to permit a train from Frankfurt to run on to track 3, without remembering that the track was still occupied by a passenger train. The collision of the trains led to the death of nearly forty people.

=== Deutsche Bundesbahn ===
In the early 1960s, Deutsche Bundesbahn decided to join the Frankfurt Rhine-Main region to the international motorail network. It chose Neu-Isenburg station as the terminal for these operations. The first car train stopped here in on 29 May 1961. In 1968, the car loading facility gained a second track.

On 14 April 1969, the Isb and If signal boxes were replaced by a new combined signal box called If, which took over the functions of the Bf and Bn signal boxes in Dreieich-Buchschlag. It is a relay interlocking of class Sp Dr S 60 (a Siemens pushbutton interlocking introduced in 1960). The interlocking is still operating today.

Shunting ended at Neu-Isenburg station in 1983. Since 1997, the station has been an S-Bahn stop.

== Public transport services ==
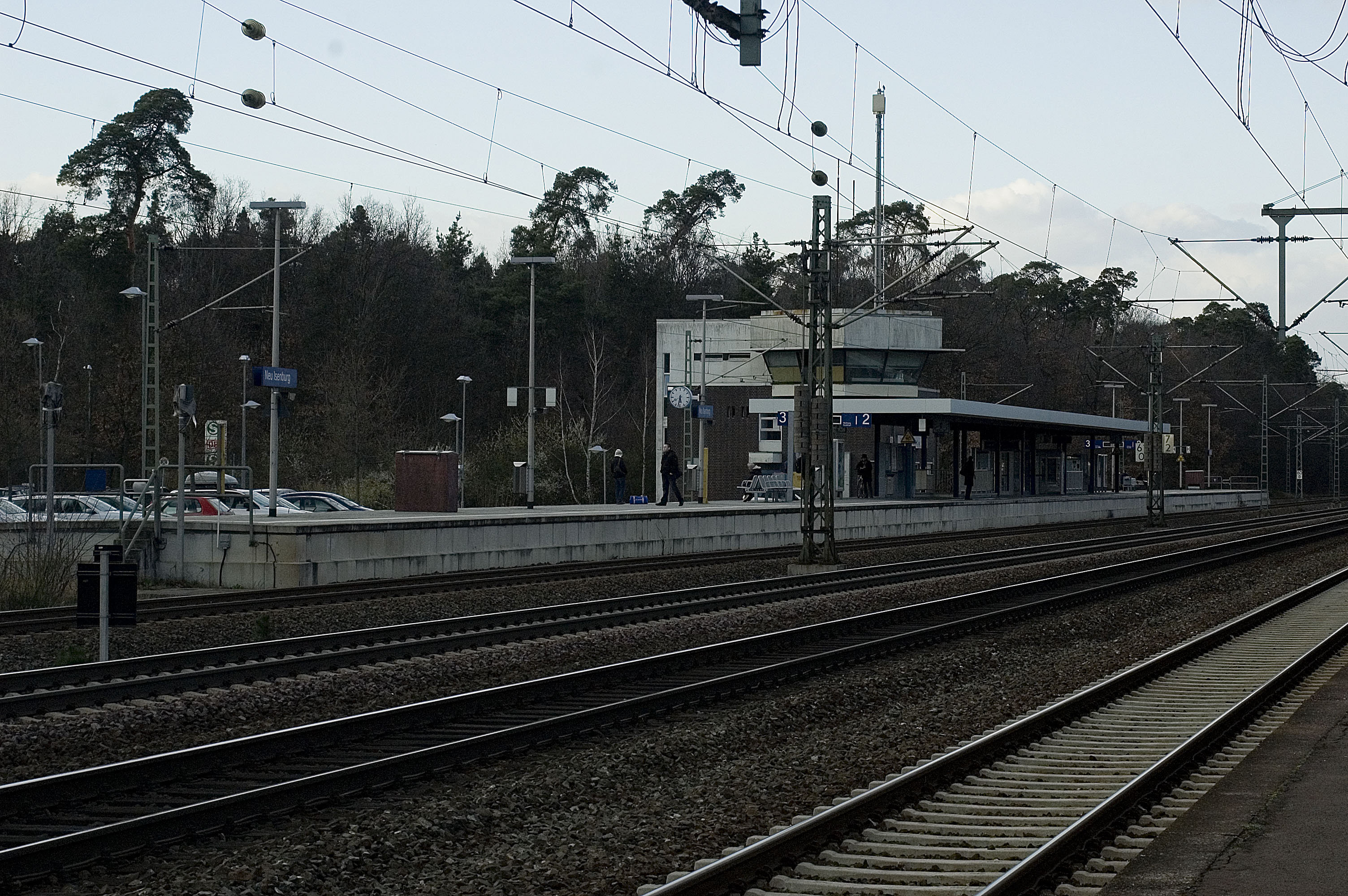
S-Bahn platform with tracks 2 and 3

=== Rail ===
The station is served by the Rhine-Main S-Bahn and DB Regio services.

S-Bahn line stops at the station every fifteen minutes on weekdays. The Regionalbahn RB 61 service (Dreieich Railway) runs Monday to Friday hourly between Neu Isenburg and Rödermark-Ober-Roden. On the weekend, these services are extended to/from Frankfurt.

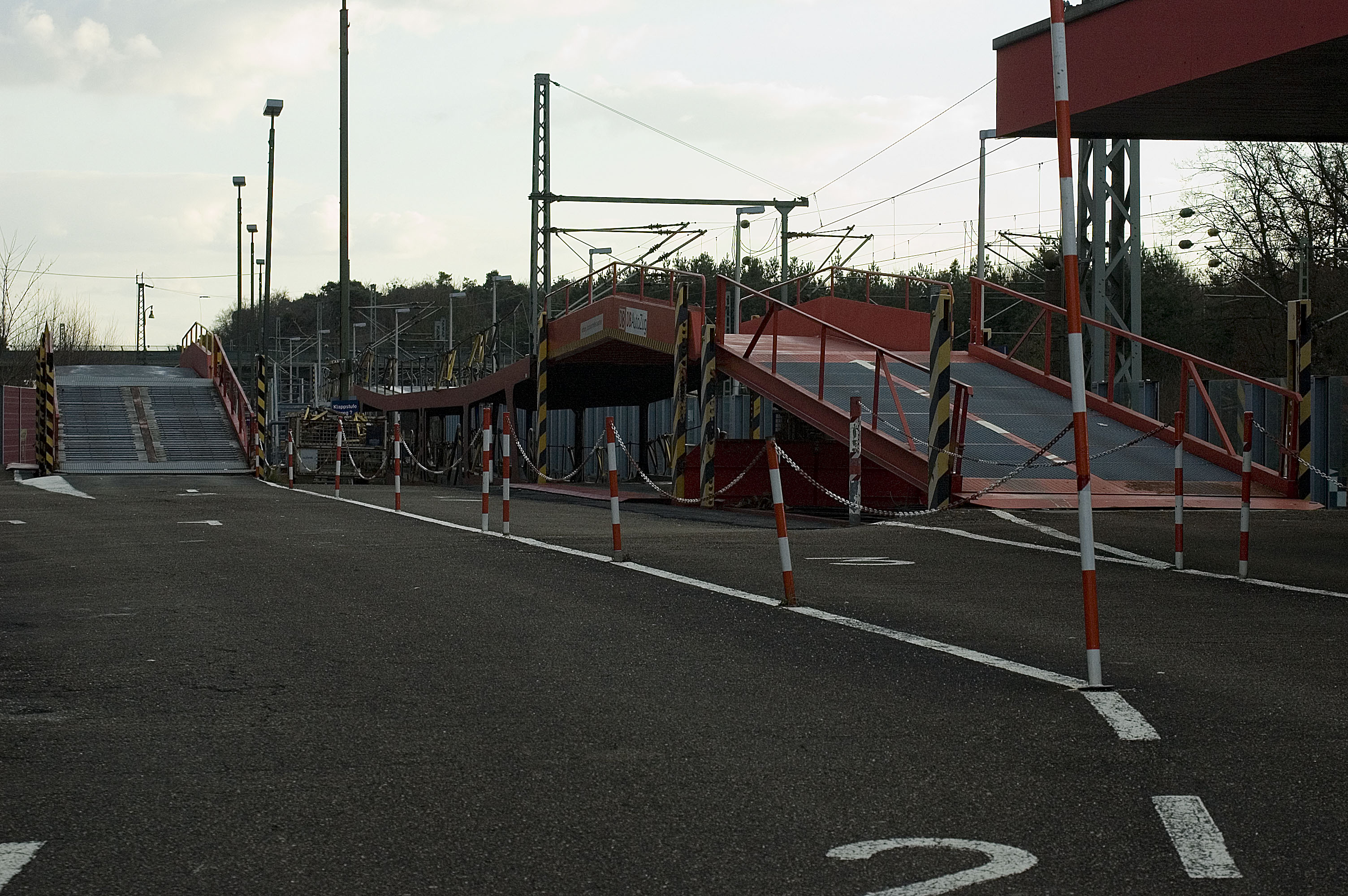
Loading dock with waggons

=== Motorail ===
The station has a loading dock for motorail trains of DB AutoZug. During the summer season approximately 10,000 vehicles were loaded at the Auto Train terminal. Passengers drove themselves over a paved ramp on to a two-story car transport waggon. In the first 25 years of the motorail terminal in Neu-Isenburg handled 200,000 vehicles. Upon the arrival of the train, the loaded wagons were attached to the train and passengers board sleeping and couchette cars. Trains ran from Neu-Isenburg to Narbonne in France, Alessandria and Verona in Italy and Villach in Austria. A glass-enclosed waiting room was available on the south side of the station for users of the service. This service was shut down in 2014 but the terminal remains intact for now.

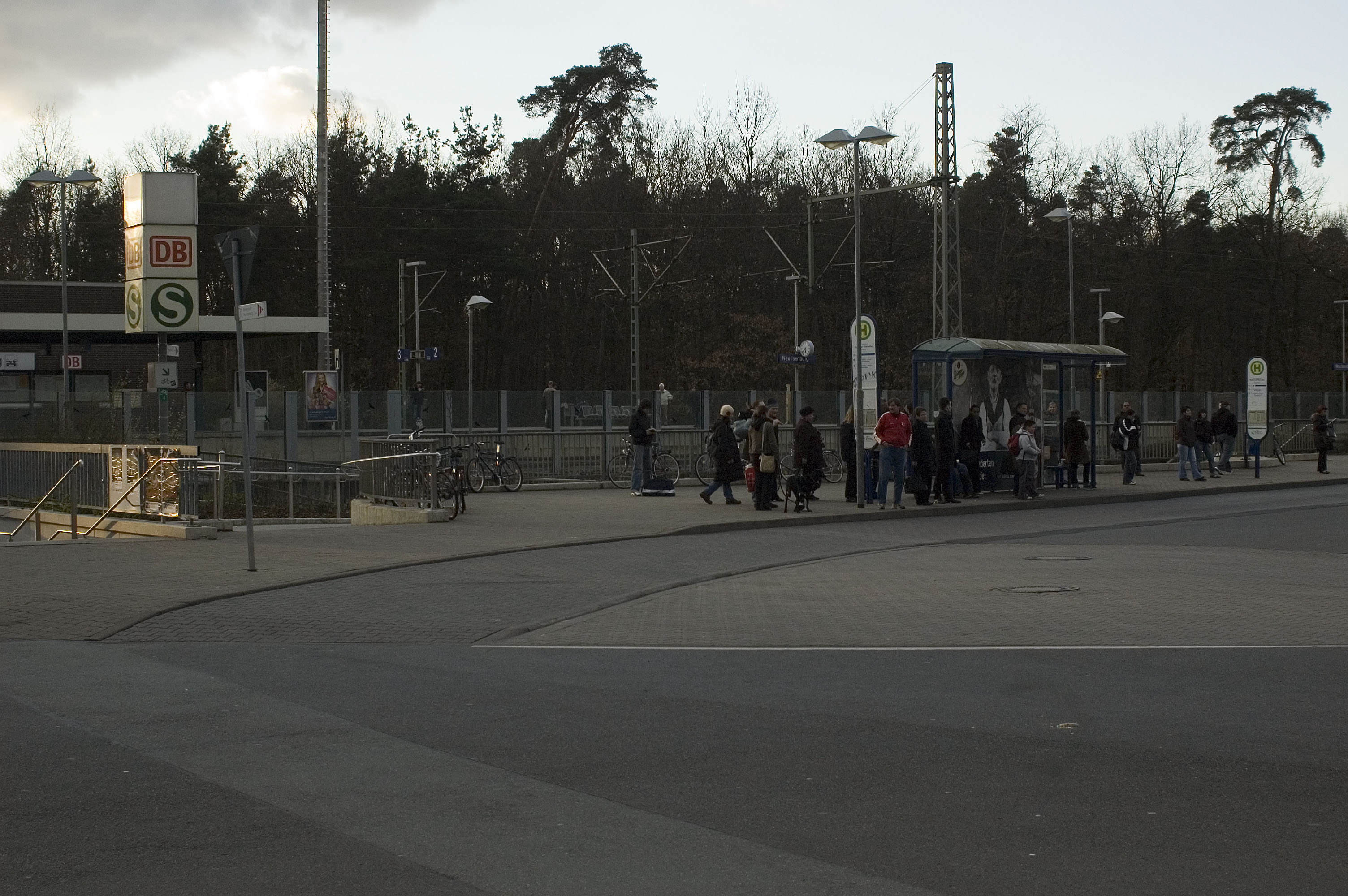
East side bus stop

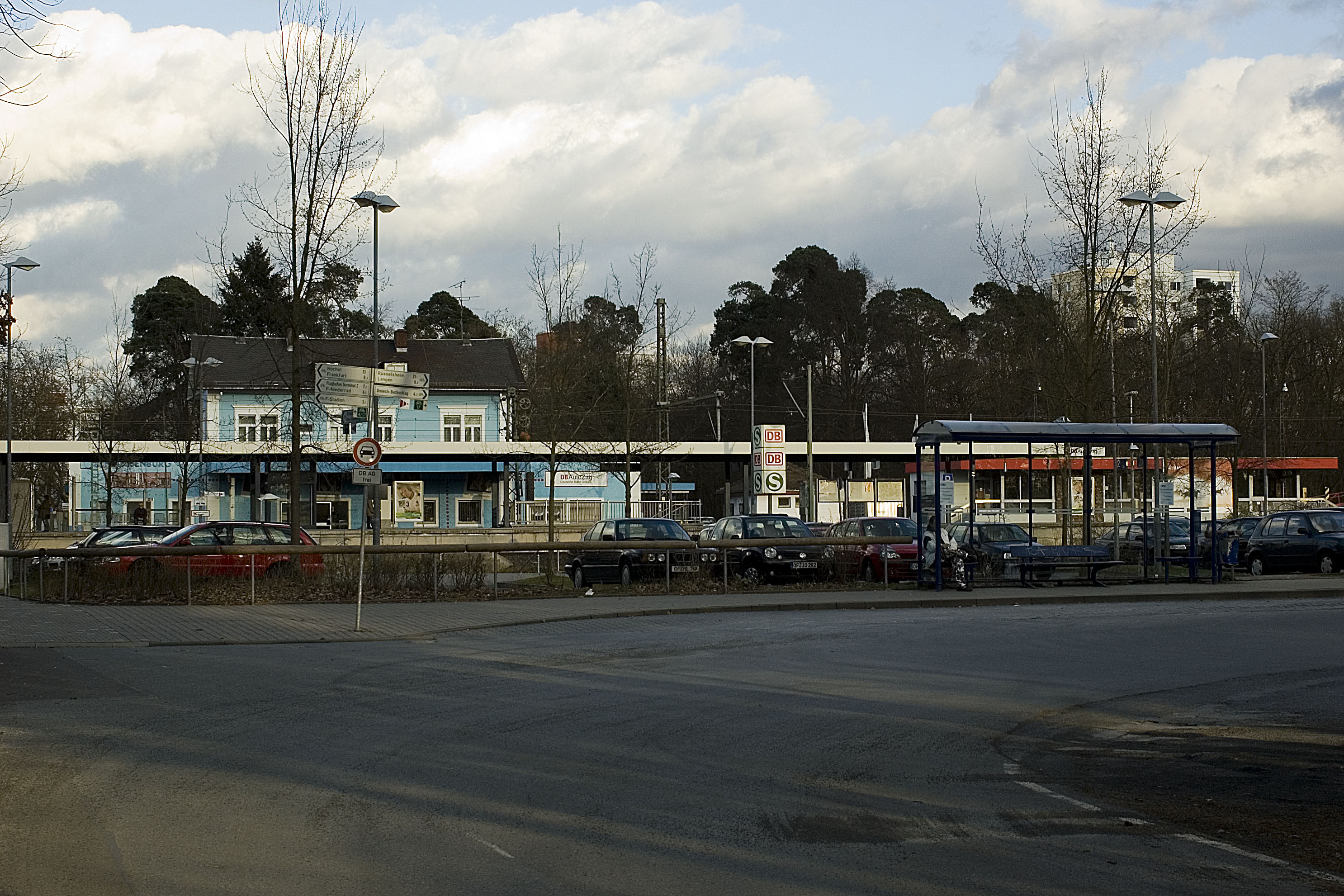
West side bus stop and Park+Ride parking area

=== Bus ===
There are bus stops on both sides of the station, served by the transport companies of the Rhein-Main-Verkehrsverbund (Rhine-Main Transport Association, RMV).

The Bahnhof Ostseite (east side) bus stops are served by buses to Neu-Isenburg-Gravenbruch (OF-51), Langen (OF-91) and Dreieich-Offenthal (OF-92)

The Bahnhof Westseite (west side) bus stops are served by buses to Terminal 1 of Frankfurt Airport (X17 X19), Hofheim im Taunus (X17), Dietzenbach (X18), Walldorf (X18), Obertshausen (X19), Dreieich-Sprendlingen (OF-67) as well as lines OF-52 and OF-53 to various destinations within Neu-Isenburg.

=== Others ===
There is a taxi rank on the east side of the station and a park and ride car park has been built on the west side. There is a restaurant, a kiosk and a travel centre and a motorail ticket office the station building. However the offices closed down in 2014.

== Track plan ==
Track plan of the station

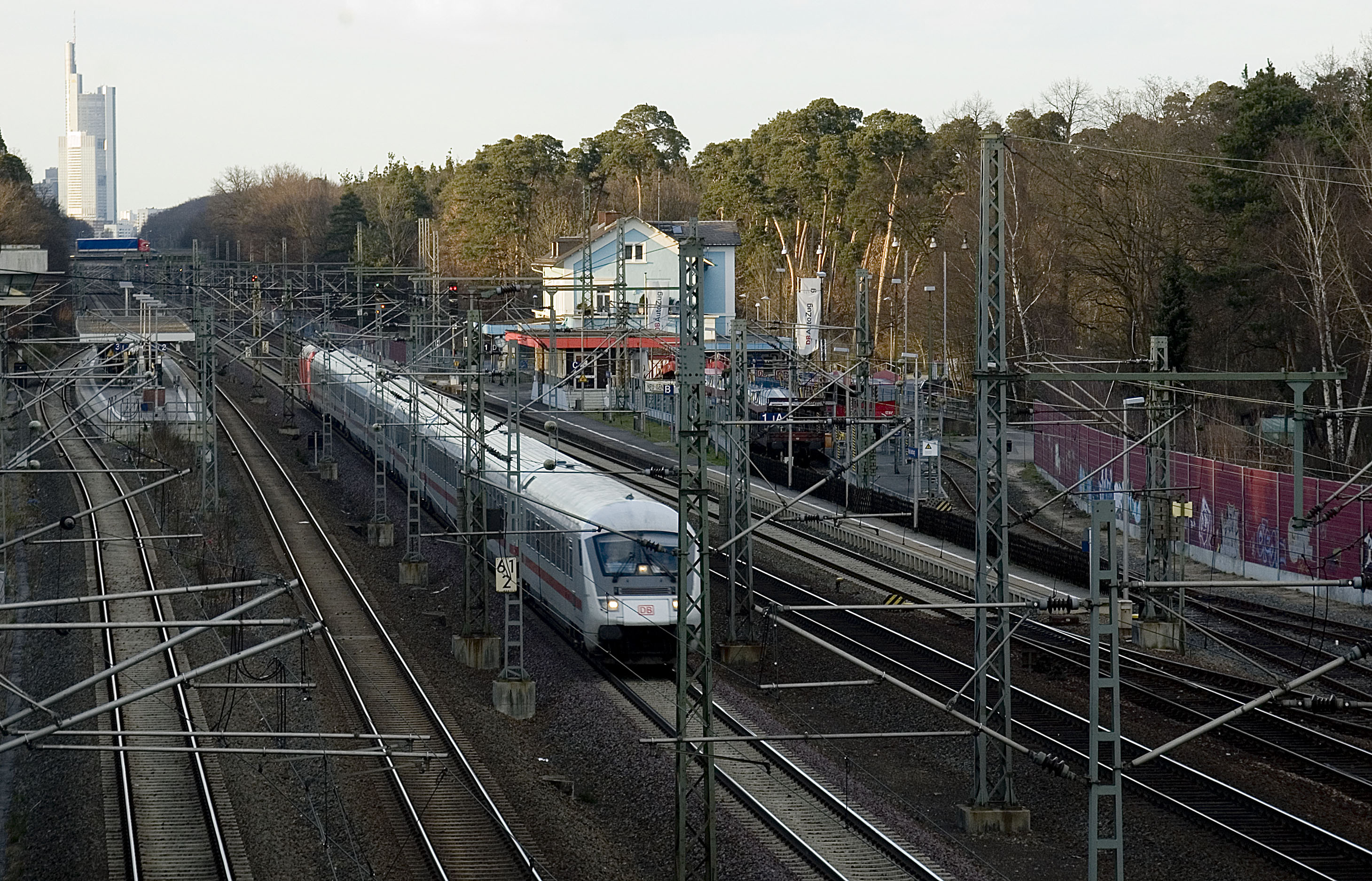
Track field

The Main-Neckar Railway runs as four tracks between Frankfurt-Louisa and Dreieich-Buchschlag. One track (line 3655) separates from the long-distance tracks of the Main-Neckar Railway north of Neu Isenburg station, which becomes platform track 1 through the station. South of the station, the eastern track reconnects to the four main line tracks after the separation of the Dreieich Railway (line 3653).

The western two tracks (line 3688) form station tracks 3 and 2, which are used by the S-Bahn. The next two tracks are part of line 3601, which is used by long-distance passenger and freight trains and do not abut platforms at the station. The single track line 3655, used by the Regionalbahn service between Dieburg and Frankfurt, forms platform track 1 through the station. East of track 1, are the tracks of the motorail terminal.
