= Dreieich Railway =

Rail line in Hesse, Germany

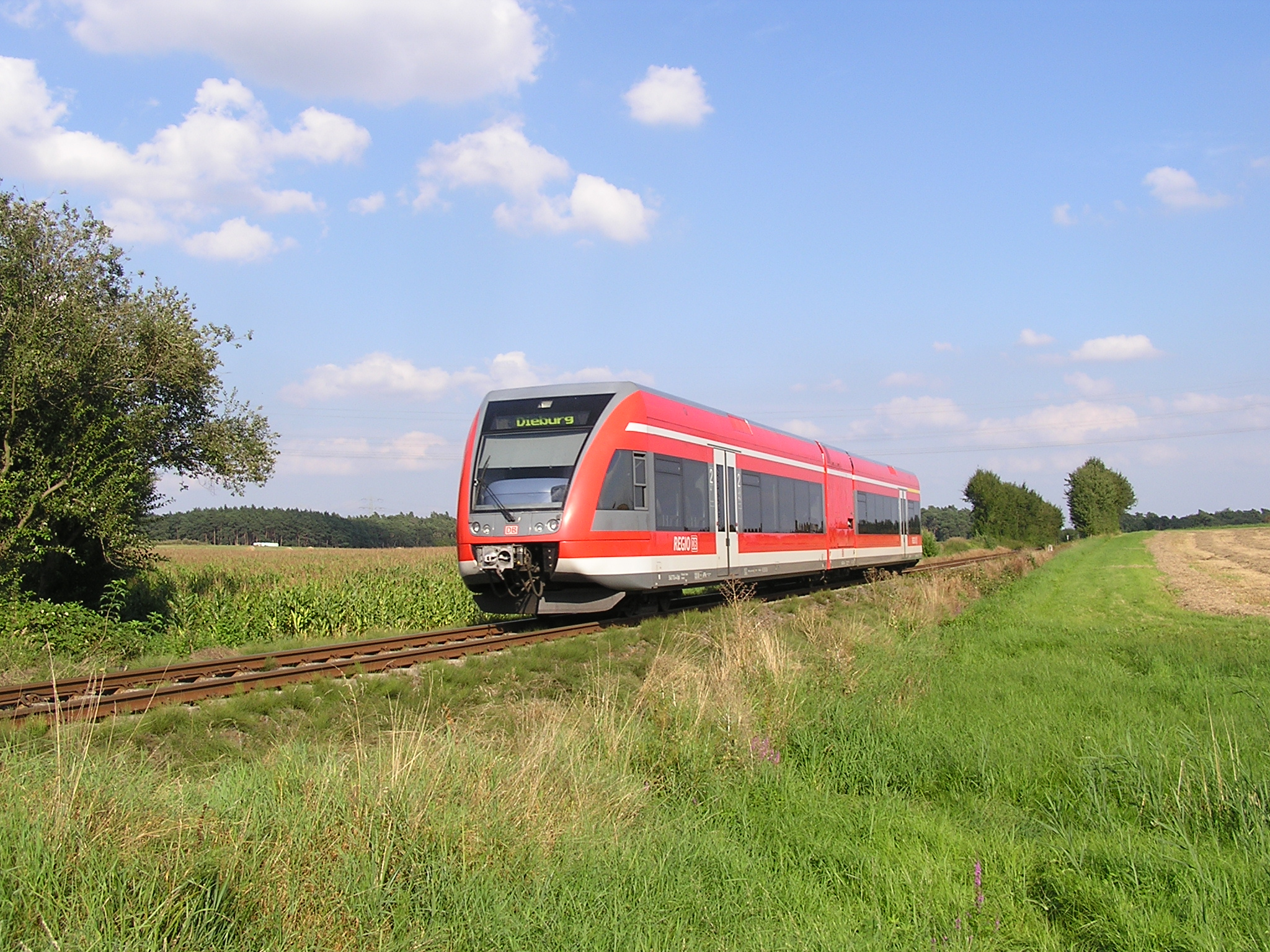
- GTW 2/6 set on its way from Offenthal to Urberach

Overview
- Native name: Dreieichbahn
- Line number: 647
- Locale: Hesse, Germany

Service
- Route number: 3653

Technical
- Line length: 23.5 km (14.6 mi)
- Number of tracks: 1
- Track gauge: 1,435 mm (4 ft 8 1/2 in) standard gauge
- Minimum radius: 300 m (980 ft)
- Operating speed: 100 km/h (62 mph)
- Maximum incline: 1.4%

The Dreieich Railway (Dreieichbahn) is a single-track, non-electrified branch line in the Frankfurt Rhine-Main area in the German state of Hesse. It connects Dreieich-Buchschlag on the Main-Neckar Railway with Rödermark-Ober Roden on the Rodgau Railway. Colloquially, the RMV route 61 (RB 61) service is referred to as the Dreieichbahn, which continued beyond Ober-Roden on the Rodgau Railway to Dieburg.

== History ==
The line was constructed by the Grand Duchy of Hesse, with a railway construction department being established in Darmstadt for the construction of the line on 15 March 1903. It was opened on 1 April 1905 and operated by the Prussian-Hessian Railway Company. The line was mainly for commuters from parts of modern Dreieich between Dreieich-Buchschlag (then: "Buchschlag-Sprendlingen") and Rödermark–Ober-Roden (then: "Ober-Roden") to Frankfurt. Operations on the line were soon upgraded between Buchschlag and Sprendlingen and—beyond Ober-Roden—to Dieburg because most of the commuters from the Reinheim and Dieburg regions wanted to go to Frankfurt or the Opel works at Rüsselsheim am Main. The Dreieich Railway offered a shorter connection than the Rodgau Railway via Offenbach. The Rodgau Railway (Offenbach–Reinheim) had been opened between Ober-Roden and Dieburg on 1 October 1896.

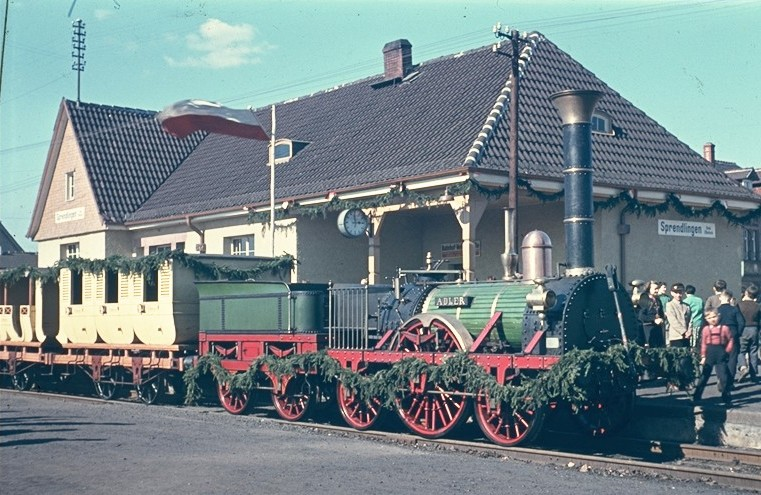
Adler replica in Sprendlingen station (today: Dreieich-Sprendlingen) during the line's 50th anniversary (1955)

At the beginning of the 1980s, the Dreieich Railway was listed by Deutsche Bundesbahn (DB) as a vulnerable line. Since 1990, there has been no regular freight traffic on it. The lobbying of the Interessengemeinschaft Dreieichbahn ("Dreieich Railway interest group", IGDB) and municipal politics prevented the closure of the line. As early as 1988, there were initial plans to modernise the Dreieich Railway, which was implemented from the mid-1990s. The comprehensively modernised Dreieich Railway was opened in 1998. The costs were borne by Deutsche Bahn (DB), the state of Hesse and neighbouring municipalities.

Since an extension of the S1 S-Bahn line from Rödermark–Ober-Roden to Dieburg was classified as uneconomic, the operating concept was maintained, with trains running to Dieburg. This part of the Rodgau Railway was upgraded for diesel operations and services on the line continued to run through over the Dreieich Railway.

The 100th anniversary of the Dreieich Railway was celebrated on 1 and 2 April 2005 with steam specials.

The extension of the direct award of the operation of rail transport services for the period from December 2011 to December 2013 to the former operator DB Regio was announced in the Official Journal of the European Union on 13 December 2011. This direct award was later extended until June 2016.

== Current situation ==
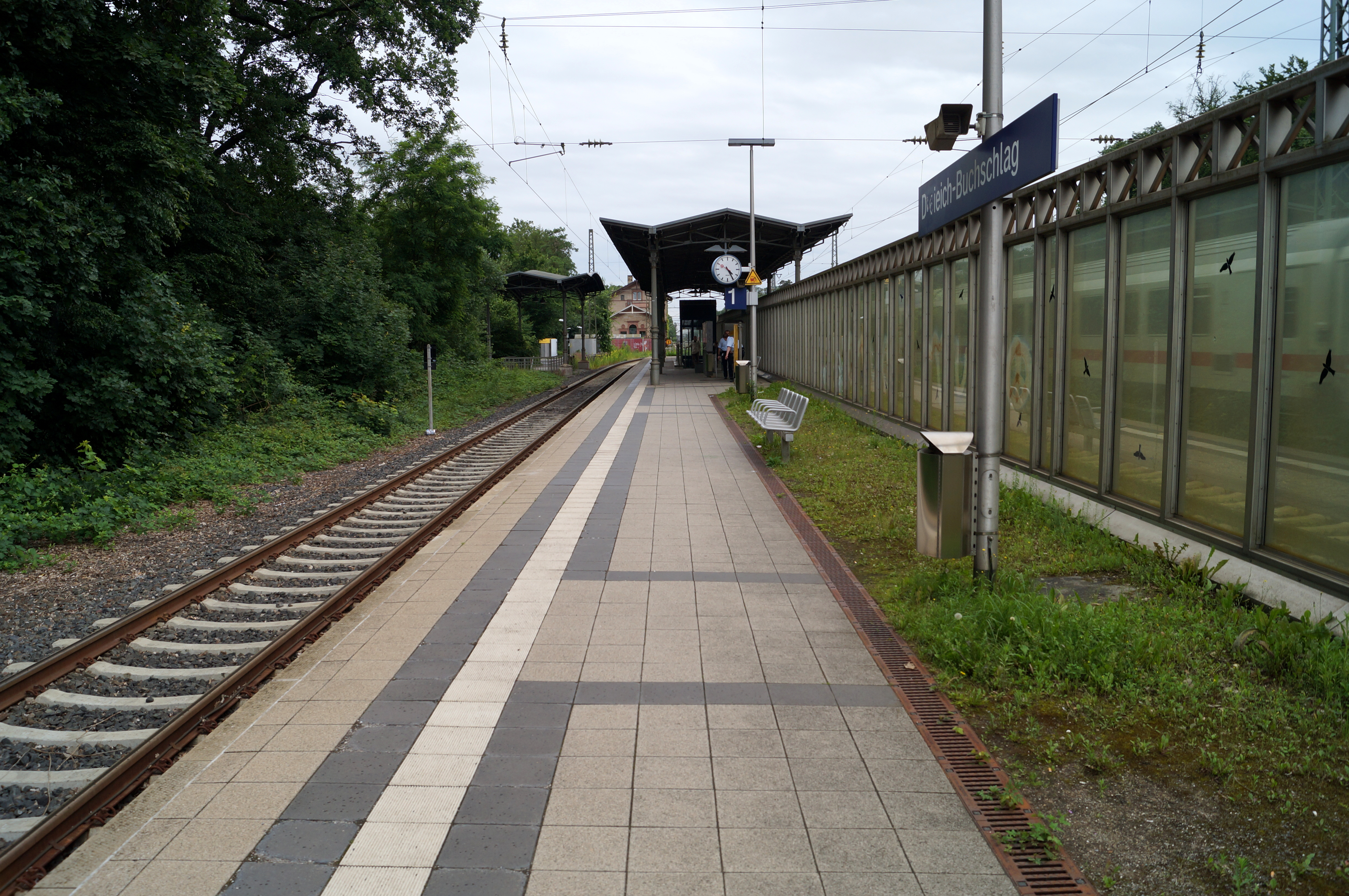
The platform of Dreieich-Buchschlag station, from which the trains on the Dreieich Railway run. The historic platform canopy comes from the former Ludwigsbahnhof in Darmstadt.

A new timetable commenced on the Dreieich Railway on 16 July 2016. Regional trains run through to Frankfurt (Main) Hauptbahnhof hourly from Monday to Friday (RB 61). There are operated with Siemens Desiro Classic (class 642) and GTW 2/6 (class 646) diesel multiple units, which run from Frankfurt (Main) Hauptbahnhof via Buchschlag and Ober-Roden to Dieburg. Services run on the section between Ober-Roden and Buchschlag every 30 minutes on weekdays. There are connections to the Rhine-Main S-Bahn in Dreieich-Buchschlag and Rödermark-Ober Roden.

The only remaining siding is that of the RWE between Urberach and Offenthal. If necessary, a transformer is switched on or off to allow operations. These trains operated were formerly usually hauled by a class 225 diesel locomotive. These trains go from Dieburg over the Dreieich Railway.

== Prospects ==
The line is contracted to be operated from 30 June 2016 until the timetable change in 2027 with new Pesa Link sets. Due to delays in the delivery of the Pesa Link sets, class 642 and 646 sets are being used temporarily.

The towns Rödermark and Dreieich have demanded the electrification of the Dreieich Railway and the extension of S-Bahn services over it.

Once the Regionaltangente West (Regional tangent west, RTW) is in service, it will also improve connections for passengers from the communities on the Dreieich Railway. It would create faster transfer connections by rail to Frankfurt Airport and towards Mainz and Wiesbaden. The plans provide for a branch to Dreieich-Buchschlag station.

== Stations ==
=== Dreieich-Sprendlingen ===
Dreieich-Sprendlingen station serves the suburb of Sprendlingen of the town of Dreieich. At the opening of the line in 1905, it originally had the name of Sprendlingen-Ort. (Note: The suffix "-Ort" (location) was used to distinguish the station from the station called Sprendlingen (Rheinhessen) and, from 1908, Sprendlingen-Buchschlag.) The entrance building station is listed for its cultural heritage under the Hessian heritage law.

=== Dreieich-Weibelfeld ===
Dreieich-Weibelfeld station serves the northern part of Dreieichenhain. It was not part of the line at its opening and was added later.

=== Dreieich-Dreieichenhain ===
Dreieich-Dreieichenhain station serves the southern part of Dreieichenhain. At its opening in 1905, it was called Dreieichenhain.

=== Dreieich-Götzenhain ===
Dreieich-Götzenhain station serves the suburb of Götzenhain in the town of Dreieich. At its opening in 1905, it was called Götzenhain. The entrance building is listed for its cultural heritage.

=== Dreieich-Offenthal ===
Dreieich-Offenthal station served the suburb Offenthal of the town of Dreieich. At its opening in 1905, it was called Offenthal. The entrance building is listed for its cultural heritage.

=== Rödermark-Urberach ===
Rödermark-Urberach station serves the suburb of Urberach of the town of Rödermark. At its opening in 1905, it was called Urberach. The entrance building is listed for its cultural heritage.
