= Dieburg station =

Railway station in Hesse, Germany

Dieburg
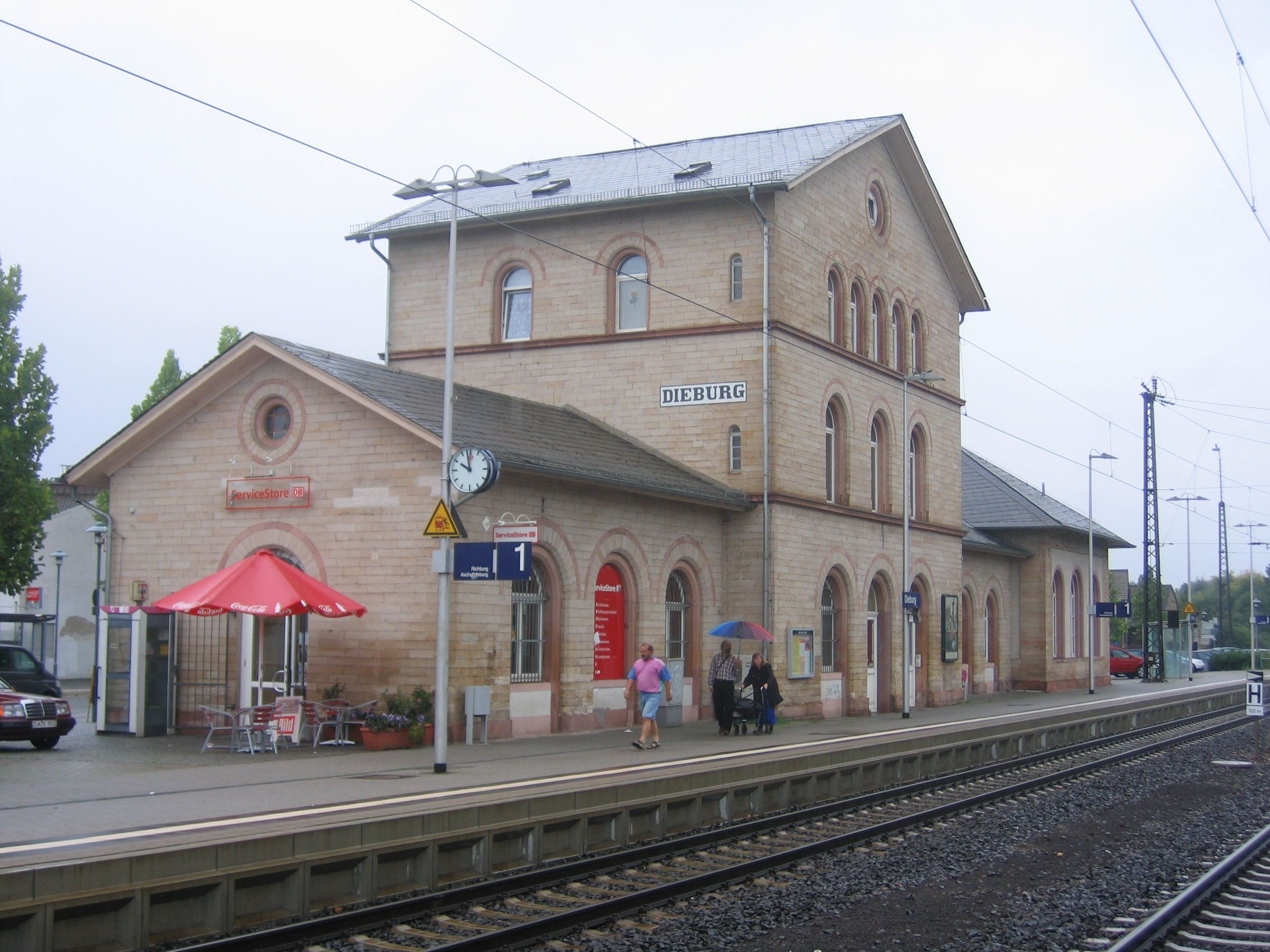

General information
- Location: Dieburg, Hesse; Germany
- Coordinates: 49°54′13″N 8°50′26″E
- Lines: Rhine-Main Railway (53.2 km) (KBS 651); Rodgau Railway (30.4 km) (KBS 645.1)
- Platforms: 5

Construction
- Accessible: Yes
- Architectural style: Neoclassical

Other information
- Station code: 1194
- DS100 code: FDI
- Category: 4
- Fare zone: : 4128
- Website: www.bahnhof.de

History
- Opened: 1 August 1858

Passengers
- 8,000

Services
Preceding station	DB Regio Mitte	Following station
Münster (b. Dieburg) towards Frankfurt (Main) Hbf	RB 61	Terminus
Messel towards Wiesbaden Hbf	RB 75	Altheim (Hess) towards Aschaffenburg Hbf
Location
- Location within Hesse

Dieburg station is located in the town of Dieburg in the German state of Hesse on the Rhine-Main Railway (German: Rhine-Main-Bahn), which runs from Mainz via Darmstadt to Aschaffenburg. The Rodgau Railway from Offenbach am Main now ends here. The station is classified by Deutsche Bahn as a category 4 station. It is served only by local trains.

== History ==
The Rhine-Main Railway was built by the Hessian Ludwig Railway (Hessische Ludwigsbahn) and became operational on 1 August 1858. The well-preserved station building was built in the style of romantic neoclassicism between 1861 and 1863. The round-arched windows are significant. The station building is listed as a monument under the Hessian Heritage Act.

The Rodgau Railway was opened on 30 October 1896. Its southern section from Dieburg to Groß-Zimmern and Reinheim was closed to passengers in 1965 and later dismantled. From 14 December 2003, the Rodgau Railway between Offenbach and Rödermark-Ober-Roden became part of the Rhine-Main S-Bahn, but the section between Ober-Roden and Dieburg was not included. As a result, the diesel multiple units running on the Dreieich Railway to Ober-Roden (usually from Dreieich-Buchschlag) now continue to and from Dieburg.

The station was modernised between 2000 and 2005 with the provision of barrier-free access for the disabled. In early 2009, work began on the elimination of the passenger level crossing and the construction of an underpass at Dieburg station.

== Infrastructure ==
Dieburg station has five platform tracks. Closest to the station building are tracks 1 and 2, the running lines of the Rhine-Main Railway. Track 3 can be used for passing. Track 4 and 5 are on the Rodgau Railway and begin to swing to the north in the platform area.

Between the two lines at the eastern end of the station there is a siding leading into the industrial area of Dieburg. The freight loading tracks east of the station building were dismantled as part of the construction of the new underpass. Not much can be seen of the former route to Reinheim today. A cycling path has been built on sections of the line.

== Operations ==
The station is served by Regionalbahn trains. It is served by 80 regional trains (two RB lines) and 40 buses (four routes) on each working day:

=== Rail ===
In 2025 the station was served by the following services:

Line	Route	Frequency
RB 61	Dreieichbahn; Dieburg – Rödermark-Ober Roden – Dreieich-Buchschlag (– Frankfurt (Main) Hbf)	Hourly
RB 75	Rhein-Main-Bahn; Wiesbaden Hbf – Mainz Hbf – Darmstadt Hbf – Dieburg – Babenhausen – Aschaffenburg Hbf	Hourly

Several freight trains pass through without stopping.

=== Bus ===
Line	Route	Frequency
671	Darmstadt Hauptbahnhof- Dieburg Schlossgarten – (Dieburg Bahnhof) – Groß-Umstadt Pfälzer Schloß	Departures at 4:36 am and 5:06 am (only Monday till Friday)
672	Dieburg Bahnhof – Roßdorf – Darmstadt Hbf	Hourly (All week trough)
679	Reinheim Bahnhof – Dieburg Bahnhof – Rödermark Ober-Roden Bahnhof	every 30 min (Workdays) every 2 hours (weekends and holidays)
GU2	Dieburg Bahnhof – Semd – Groß-Umstadt – Dorndiel – Mömlingen Gh. z. schönen Aussicht	Hourly (Workdays) every 2 hours (weekends and holidays)
MD	Dieburg Bahnhof – Dieburg Dammweg – Münster Hallenbad – Münster Schule auf der Aue	Hourly (Workdays)

Issue: December 2024
