= Pfizer–BioNTech COVID-19 vaccine =

Type of vaccine for humans

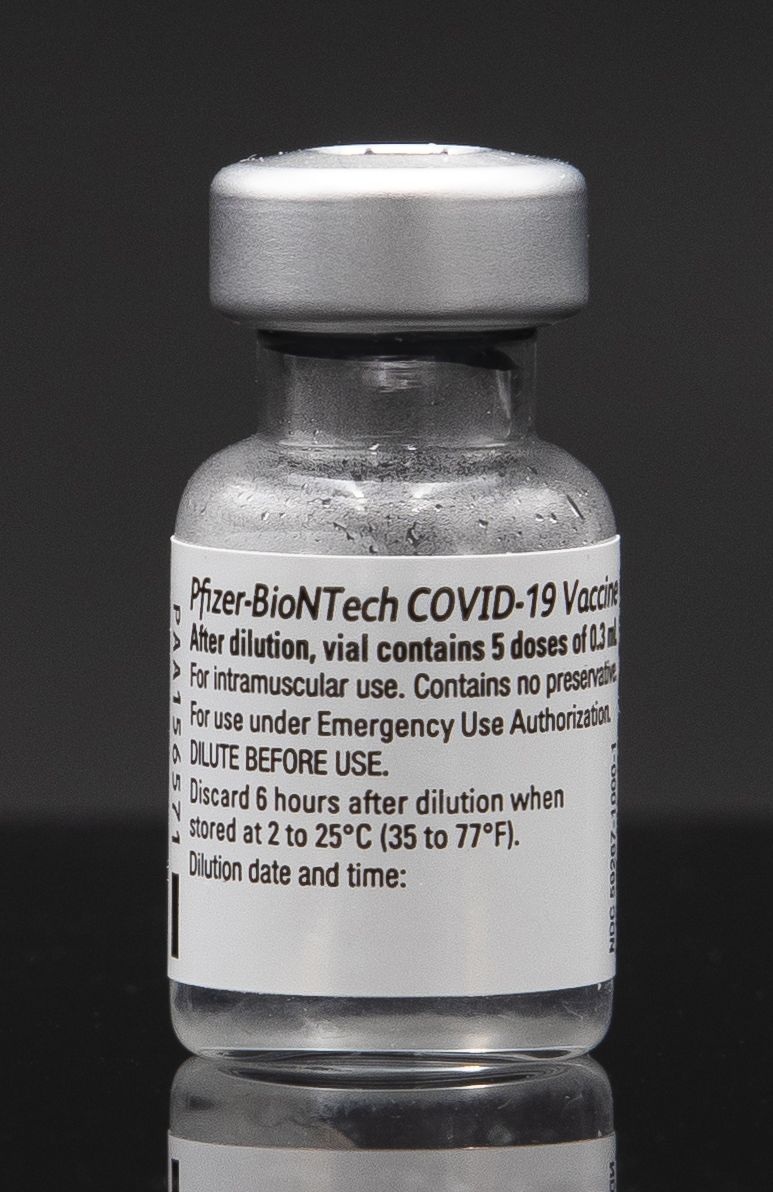
- A vial of the Pfizer–BioNTech COVID‑19 vaccine for the U.S. market

Vaccine description
- Target: SARS-CoV-2
- Vaccine type: mRNA

Clinical data
- Trade names: Comirnaty
- Other names: BNT162b2, COVID-19 mRNA vaccine (nucleoside-modified), COVID-19 Vaccine (mRNA)
- AHFS/Drugs.com: Monograph
- MedlinePlus: a621003
- License data: EU EMA: by INN; US DailyMed: Pfizer-BioNTech COVID-19 vaccine
- Pregnancy category: AU: B1
- Routes of administration: Intramuscular
- ATC code: J07BN01 (WHO)

Legal status
- Legal status: AU: S4 (Prescription only); BR: Approved; CA: ℞-only / Schedule D; UK: Conditional marketing authorization granted; US: ℞-only; EU: Marketing authorization granted; CH: Rx-onlyZA: Section 21; Full list of Pfizer-BioNTech vaccine authorizations

Identifiers
- CAS Number: 2417899-77-3
- PubChem SID: 434370509
- DrugBank: DB15696
- UNII: 5085ZFP6SJ
- KEGG: D11971
- ChEMBL: ChEMBL4650429

The Pfizer–BioNTech COVID-19 vaccine, sold under the brand name Comirnaty, is an mRNA-based COVID-19 vaccine developed by the German biotechnology company BioNTech. For its development, BioNTech collaborated with the American company Pfizer to carry out clinical trials, logistics, and manufacturing. It is authorized for use in humans to provide protection against COVID-19, caused by infection with the SARS-CoV-2 virus. The vaccine is given by intramuscular injection. It is composed of nucleoside-modified mRNA (modRNA) that encodes a mutated form of the full-length spike protein of SARS-CoV-2, which is encapsulated in lipid nanoparticles. Initial guidance recommended a two-dose regimen, given 21 days apart; this interval was subsequently extended to up to 42 days in the United States, and up to four months in Canada.

Clinical trials began in April 2020; by November 2020, the vaccine had met the primary efficacy goals of the phase III clinical trial, with over 40,000 people participating. Interim analysis of study data showed a potential efficacy of 91.3% in preventing symptomatic infection within seven days of a second dose and no serious safety concerns. Most side effects are mild to moderate in severity and resolve within a few days. Common side effects include mild to moderate pain at the injection site, fatigue, and headaches. Reports of serious side effects, such as allergic reactions, remain very rare (Note: According to the British National Formulary and MedDRA conventions, side effects are "very common" when they occur in more than 1 in 10 instances; "common", 1 in 100 to 1 in 10; "uncommon", 1 in 1,000 to 1 in 100; "rare", 1 in 10,000 to 1 in 1,000; and "very rare" when they occur in less than 1 in 10,000 instances.) with no long-term complications documented.

The vaccine is the first COVID‑19 vaccine to be authorized by a stringent regulatory authority for emergency use and the first to be approved for regular use. In December 2020, the United Kingdom was the first country to authorize its use on an emergency basis. It is authorized for use at some level in the majority of countries. On 23 August 2021, the Pfizer–BioNTech vaccine became the first COVID-19 vaccine to be approved in the US by the Food and Drug Administration (FDA). The logistics of distributing and storing the vaccine present significant challenges due to the requirement for its storage at extremely low temperatures.

In August 2022, a bivalent version of the vaccine (Pfizer-BioNTech COVID-19 Vaccine, Bivalent) was authorized for use as a booster dose in individuals aged twelve and older in the US. The following month, the BA.1 version of the bivalent vaccine (Comirnaty Original/Omicron BA.1 or tozinameran/riltozinameran) was authorized as a booster for use in the UK. The same month, the European Union authorized both the BA.1 and the BA.4/BA.5 (tozinameran/famtozinameran) booster versions of the bivalent vaccine. In August 2024, the FDA approved and granted emergency authorization for a monovalent Omicron KP.2 version of the Pfizer–BioNTech COVID-19 vaccine. The approval of Comirnaty (COVID-19 Vaccine, mRNA) (2024-2025 Formula) was granted to BioNTech Manufacturing GmbH. The EUA amendment for the Pfizer-BioNTech COVID-19 Vaccine (2024-2025 Formula) was issued to Pfizer Inc. The emergency use authorization was revoked in August 2025.

== Medical uses ==
The Pfizer–BioNTech COVID-19 vaccine is used to provide protection against COVID-19, caused by infection with the SARS-CoV-2 virus, by eliciting an immune response to the S antigen. The vaccine is used to reduce morbidity and mortality from COVID-19.

The vaccine is supplied in a multidose vial as "a white to off-white, sterile, preservative-free, frozen suspension for intramuscular injection". It must be thawed to room temperature and diluted with normal saline before administration.

The initial course consists of two doses. The World Health Organization (WHO) recommends an interval of three to four weeks between doses. Delaying the second dose by up to twelve weeks increases immunogenicity, even in older adults, against all variants of concern. Authors of the Pitch study think that the optimal interval against the Delta variant is around eight weeks, with longer intervals leaving receptors vulnerable between doses.

A third, fourth, or fifth dose can be added in some countries.

=== Effectiveness ===
A test-negative (Note: This is a type of study where researchers recruit two groups: people who test positive for the disease (cases) and those who test negative (controls) (Vandenbroucke 2019). They then survey these individuals for factors which may have affected whether or not they developed the disease (in this case, vaccination status) (Patel 2020). In the case of Lopez Bernal et al, they also assessed which variant each "case" contracted (e.g. alpha [B.1.1.7] or delta [B.1.617.2]) using both RT-PCR testing and whole genome sequencing. To evaluate efficacy, the researchers determined how much less likely a person was to contract each variant based on their vaccination status. In this case, a person who received two doses of the Pfizer vaccine was 93.7% less likely to contract the alpha variant and 88.0% less likely to contract the delta variant, when compared to an unvaccinated person.: Vandenbroucke JP, Pearce N (November 2019). "Test-Negative Designs: Differences and Commonalities with Other Case-Control Studies with "Other Patient" Controls" (PDF). Epidemiology. 30 (6): 838–844. doi:10.1097/EDE.0000000000001088. PMID 31430265. S2CID 201117050. Archived (PDF) from the original on 21 September 2021.; Patel MM, Jackson ML, Ferdinands J (November 2020). "Postlicensure Evaluation of COVID-19 Vaccines". JAMA. 324 (19): 1939–40. doi:10.1001/jama.2020.19328. PMID 33064144. S2CID 222819843.) case-control study published in August 2021, found that two doses of the BNT162b2 (Pfizer) vaccine had 93.7% effectiveness against symptomatic disease caused by the alpha (B.1.1.7) variant and 88.0% effectiveness against symptomatic disease caused by the delta (B.1.617.2) variant. Notably, effectiveness after one dose of the Pfizer vaccine was 48.7% against alpha and 30.7% against delta, similar to effectiveness provided by one dose of the ChAdOx1 nCoV-19 vaccine.

In August 2021, the US Centers for Disease Control and Prevention (CDC) published a study reporting that the effectiveness against infection decreased from 91% (81–96%) to 66% (26–84%) when the Delta variant became predominant in the US, which may be due to unmeasured and residual confounding related to a decline in vaccine effectiveness over time.

Unless indicated otherwise, the following effectiveness ratings are indicative of clinical effectiveness two weeks after the second dose. A vaccine is generally considered effective if the estimate is ≥50% with a >30% lower limit of the 95% confidence interval. Effectiveness is generally expected to slowly decrease over time.

Initial effectiveness by variant
Doses	Severity of illness	Alpha	Beta	Gamma	Delta	Omicron	Others circulating previously (Note: Surveillance study from 20 December 2020 to 1 February 2021 in Israel. During this period, according to Nextstrain, the dominant variant in Israel was lineage B.1.1.50 and the Alpha variant was becoming dominant.)
1	Asymptomatic	38% (29–45%)	17% (10–23%)	Not reported	30% (17–41%)	Not reported	60% (53–66%)
1	Symptomatic	27% (13–39%)	43% (22–59%)		33% (15–47%)	Not reported	66% (57–73%)
1	Hospitalization	83% (62–93%) (Note: Preliminary data of effectiveness against hospitalization referenced by Public Health England.)	0% (0–19%)	56% (−9 to 82%)	94% (46–99%)	Not reported	78% (61–91%)
2	Asymptomatic	92% (90–93%)	75% (71–79%)	Not reported	79% (75–82%)	Not reported	92% (88–95%)
2	Symptomatic	92% (88–94%)	88% (61–96%)		83% (78–87%)	88% (66–96%) (Note: Effectiveness drops to 49% (24–65%) in weeks 10–14 after the second dose and then stabilizes at 34%–37% thereafter.)	94% (87–98%)
2	Hospitalization	95% (78–99%)	100% (74–100%)	100% (Note: A confidence interval was not provided, so it is not possible to know the accuracy of this measurement.)	96% (86–99%)	70% (62–76%)	87% (55–100%)
3 (Note: Booster dose.)	Symptomatic	Not reported	Not reported	Not reported	96% (89–99%) (Note: Efficacy data from a study with more than 10,000 participants.)	76% (56–86%) (Note: Effectiveness drops to about 45% 10 weeks after the booster dose.)	Not reported

In November 2021, Public Health England reported a possible but extremely small reduction in effectiveness against symptomatic disease from the Delta sublineage AY.4.2 at longer intervals after the second dose.

Preliminary data suggest that the effectiveness against the Omicron variant starts to decline in about 10 weeks, either after the initial two-dose regimen or after the booster dose. For other variants, the effectiveness of the initial doses starts to decline in about six months. A case-control study in Qatar from 1 January to 5 September 2021 found that effectiveness against infection peaked at 78% (95% CI, 76–79%) in the first month after the second dose, followed by a slow decline that accelerated after the fourth month, reaching 20% at months 5 to 7. A similar trajectory was observed against symptomatic disease and against specific variants. Effectiveness against severe disease, hospitalization and death was more robust, peaking at 96% (93–98%) in the second month and remaining almost stable through the sixth month, declining thereafter.

In October 2021, a phase III trial showed that a booster dose given approximately 11 months after the second dose restored the protective effect to the 96% (95% CI, 89–99%) efficacy level against symptomatic disease from the Delta variant.

In December 2021, Pfizer and BioNTech reported that preliminary data indicated that a third dose of the vaccine would provide a similar level of neutralizing antibodies against the Omicron variant as seen after two doses against other variants.

In December 2021, private health insurer Discovery Health, in collaboration with the South African Medical Research Council, reported that real-world data from more than 211,000 cases of COVID-19 in South Africa, of which 78,000 were of the Omicron variant, indicate that effectiveness against the variant after two doses is about 70% against hospital admission and 33% against symptomatic disease. Protection against hospital admission is maintained for all ages and groups with comorbidities.

A study of the bivalent booster effectiveness against severe COVID-19 outcomes in Finland, September 2022–January 2023, has shown that it reduced the risk of severe COVID-19 outcomes among the elderly. By contrast, among the chronically ill 18–64-year-olds the risk was similar among those who received bivalent vaccine and those who did not. Among the elderly a bivalent booster provided highest protection during the first two months after vaccination, but thereafter signs of waning were observed. The effectiveness among individuals aged 65–79 years and those aged 80 years or more was similar.

=== Specific populations ===
Based on the results of a preliminary study, the U.S. Centers for Disease Control and Prevention (CDC) recommends that pregnant women get vaccinated with the COVID‑19 vaccine.

A statement by the British Medicines and Healthcare products Regulatory Agency (MHRA) and the Commission on Human Medicines (CHM) reported that the two agencies had reached a conclusion that the vaccine is safe and effective in children aged between 12 and 15 years.

In May 2021, experts commissioned by the Norwegian Medicines Agency concluded that the Pfizer-BioNTech vaccine is the likely cause of ten deaths of frail elderly patients in Norwegian nursing homes. They said that people with very short life expectancies have little to gain from vaccination, having a real risk of adverse reactions in the last days of life and of dying earlier.

A 2021 report by the New South Wales Government (NSW Health) in Australia found that the Pfizer-BioNTech vaccine is safe for those with various forms of immunodeficiency or immunosuppression, though it does note that the data on said groups is limited, due to their exclusion from many of the vaccine earlier trials held in 2020. It notes that the World Health Organization advises that the vaccine is among the three COVID-19 vaccines (alongside that of Moderna and AstraZeneca) it deems safe to give to immunocompromised individuals, and that expert consensus generally recommends their vaccination. The report states that the vaccines were able to generate an immune response in those individuals, though it does also note that this response is weaker than in those that are not immunocompromised. It recommends that specific patient groups, such as those with cancer, inflammatory bowel disease and various liver diseases be prioritised in the vaccination schedules over other patients that do not have said conditions.

In September 2021, Pfizer announced that a clinical trial conducted in more than 2,200 children aged 5–11 has generated a "robust" response and is safe.

== Adverse effects ==
In Phase III trials for the vaccine, there were no safety concerns and few adverse events.

Most side effects of the Pfizer–BioNTech COVID‑19 vaccine are mild to moderate in severity, and are gone within a few days. They are similar to other adult vaccines and are normal signs that the body is building protection to the virus. During clinical trials, the common side effects affecting more than one in 10 people are (in order of frequency): pain and swelling at the injection site, tiredness, headache, muscle aches, chills, joint pain, fever or diarrhea. Fever is more common after the second dose.

The European Medicines Agency (EMA) regularly reviews the data on the vaccine's safety. The safety report published on 8 September 2021 by the EMA was based on over 392 million doses administered in the European Union. According to the EMA "the benefits of Comirnaty in preventing COVID‑19 continue to outweigh any risks, and there are no recommended changes regarding the use of this vaccine." Rare side effects (that may affect up to one in 1,000 people) include temporary one sided facial drooping and allergic reactions, such as hives or swelling of the face.

=== Allergy ===
Documented hypersensitivity to polyethylene glycol (PEG) (a very rare allergy) is listed as a contraindication to the COVID-19 Pfizer vaccine. Severe allergic reaction has been observed in approximately eleven cases per million doses of vaccine administered. According to a report by the US Centers for Disease Control and Prevention, 71% of those allergic reactions happened within 15 minutes of vaccination and mostly (81%) among people with a documented history of allergies or allergic reactions. The UK's Medicines and Healthcare products Regulatory Agency (MHRA) advised on 9 December 2020 that people who have a history of "significant" allergic reaction should not receive the Pfizer–BioNTech COVID‑19 vaccine. On 12 December, the Canadian regulator followed suit, noting that: "Both individuals in the U.K. had a history of severe allergic reactions and carried adrenaline auto injectors. They both were treated and have recovered."

=== Myocarditis ===
In June 2021, the Israel's Ministry of Health announced a probable relationship between the second dose and myocarditis in a small group of 16–30-year-old men. Between December 2020 and May 2021, there were 55 cases of myocarditis per 1 million people vaccinated, 95% of which were classified as mild and most spent no more than four days in the hospital. Since April 2021, increasing number of cases of myocarditis and pericarditis have been reported in the United States in about 13 per 1 million young people, mostly male and over the age of 16, after vaccination with the Pfizer–BioNTech or the Moderna vaccine. Most affected individuals recover quickly with adequate treatment and rest. Since February 2022, the German Standing Committee on Vaccination recommends aspiration for COVID-19 vaccination as precautionary measure.

== Pharmacology ==
The BioNTech technology for the BNT162b2 vaccine is based on use of nucleoside-modified mRNA (modRNA) which encodes a mutated form of the full-length spike protein found on the surface of the SARS-CoV-2 virus, triggering an immune response against infection by the virus protein.

=== Sequence ===
The modRNA sequence of the vaccine is 4,284 nucleotides long. It consists of a five-prime cap; a five prime untranslated region derived from the sequence of human alpha globin; a signal peptide (bases 55–102) and two proline substitutions (K986P and V987P, designated "2P") that cause the spike to adopt a prefusion-stabilized conformation reducing the membrane fusion ability, increasing expression and stimulating neutralizing antibodies; a codon-optimized gene of the full-length spike protein of SARS-CoV-2 (bases 103–3879); followed by a three prime untranslated region (bases 3880–4174) combined from AES and mtRNR1 selected for increased protein expression and mRNA stability and a poly(A) tail comprising 30 adenosine residues, a 10-nucleotide linker sequence, and 70 other adenosine residues (bases 4175–4284). The sequence contains no uridine residues; they are replaced by 1-methyl-3'-pseudouridylyl. The 2P proline substitutions in the spike proteins were originally developed for a Middle East respiratory syndrome (MERS) vaccine by researchers at the National Institute of Allergy and Infectious Diseases' Vaccine Research Center, Scripps Research, and Jason McLellan's team (at the University of Texas at Austin, previously at Dartmouth College).

== Chemistry ==
In addition to the mRNA molecule, the vaccine contains the following inactive ingredients (excipients):

- ALC-0315, ((4-hydroxybutyl)azanediyl)bis(hexane-6,1-diyl)bis(2-hexyldecanoate)
- ALC-0159, 2-[(polyethylene glycol)-2000]-N,N-ditetradecylacetamide
- 1,2-distearoyl-sn-glycero-3-phosphocholine (DSPC)
- cholesterol
- dibasic sodium phosphate dihydrate
- monobasic potassium phosphate
- potassium chloride
- sodium chloride
- sucrose
- water for injection

The first four of these are lipids. The lipids and modRNA together form nanoparticles that act not only as carriers to get the modRNA into the human cells, but also as adjuvants. ALC-0159 is a polyethylene glycol conjugate, i.e., a PEGylated lipid.

== Manufacturing ==
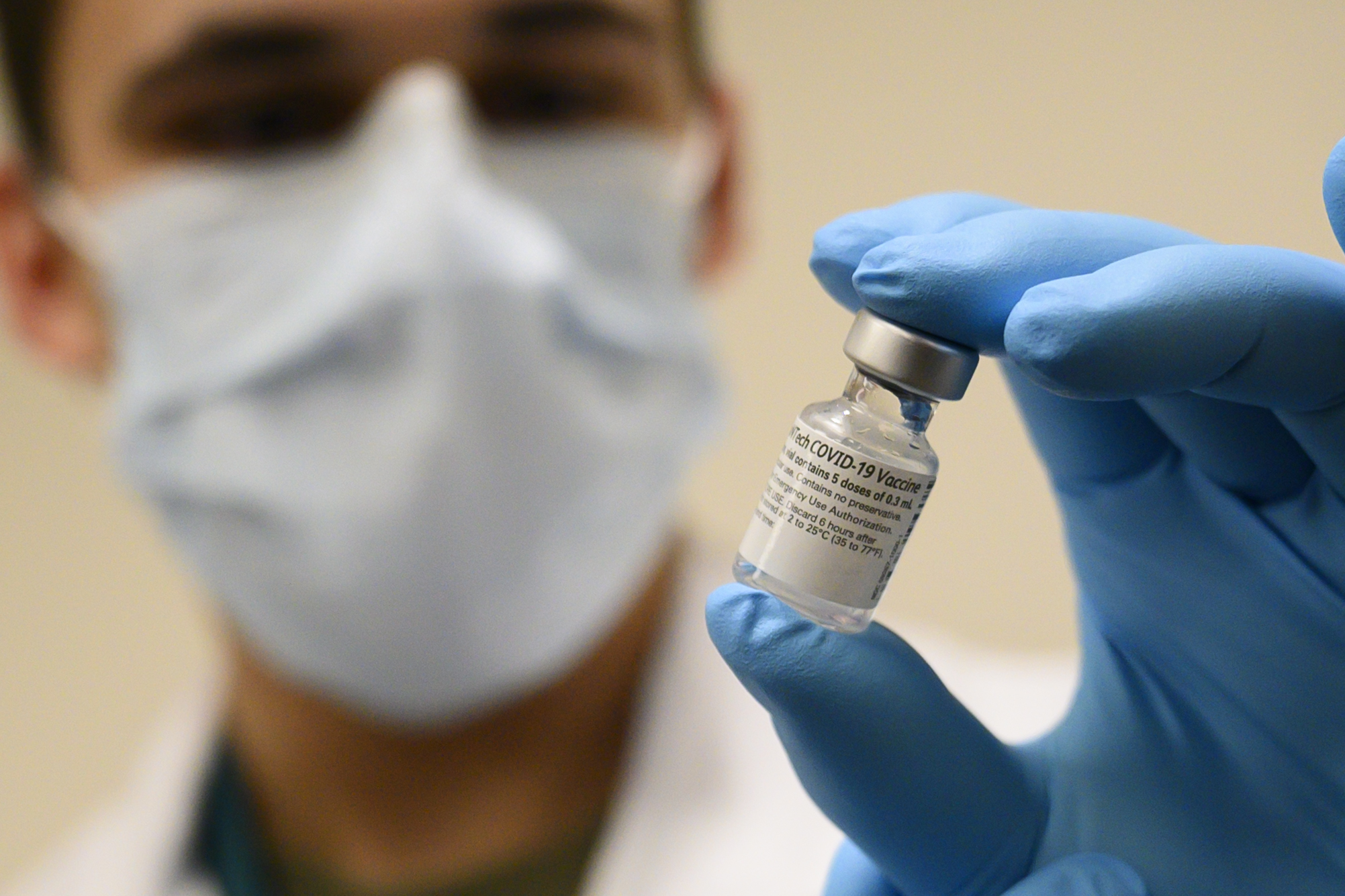
A US soldier holding the Pfizer–BioNTech vaccine

Pfizer and BioNTech are manufacturing the vaccine in their own facilities in the United States and in Europe. The license to distribute and manufacture the vaccine in China was purchased by Fosun, alongside its investment in BioNTech.

Manufacturing the vaccine requires a three-stage process. The first stage involves the molecular cloning of DNA plasmids that code for the spike protein by infusing them into Escherichia coli bacteria. For all markets, this stage is conducted in the United States, at a small Pfizer pilot plant in Chesterfield, Missouri (near St. Louis). After four days of growth, the bacteria are killed and broken open, and the contents of their cells are purified over a week and a half to recover the desired DNA product. The DNA is bottled and frozen for shipment. Safely and quickly transporting the DNA at this stage is so important that Pfizer has used its company jet and helicopter to assist.

The second stage is being conducted at a Pfizer plant in Andover, Massachusetts, in the United States, and at BioNTech's plants in Germany. The DNA is used as a template to build the desired mRNA strands, which takes about four days. Once the mRNA has been created and purified, it is frozen in plastic bags about the size of a large shopping bag, of which each can hold up to 10 million doses. The bags are placed on trucks which take them to the next plant.

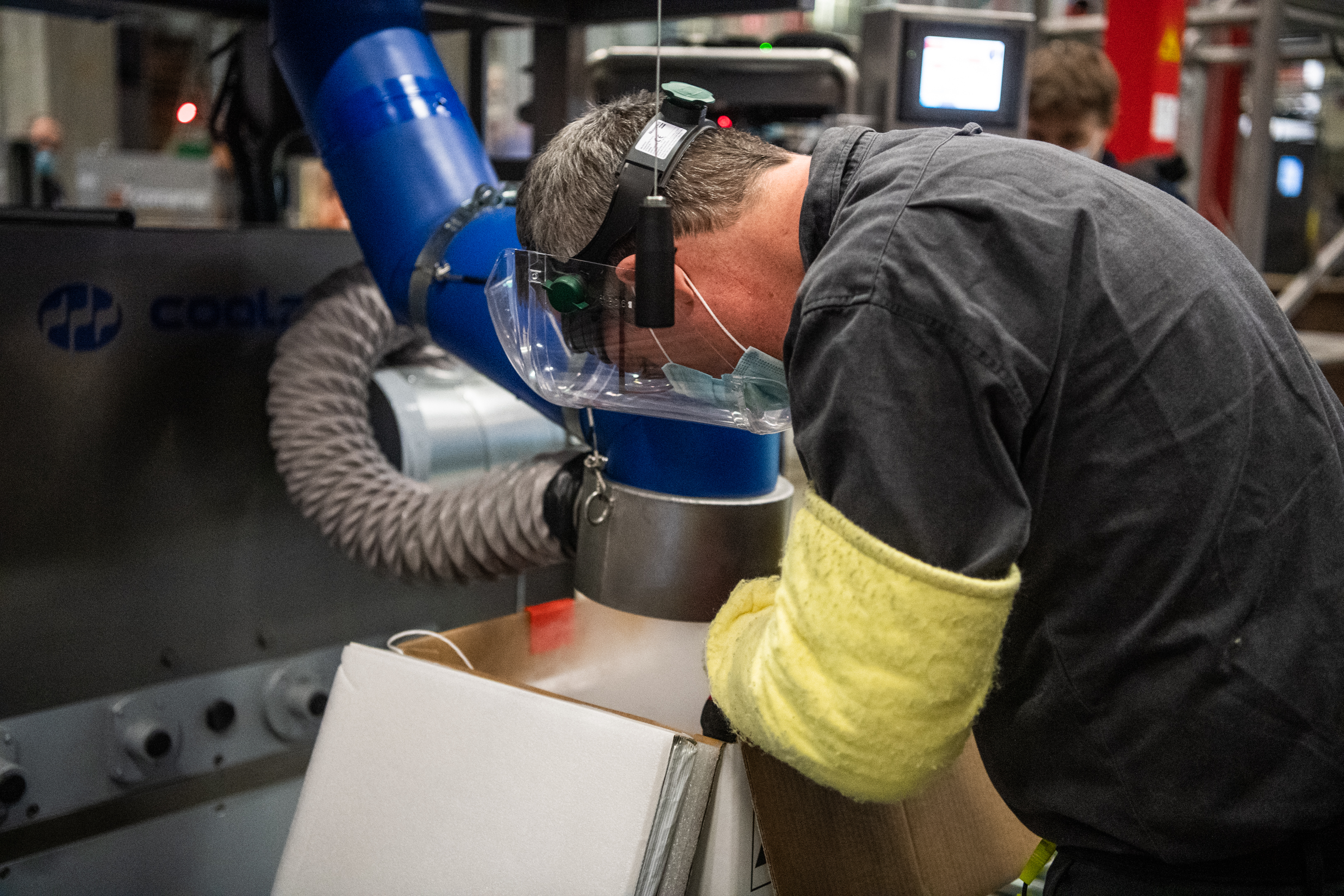
A Pfizer employee putting dry ice in a box to protect the COVID-19 vaccines during transport at the Puurs factory

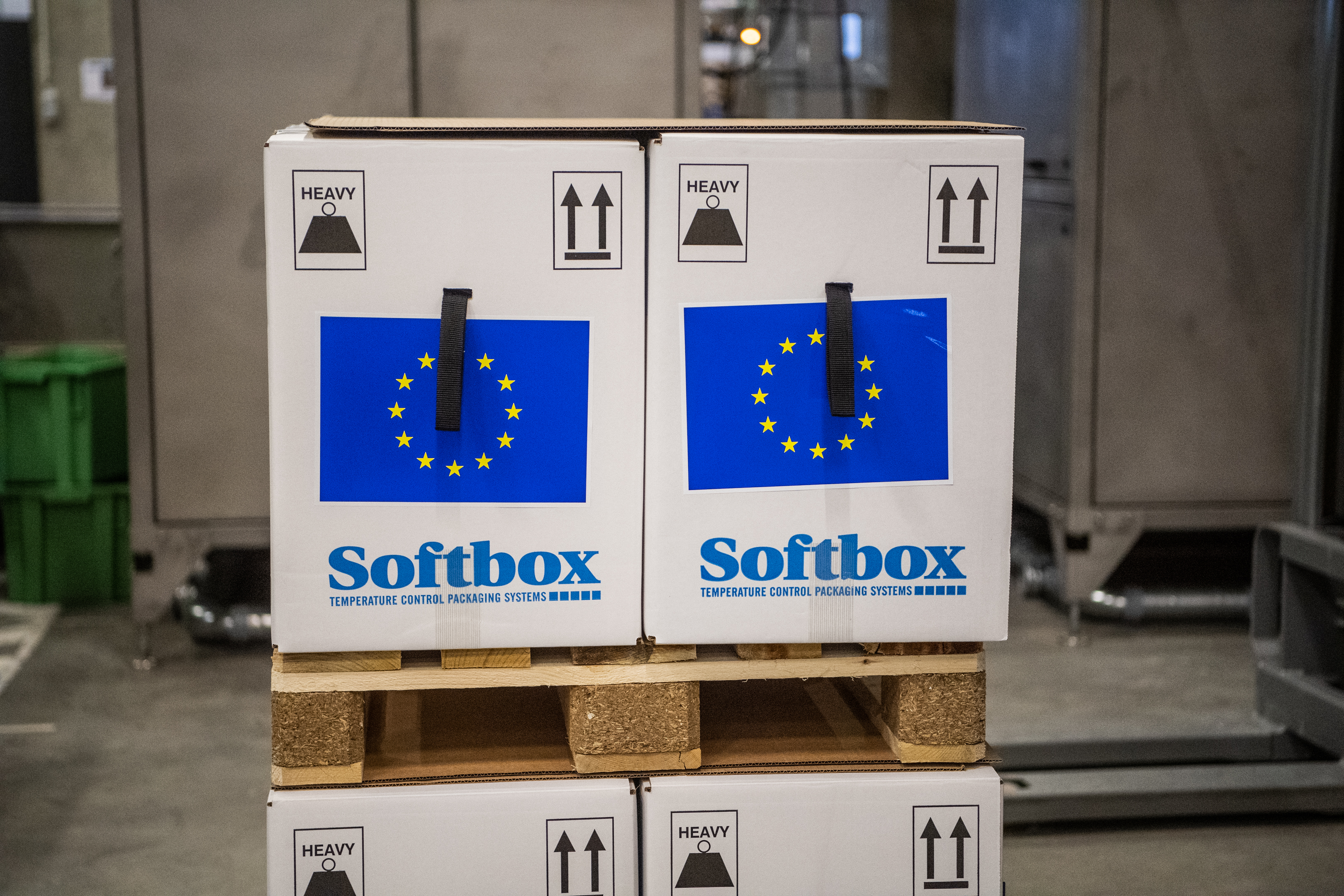
Boxes containing the COVID‑19 vaccines at the Pfizer factory in Puurs

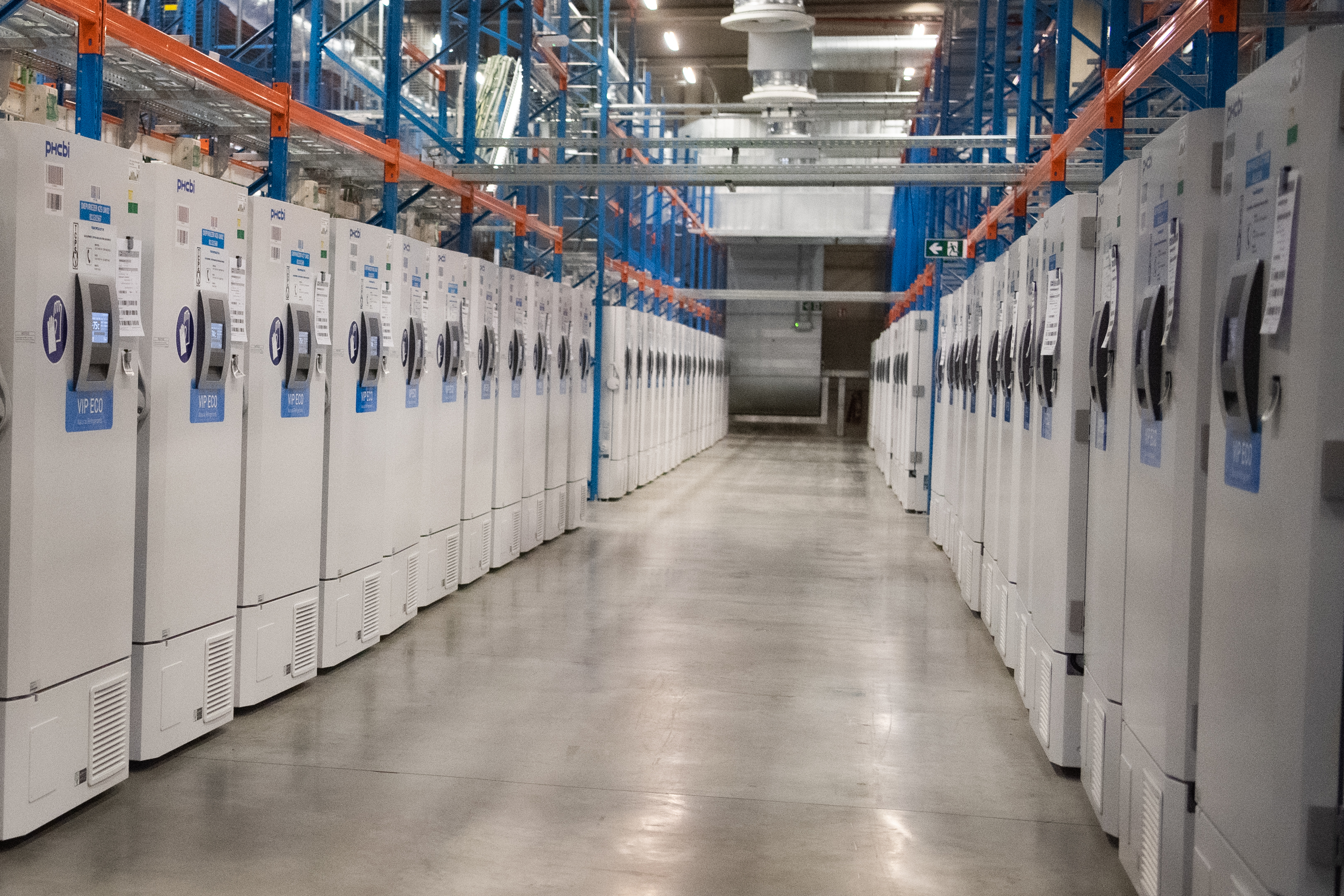
Inside view of Pfizer factory in Puurs

External videos
- Loading dock operations at Pfizer's Portage, Michigan facility, December 13, 2020, C-SPAN
- President Joe Biden and Michigan Gov. Gretchen Whitmer tour the Portage, Michigan Pfizer facility with Pfizer CEO Albert Bourla, February 19, 2021, C-SPAN

The third stage is being conducted at Pfizer plants in Portage, Michigan (near Kalamazoo) in the United States, and Puurs in Belgium. This stage involves combining the mRNA with lipid nanoparticles, then filling vials, boxing vials, and freezing them. Croda International subsidiary Avanti Polar Lipids is providing the requisite lipids. As of November 2020, the major bottleneck in the manufacturing process is combining mRNA with lipid nanoparticles. At this stage, it takes only four days to go from mRNA and lipids to finished vials, but each lot must then spend several weeks in deep-freeze storage while undergoing verification against 40 quality-control measures.

Before May 2021, the Pfizer plant in Puurs was responsible for all vials for destinations outside the United States. Therefore, all doses administered in the Americas outside of the United States before that point in time required at least two transatlantic flights (one to take DNA to Europe and one to bring back finished vaccine vials).

In February 2021, BioNTech announced it would increase production by more than 50% to manufacture 2 billion doses in 2021, raised again at the end of March to 2.5 billion doses in 2021.

In February 2021, Pfizer revealed that the entire sequence initially took about 110 days on average from start to finish, and that the company is making progress on reducing the time to 60 days. More than half the days in the production process are dedicated to rigorous testing and quality assurance at each of the three stages. Pfizer also revealed that the process requires 280 components and relies upon 25 suppliers located in 19 countries.

Vaccine manufacturers normally take several years to optimize the process of making a particular vaccine for speed and cost-effectiveness before attempting large-scale production. Due to the urgency presented by the COVID-19 pandemic, Pfizer and BioNTech began production immediately with the process by which the vaccine had been originally formulated in the laboratory, then started to identify ways to safely speed up and scale up that process.

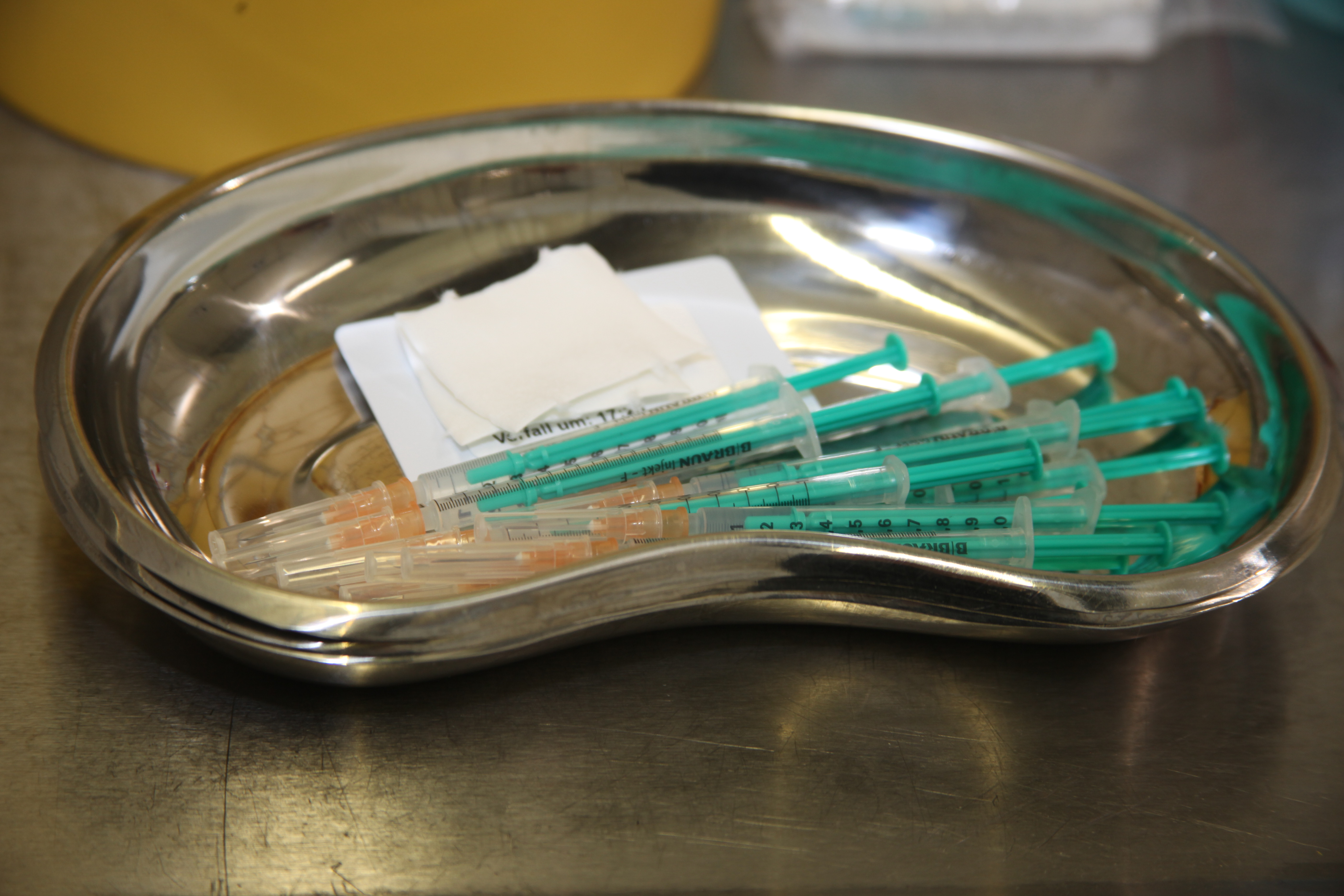
Syringes containing Pfizer COVID-19 vaccine doses

BioNTech announced in September 2020, that it had signed an agreement to acquire a manufacturing facility in Marburg, Germany, from Novartis to expand their vaccine production capacity. Once fully operational, the facility would produce up to 750 million doses per year, or more than 60 million doses per month. The site will be the third BioNTech facility in Europe that produces the vaccine, while Pfizer operates at least four production sites in the United States and Europe.

The Marburg facility had previously specialized in cancer immunotherapy for Novartis. By the end of March 2021, BioNTech had finished retrofitting the facility for mRNA vaccine production and retraining its 300 staff, and obtained approval to begin manufacturing. Besides making mRNA, the Marburg facility also performs the step of combining mRNA with lipids to form lipid nanoparticles, then ships the vaccine in bulk to other facilities for fill and finish (i.e., filling and boxing vials).

In April 2021, the EMA authorized an increase in batch size and associated process scale up at Pfizer's plant in Puurs. This increase is expected to have a significant impact on the supply of the vaccine in the European Union.

=== Logistics ===
The vaccine is delivered in vials that, once diluted, contain 2.25 mL of vaccine, comprising 0.45 mL frozen and 1.8 mL diluent. According to the vial labels, each vial contains five 0.3 mL doses, however excess vaccine may be used for one, or possibly two, additional doses. The use of low dead space syringes to obtain the additional doses is preferable, and partial doses within a vial should be discarded. The Italian Medicines Agency officially authorized the use of excess doses remaining within single vials. The Danish Health Authority allows mixing partial doses from two vials. As of 8 January 2021, each vial contains six doses. In the United States, vials will be counted as five doses when accompanied by regular syringes and as six doses when accompanied by low dead space syringes.

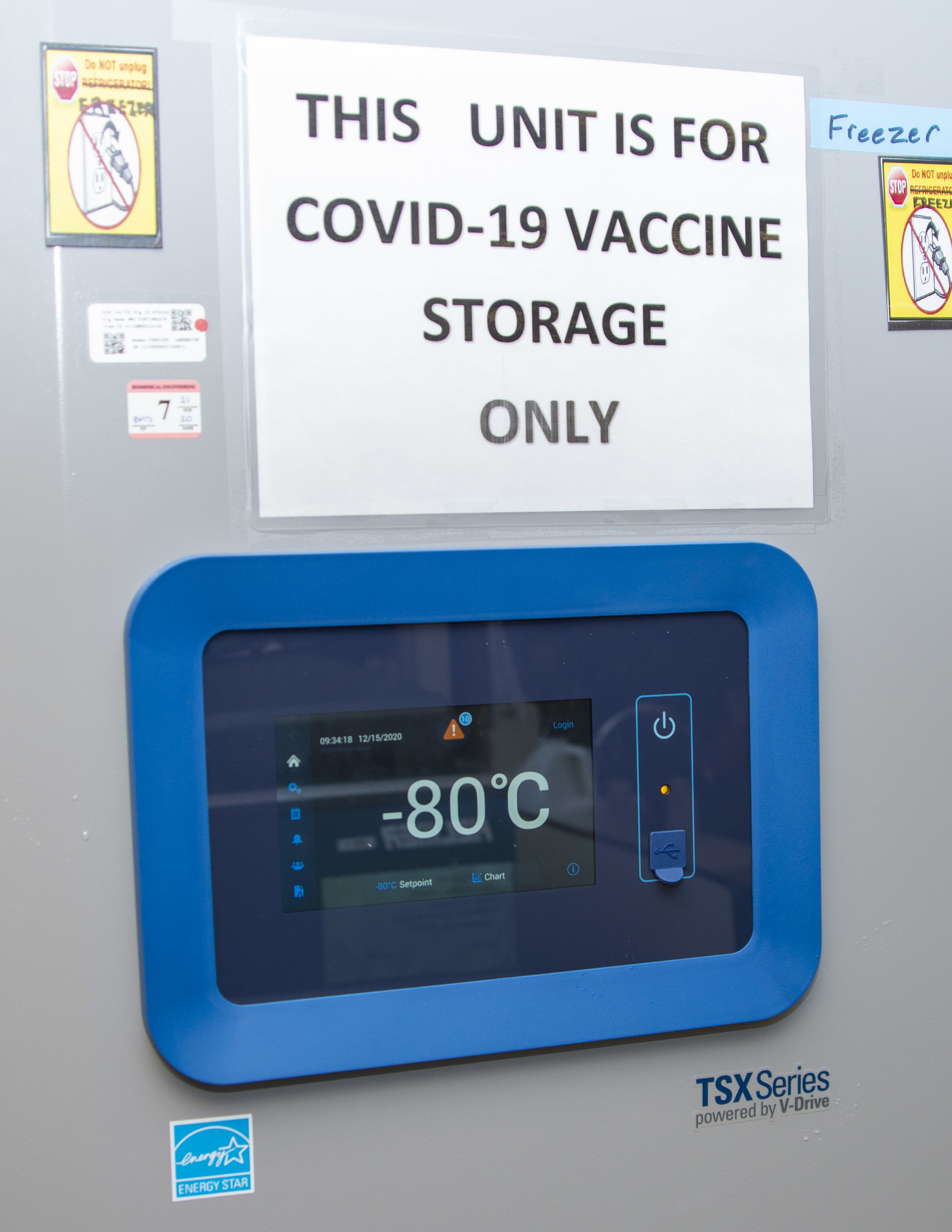
The Pfizer–BioNTech vaccine must be kept at extremely low temperatures to ensure effectiveness, roughly between −80 and −60 °C (−112 and −76 °F).

The vaccine can be stored at 2 to 8 °C (36 to 46 °F) for thirty days before use and at 25 °C (77 °F) or 30 °C (86 °F) for up to two hours before use. During distribution the vaccine is stored in special containers that maintain temperatures between −80 and −60 °C (−112 and −76 °F).

Low-income countries have limited cold chain capacity for ultracold transport and storage of a vaccine. The necessary storage temperatures for the vaccine are much lower than for the similar Moderna vaccine. The head of Indonesia's Bio Farma Honesti Basyir said purchasing the vaccine is out of the question for the world's fourth-most populous country, given that it did not have the necessary cold chain capability. Similarly, India's existing cold chain network can handle only temperatures between 2 and 8 °C (36 and 46 °F), far above the requirements of the vaccine.

== History ==
Before COVID‑19 vaccines, creating a vaccine for an infectious disease from scratch had never before been done in less than the five years it had taken in 1967 when Maurice Hilleman had set the modern record with a vaccine for mumps, followed by the vaccine for Ebola also taking five years. As of 2019 no vaccine existed for preventing a coronavirus infection in humans. The SARS-CoV-2 virus, which causes COVID‑19, was detected in December 2019.

The development of the Pfizer–BioNTech COVID‑19 vaccine began when BioNTech founder and CEO Uğur Şahin, at his home in Mainz on Friday, 24 January 2020, was checking out his regular websites when he noted a report in the science section of Der Spiegel website about a novel respiratory illness that had affected approximately 50 people in Wuhan. He then came across a submission from Hong Kong-based researchers on the website of the medical journal The Lancet in which they discussed a cluster of pneumonia associated with coronavirus and an indication of person-to-person transmission that had affected a family that had recently returned from Wuhan. The authors of the submission were of the opinion that they were observing the early stages of an epidemic.

While no infectious disease expert, Şahin did some quick calculations based on Wuhan's population and transport links and came to the conclusion that if this virus was capable of person-to-person transmission, then it could cause a mortality rate somewhere between 0.3 and 10 out of every 100 inflected people, to give a best case scenario of two million deaths worldwide. This would expose him, his family, and colleagues to danger. At the time, there were 1,000 internationally confirmed cases of the virus. Later that day he sent an email to Helmut Jeggle, chairman of BioNTech, to alert him of his conclusions. The next day he discussed it with his wife Özlem Türeci and his belief that once it reached Germany, local schools would be closed by April. During a telephone call with Jeggle that same day, he discussed the potential impact of such a virus. Şahin and Türeci had previously identified that the mRNA vaccine technology that the company had been developing offered the possibility of being used to create a suitable vaccine. While the company had a small team which had started developing vaccines for infectious disease and had been collaborating with Pfizer on a flu vaccine, BioNTech was, after 11 years of financial losses totalling more than €400 million, concentrating its efforts on developing mRNA as a means of fighting cancer.

However, realizing the risk and believing that the company's proprietary mRNA technology was now at the stage where they had the tools to create a vaccine, after discussing it with his wife, Şahin spent that weekend outlining the technical construction of eight possible vaccine candidates based on the company's mRNA platforms. He was assisted in his work by the SARS-CoV-2 genetic sequences previously published on 11 January 2020 by Edward C. Holmes in association with Zhang Yongzhen, a professor at the Chinese Center for Disease Control and Prevention on the open-source website Virological.org. This triggered an urgent international response to prepare for an outbreak and hasten development of preventive vaccines. Şahin had a series of meetings with the company's few infectious experts and the leaders of most of the departments to discuss his concerns about the virus and to announce his decision to establish a new project called 'Lightspeed' that would use all of the company's available resources to develop a vaccine. He also decided that rather than follow the traditional method of developing a single prototype and then discard it if it didn't work and then start again, they would develop and test multiple vaccines in parallel. They would then discard the least promising.

In June 2025, the European Medicines Agency announced that they are making data from the marketing authorization applications for COVID‑19 mRNA vaccines Comirnaty and Spikevax publicly available.

=== BioNTech approaches Pfizer about collaborating ===
At the board meeting the next day, Şahin received permission to spend a limited amount of money over the following weeks, allowing the company and its 1,300 personnel to investigate the development of a vaccine, after which they would reevaluate whether to continue. The board also considered whether to build up the capability to fully manufacture, document, sell, and distribute any potential vaccine, but decided this would take too long and that it would be better to partner with a pharmaceutical giant. Since the company had been collaborating with Pfizer since 2018 on developing an mRNA vaccine for influenza, Şahin called Pfizer's chief scientific officer, Phil Dormitzer, later that Tuesday to explain what they were doing and ask if Pfizer was interested in collaborating with BioNTech. Dormitzer was lukewarm, believing the new virus could be controlled and confined to China through public health measures, and a few hours later confirmed on behalf of Pfizer that they were not interested.

=== Consulting the Paul Ehrlich Institute ===
Prior to contacting Pfizer, Şahin had contacted Klaus Cichutek at the Paul Ehrlich Institute (PEI) in Langen, which was Germany's drug regulator, to ask for his assistance in arranging a meeting with a panel of experts to discuss a vaccine development strategy and to determine what needed to be done to receive authorisations to undertake a clinical trial. As it was taking the Wuhan developments very seriously, PEI was more than willing to help, had already initiated a vaccine development programme, and was providing emergency advice to other drug makers and waiving its administration fees. it was more than willing to assist BioNTech and came back two days later to say that, provided a detailed briefing dossier could be delivered in time, would meet with them the next week.

Corinna Rosenbaum, who was the lead project manager on the BioNTech flu project, was asked to prepare what eventually was a 50-page dossier detailing how the company had the expertise and technology to create a safe vaccine. Crucial to the delivery of an mRNA vaccine to its cellular destination via an injection into human muscle was the availability of a suitable wrapper made of lipid nano particles to protect it from the body's enzymes. Having no experience with them, the company approached Acuitas Therapeutics, whose proprietary wrapper technology was already being used in human trials and for which all of the necessary safety data was available. This would assist in gaining PEI approval. This small Canadian company of 25 staff was led by Tom Madden. An advantage of using Acuitas Therapeutics was that their ALC-0315 lipid formulation was already available at Polymun, which was one of the only companies that had the expertise immediately to combine lipids with mRNA. Polymun was located near Vienna in Austria, an eight-hour drive from BioNTech's headquarters, which would make it easier for material to be transported between the two companies. On Monday, 3 February, Acuitas Therapeutics agreed to assist. With Acuitas Therapeutics on board, the briefing dossier was able to be completed and sent to PEI late on Tuesday, 4 February, six days after work had commenced on compiling it.

On 6 February, Şahin, Türeci, and Rosenbaum, together with Tom Madden and Chris Barbosa from Acuitas Therapeutics, met with PEI, who were happy with what BioNTech proposed, with the only point of contention being that PEI rejected BioNTech's proposal either to skip toxicology studies altogether or to run them in parallel with clinical trials before human trials could begin. This was important as while the individual components had been shown by trials not to cause any significant issues in humans, there was no safety data on the combination of mRNA and lipids. Toxicology studies on mice or rats normally took five months. At this point in time, PEI's main concerns were about whether there were any benefits in speeding up the normal process. For the vaccine to work, it needed to deliver a stable, accurate replica of the virus's spike protein so that the body's immune system could recognize and react to COVID‑19 after infection. In developing a stable replica, the team was assisted by advice from Barney S. Graham, who had been studying the MERS virus, the genetic code of which was approximately 54% identical to that uploaded from COVID-19.

There were two options. One was to reproduce a full likeness of the entire spike protein which would contain approximately 1,200 amino acids (protein building blocks), increasing the risk of antibody-dependent enhancement (ADE) complications. The other was to reproduce only the tip of the spike protein, known as a receptor-binding domain (RBD). The RDB was simpler, containing approximately 200 amino acids, reducing the risk of ADE. Şahin decided that BioNTech would explore both methods.

=== Development of parallel candidates ===
BioNTech decided to develop simultaneously, in their laboratory in Mainz, 20 possible COVID‑19 vaccine permutations in different doses based on all four versions of synthetic mRNA platforms that they had developed, modified mRNA (modRNA), uridine RNA (uRNA), self-amplifying mRNA (saRNA), and trans-amplifying mRNA (taRNA).

Using the genetic sequences that were available on Virological.org, a team at BioNTech led by Stephanie Hein used gene synthesis to create DNA hardcopies, which were to be used to create the templates to make the mRNA. These hardcopies each contained up to 4,000 nucleotides, which were assembled from 50 to 80 smaller building blocks. Once these DNA templates were produced, another team created the actual mRNA vaccine candidates, the first batch of which was produced on 2 March. This was then poured into a 50 ml bag, frozen to minus 70 degrees Celsius, and dispatched by a waiting car to Polymun to be combined with the lipids, a process that was to followed by the rest of the 20 candidates.

Once the first vials containing the lipid-wrapped mRNA candidates were revived back in Mainz on 9 March, a team led by Annette Vogel began testing them to determine which, using various dosage amounts, induced the best immune responses, first in glass dishes and then, at a separate location, in mice. Each of the candidates was tested in three dosages, low, medium, and high, with each given to eight mice, with their blood then sampled and analyzed over the next six weeks. The blood was analyzed by a team led by Lena Kranz and Mathias Vormehr to check to see whether the mice's T-cells reacted and carried out the required immune response. These tests showed that all 20 candidates produced an immune response in the mice. In parallel Annette Vogel was also using enzyme-linked immunosorbent assays (ELISA) to determine using a virus neutralisation test (VNT) whether the candidates were inducing sufficient neutralising antibodies. Because of the risk that COVID‑19 posed, this testing had to be done in a biosafety level three (BSL-3) laboratory, which BioNTech didn't have. Fortunately, they were able to get around this by creating a vesicular stomatitis virus (VSV) pseudovirus to replace the harmful elements with the isolated spike proteins from SARS-CoV-2. A working prototype pseudovirus test was ready by 10 March. This meant the laboratory security requirements could be downgraded to BSL-1, which the company had onsite.

To obtain a return on its investment in "Project Lightspeed Helmut," Jeggle was of the opinion that the company had to take advantage of the massive demand by being among the first three to the market with a vaccine. To do this BioNTech needed the evolvement of either GSK, Johnson & Johnston, Merck, Pfizer, or Sanofi, any of whom alone had the financial resources, manufacturing ability, and territorial coverage to undertake the massive Phase 3 trials needed to prove to the regulators that the vaccine was safe.

=== BioNTech reapproaches Pfizer about collaborating ===
Despite the earlier rebuff from Pfizer, the company still preferred to partner with them. In the meantime they were able to reach what was in effect a licensing agreement on 16 March with Shanghai-based Fosun. On 3 March Şahin was able to contact Kathrin Jansen, head of vaccine research and development at Pfizer, that BioNTech was of the opinion that mRNA was the best means of creating a COVID‑19 vaccine. She took the idea of a collaboration to Pfizer CEO Albert Bourla. While the two companies had been working together since 2018 on developing a mRNA vaccine for influenza, it was only now that their two chief executives became personally acquainted. After a few phone calls, Bourla agreed that Pfizer would work with BioNTech on the development of BioNTech's COVID-19 vaccine. Since "time was of the essence," Bourla proposed that they commence work immediately and sort out the legal formalities later. Pfizer's lawyers were aghast when they realized what was going on. Although there was no formal legal agreement in place, BioNTech transferred its know-how to Pfizer the next day. Bouria agreed on the 50:50 partnership that Şahin proposed with each company equally sharing costs and any potential profits. Because of BioNTech's limited financial resources, Pfizer agreed to fund BioNTech's cost, which was expected to be $190 million and would be paid back. As far as Bourla was concerned, COVID‑19 was so important that he had told his staff that they had an "open cheque".

On 13 March it was formally announced that BioNTech was collaborating with Pfizer, with a letter of intent being signed on 17 March. However, it wasn't until January 2021 that the formal commercial agreement between Pfizer and BioNTech for the COVID-19 vaccine was signed.

The release of news of the partnership brought BioNTech publicity that resulted in the company's receiving letters and telephone calls containing racists views and often death threats. Security was tightened, and board members were offered personal protection.

=== Funding ===
According to Pfizer, research and development for the vaccine cost close to US$1 billion.

BioNTech received a US$135 million investment from Fosun on 16 March, 2020, in exchange for 1.58 million shares in BioNTech and the future development and marketing rights of BNT162b2 in China and surrounding territories.

In April 2020, BioNTech signed a partnership with Pfizer and received $185 million, including an equity investment of approximately $113 million.

In June 2020, BioNTech received €100 million (US$119 million) in financing from the European Commission and European Investment Bank. The Bank's deal with BioNTech started early in the pandemic, when the Bank's staff reviewed its portfolio and came up with BioNTech as one of the companies capable of developing a COVID‑19 vaccine. The European Investment Bank had already signed a first transaction with BioNTech in 2019.

In September 2020, the German government granted BioNTech €375 million (US$445 million) for its COVID‑19 vaccine development program.

Pfizer CEO Albert Bourla said he decided against taking funding from the US government's Operation Warp Speed for the development of the vaccine "because I wanted to liberate our scientists [from] any bureaucracy that comes with having to give reports and agree how we are going to spend the money in parallel or together, etc." Pfizer did enter into an agreement with the US for the eventual distribution of the vaccine, as with other countries.

=== Clinical trials ===
Phase I–II Trials were started in Germany on 23 April 2020, and in the U.S. on 4 May 2020, with four vaccine candidates entering clinical testing. The vaccine candidate BNT162b2 was chosen as the most promising among three others with similar technology developed by BioNTech. Before choosing BNT162b2, BioNTech and Pfizer had conducted phase I trials on BNT162b1 in Germany and the United States, while Fosun performed a Phase I trial in China. In these Phase I studies, BNT162b2 was shown to have a better safety profile than the other three BioNTech candidates.

The Pivotal Phase II–III Trial with the lead vaccine candidate "BNT162b2" began in July. Preliminary results from Phase I–II clinical trials on BNT162b2, published in October 2020, indicated potential for its safety and efficacy. During the same month, the European Medicines Agency (EMA) began a periodic review of BNT162b2.

The study of BNT162b2 is a continuous-phase trial in phase III as of November 2020. It is a "randomized, placebo-controlled, observer-blind, dose-finding, vaccine candidate-selection, and efficacy study in healthy individuals". The study expanded during mid-2020 to assess efficacy and safety of BNT162b2 in greater numbers of participants, reaching tens of thousands of people receiving test vaccinations in multiple countries in collaboration with Pfizer and Fosun.

The phase III trial assesses the safety, efficacy, tolerability, and immunogenicity of BNT162b2 at a mid-dose level (two injections separated by 21 days) in three age groups: 12–15 years, 16–55 years or above 55 years. The Phase III results indicating a 95% efficacy of the developed vaccine were published on 18 November 2020. For approval in the EU, an overall vaccine efficacy of 95% was confirmed by the EMA. The EMA clarified that the second dose should be administered three weeks after the first dose.

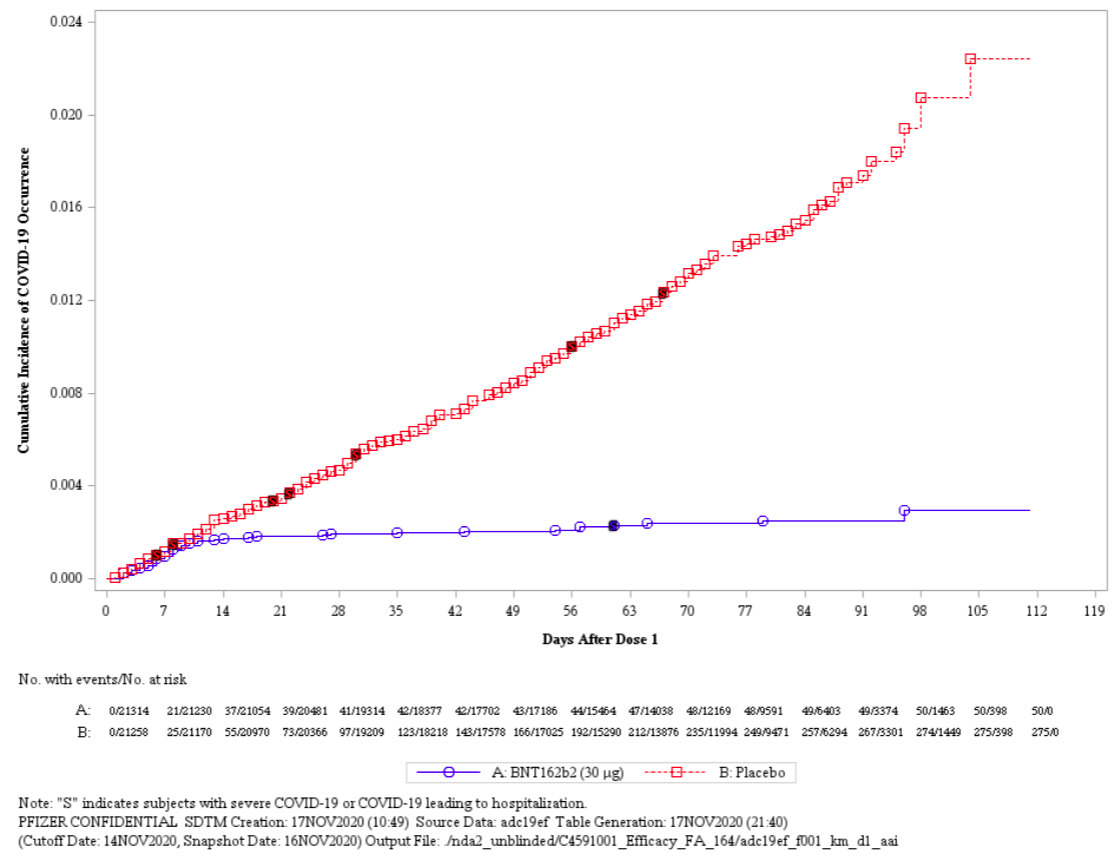
Cumulative incidence curves for symptomatic COVID‑19 infections after the first dose of the Pfizer–BioNTech vaccine (tozinameran) or placebo in a double-blind clinical trial (red: placebo; blue: tozinameran)

At 14 days after dose 1, the cumulative incidence begins to diverge between the vaccinated group and the placebo group. The highest concentration of neutralizing antibodies is reached 7 days after dose 2 in younger adults and 14 days after dose 2 in older adults.

Vaccine efficacy against confirmed symptomatic COVID‑19
Endpoint subgroup	Efficacy (95% confidence interval)
All ages	95.0% (90.0–97.9%)
Age 12–17	Not estimable (Note: No cases in the placebo group results in division by zero.)
Age 18–64	95.1% (89.6–98.1%)
Age 65–74	92.9% (53.1–99.8%)
Age ≥75	100.0% (−13.1 to 100.0%)
All ages, after dose 1, before dose 2	52.4% (29.5–68.4%)
All ages, ≥10 days after dose 1, before dose 2	86.7% (68.6–95.4%)
All ages, <7 days after dose 2	90.5% (61.0–98.9%)
All ages, ≥7 days after dose 2	94.8% (89.8–97.6%)
All ages, USA	94.9% (88.6–98.2%)
All ages, Argentina	97.2% (83.3–99.9%)
All ages, Brazil	87.7% (8.1–99.7%)

The ongoing phase III trial, which is scheduled to run from 2020 to 2022, is designed to assess the ability of BNT162b2 to prevent severe infection, as well as the duration of immune effect.

High antibody activity persists for at least three months after the second dose, with an estimated antibody half-life of 55 days. From these data, one study suggested that antibodies might remain detectable for around 554 days.

==== Specific populations ====
Pfizer and BioNTech started a Phase II–III randomized control trial in healthy pregnant women 18 years of age and older (NCT04754594). The study will evaluate 30 mcg of BNT162b2 or placebo administered via intramuscular injection in two doses, 21 days apart. The Phase II portion of the study will include approximately 350 pregnant women randomized 1:1 to receive BNT162b2 or placebo at 27 to 34 weeks' gestation. The Phase III portion of this study will assess the safety, tolerability, and immunogenicity of BNT162b2 or placebo among pregnant women enrolled at 24 to 34 weeks' gestation. Pfizer and BioNTech announced on 18 February 2021 that the first participants received their first dose in this trial.

A study published in March 2021, in the American Journal of Obstetrics and Gynecology came to the conclusion that messenger RNA vaccines against the novel coronavirus, such as the Pfizer-BioNTech and Moderna vaccines were safe and effective at providing immunity against infection to pregnant and breastfeeding mothers. Furthermore, they found that naturally occurring antibodies created by the mother's immune system were passed on to their children via the placenta and/or breastmilk, thus resulting in passive immunity among the child, effectively giving the child protection against the disease. The study also found that vaccine-induced immunity among the study's participants was stronger in a statistically significant way over immunity gained through recovery from a natural COVID‑19 infection. In addition, the study reported that the occurrence and intensity of potential side effects in those undergoing pregnancy or lactating was very similar to those expected from non-pregnant populations, remaining generally very minor and well tolerated, mostly including injection site soreness, minor headaches, muscles aches or fatigue for a short period of time.

In January 2021, Pfizer said it had finished enrolling 2,259 children aged between 12 and 15 years to study the vaccine's safety and efficacy. On 31 March 2021, Pfizer and BioNTech announced from initial Phase III trial data that the vaccine is 100% effective for those aged 12 to 15 years of age, with trials for those younger still in progress.

A research letter published in JAMA reported that the vaccines appeared to be safe for immunosuppressed organ transplant recipients, but that the resulting antibody response was considerably poorer than in the non-immunocompromised population after only one dose. The paper admitted the limitation of only reviewing the data following the first dose of a two-dose cycle vaccine.

In November 2021, journalist Paul D. Thacker alleged there has been "poor practice" at Ventavia, one of the companies involved in the phase III evaluation trials of the Pfizer vaccine. The report was enthusiastically embraced by anti-vaccination activists. David Gorski commented that Thacker's article presented facts without necessary context to misleading effect, playing up the seriousness of the noted problems.

=== Authorizations ===
Although jointly developed with Pfizer, Comirnaty is based on BioNTech's proprietary mRNA technology, and BioNTech holds the Marketing Authorization in the United States, the European Union, the UK, and Canada; expedited licenses such as the US emergency use authorization (EUA) are held jointly with Pfizer in many countries.

==== Expedited ====
The United Kingdom's Medicines and Healthcare products Regulatory Agency (MHRA) gave the vaccine "rapid temporary regulatory approval to address significant public health issues such as a pandemic" on 2 December 2020, which it is permitted to do under the Medicines Act 1968. It is the first COVID‑19 vaccine to be approved for national use after undergoing large scale trials, and the first mRNA vaccine to be authorized for use in humans. The United Kingdom thus became the first Western country to approve a COVID‑19 vaccine for national use, although the decision to fast-track the vaccine was criticized by some experts.

After the United Kingdom, the following countries and regions expedited processes to approve the Pfizer–BioNTech COVID‑19 vaccine for use: Argentina, Australia, Bahrain, Canada, Chile, Costa Rica, Ecuador, Hong Kong, Iraq, Israel, Jordan, Kuwait, Malaysia, Mexico, Oman, Panama, the Philippines, Qatar, Saudi Arabia, Singapore, South Korea, the United Arab Emirates, the United States, and Vietnam.

The World Health Organization (WHO) authorized it for emergency use.

In the United States, an emergency use authorization (EUA) is "a mechanism to facilitate the availability and use of medical countermeasures, including vaccines, during public health emergencies, such as the current COVID-19 pandemic", according to the Food and Drug Administration (FDA). Pfizer applied for an EUA on 20 November 2020, and the FDA approved the application three weeks later on 11 December 2020. The US Centers for Disease Control and Prevention (CDC) Advisory Committee on Immunization Practices (ACIP) approved recommendations for vaccination of those aged sixteen years or older. Following the EUA issuance, BioNTech and Pfizer continued the Phase III clinical trial to finalize safety and efficacy data, leading to application for licensure (approval) of the vaccine in the United States. On 10 May 2021, the US FDA also authorized the vaccine for people aged 12 to 15 under an expanded EUA. The FDA recommendation was endorsed by the ACIP and adopted by the CDC on 12 May 2021. In October 2021, the EUA was expanded to include children aged 5 through 11 years of age. In June 2022, the EUA was expanded to include children aged six months through four years of age.

In February 2021, the South African Health Products Regulatory Authority (SAHPRA) in South Africa issued Section 21, Emergency Use Approval for the vaccine.

In May 2021, Health Canada authorized the vaccine for people aged 12 to 15. On 18 May 2021, Singapore's Health Sciences Authority authorized the vaccine for people aged 12 to 15. The European Medicines Agency (EMA) followed suit on 28 May 2021.

In June 2021, the UK Medicines and Healthcare products Regulatory Agency (MHRA) came to a similar decision and approved the use of the vaccine for people twelve years of age and older.

==== Standard ====
In December 2020, the Swiss Agency for Therapeutic Products (Swissmedic) granted temporary authorization for the Pfizer–BioNTech COVID‑19 vaccine for regular use, two months after receiving the application, saying the vaccine fully complied with the requirements of safety, efficacy and quality. This is the first authorization under a standard procedure.

In December 2020, the Committee for Medicinal Products for Human Use (CHMP) of the European Medicines Agency (EMA) recommended granting conditional marketing authorization for the Pfizer–BioNTech COVID‑19 vaccine under the brand name Comirnaty. The recommendation was accepted by the European Commission the same day.

In February 2021, the Brazilian Health Regulatory Agency approved the Pfizer–BioNTech COVID‑19 vaccine under its standard marketing authorization procedure. In June 2021, the approval was extended to those aged twelve or over. Pfizer's negotiation process with Brazil (and other Latin American countries) was described as "bullying". The contract prohibits the state of Brazil from publicly discussing the existence or the terms of their agreement with Pfizer–BioNTech without the former's written consent. Brazil was also restricted from donating or receiving donations of vaccines.

In July 2021, the U.S. Food and Drug Administration (FDA) granted priority review designation for the biologics license application (BLA) for the Pfizer–BioNTech COVID-19 vaccine with a goal date for the decision in January 2022. On 23 August 2021, the FDA approved the vaccine for use for those aged sixteen years and older.

The Pfizer-BioNTech Comirnaty COVID-19 vaccine was authorized in Canada in September 2021, for people aged twelve and older.

In July 2022, the FDA approved the vaccine for use for those aged twelve years and older.

In September 2022, the CHMP of the EMA recommended converting the conditional marketing authorizations of the vaccine into standard marketing authorizations. The recommendation covers all existing and upcoming adapted Comirnaty vaccines, including the adapted Comirnaty Original/Omicron BA.1 (tozinameran/riltozinameran) and Comirnaty Original/Omicron BA.4/5 (tozinameran/famtozinameran).

=== Administering of the first non-clinical doses ===
The first dose administered outside of a clinical trial was given to 90-year-old Margaret Keenan in the outpatient ward at Coventry University Hospital on 8 December 2020. The vial and syringe used for her injection was subsequently sent for display to the Science Museum in London. The first dose administered outside of a clinical trial in the United States was given to Sandra Lindsay on 14 December 2020.

=== Further development ===
==== Homologous prime-boost vaccination ====
In July 2021, Israel's Prime Minister announced that the country was rolling out a third dose of the Pfizer-BioNTech vaccine to people over the age of 60, based on data that suggested significant waning immunity from infection over time for those with two doses. The country expanded the availability to all Israelis over the age of 12, after five months since their second shot. On 29 August 2021, Israel's coronavirus czar announced that Israelis who had not received a booster shot within six months of their second dose would lose access to the country's green pass vaccine passport. Studies performed in Israel found that a third dose reduced the incidence of serious illness.

In August 2021, the United States Department of Health and Human Services (HHS) announced a plan to offer a booster dose eight months after the second dose, citing evidence of reduced protection against mild and moderate disease and the possibility of reduced protection against severe disease, hospitalization, and death. The US Food and Drug Administration (FDA) and the Centers for Disease Control and Prevention (CDC) authorized the use of an additional mRNA vaccine dose for immunocompromised individuals at that time. Scientists and the WHO noted in August 2021, the lack of evidence on the need for a booster dose for healthy people and that the vaccine remains effective against severe disease months after administration. In a statement, the WHO and Strategic Advisory Group of Experts (SAGE) said that, while protection against infection may be diminished, protection against severe disease will likely be retained due to cell-mediated immunity. Research into optimal timing for boosters is ongoing, and a booster too early may lead to less robust protection.

In September 2021, the FDA and CDC authorizations were extended to provide a third shot for other specific groups.

In October 2021, the European Medicines Agency (EMA) stated that a booster shot of the vaccine could be given to healthy people, aged 18 years and older, at least six months after their second dose. It also stated that people with "severely weakened" immune systems can receive an extra dose of either the Pfizer-BioNTech vaccine or the Moderna vaccine starting at least 28 days after their second dose. The final approval to provide booster shots in the European Union will be decided by each national government.

In October 2021, the FDA and the CDC authorized the use of either homologous or heterologous vaccine booster doses.

In October 2021, the Australian Therapeutic Goods Administration (TGA) provisionally approved a booster dose of Comirnaty for people 18 years of age and older.

In January 2022, the FDA expanded the emergency use authorization to provide for the use of a vaccine booster dose to those aged 12 through 15 years of age, and it shortened the waiting period after primary vaccination to five months from six months.

In May 2022, the FDA expanded the emergency use authorization to provide for the use of a vaccine booster dose to those aged 5 through 11 years of age.

In August 2022, the FDA revoked the emergency use authorization for the monovalent vaccine booster for people aged twelve years of age and older and replaced it with an emergency use authorization for the bivalent vaccine booster dose for the same age group.

==== Heterologous prime-boost vaccination ====
In October 2021, the US Food and Drug Administration (FDA) and the Centers for Disease Control and Prevention (CDC) authorized the use of either homologous or heterologous vaccine booster doses. The authorization was expanded to include all adults in November 2021.

==== Bivalent booster vaccination ====
In August 2022, the "Pfizer-BioNTech COVID-19 Vaccine, Bivalent (Original and Omicron BA.4/BA.5)" (in short: "COVID-19 Vaccine, Bivalent") received an emergency use authorization from the US Food and Drug Administration (FDA) for use as a booster dose in individuals aged twelve years of age and older. One dose contains 15 mcg of "a nucleoside-modified messenger RNA (modRNA) encoding the viral spike (S) glycoprotein of SARS-CoV-2 Wuhan-Hu-1 strain (Original)" and 15 mcg "of modRNA encoding the S glycoprotein of SARS-CoV-2 Omicron variant lineages BA.4 and BA.5 (Omicron BA.4/BA.5)".

The bivalent vaccine authorized in the United States is different from the one that was authorized for use in the United Kingdom as the latter contains as second modRNA component 15 mcg of modRNA enocoding the S gylcoprotein of the earlier BA.1 variant.

In September 2022, the European Union authorized both the BA.1 and the BA.4/BA.5 booster versions of the bivalent vaccine for people aged twelve years of age and older.

While the Omicron BA.1 vaccine has been tested in a clinical study, the Omicron BA.4/BA.5 vaccine was only tested in pre-clinical studies. According to the published presentation, the neutralization responses of Omicron BA.4/BA.5 monovalent, Omicron BA.1 mononvalent, Omicron BA.4/BA.5 bivalent and the original BNT162b2 vaccine have been explored in a study with BALB/c-mice.

In October 2022, the FDA amended the authorization for the bivalent booster to cover people aged five years of age and older.

In December 2022, the FDA amended the authorization for the bivalent booster to be used as the third dose in people aged six months through four years of age.

==== XBB.1.5 monovalent vaccine ====
In September 2023, the FDA approved an updated monovalent (single) component Omicron variant XBB.1.5 version of the vaccine (Comirnaty 2023–2024 formula) as a single dose for individuals aged twelve years of age and older; and authorized the Pfizer-BioNTech COVID-19 Vaccine 2023–2024 formula under emergency use for individuals aged 6 months through 11 years of age. The approvals and emergency authorizations for the bivalent versions of the vaccine were revoked. Health Canada approved the Pfizer-BioNTech Comirnaty Omicron XBB.1.5 subvariant, monovalent COVID‑19 vaccine in September 2023. The UK Medicines and Healthcare products Regulatory Agency approved the used of the Comirnaty Omicron XBB.1.5 vaccine in September 2023.

==== JN.1 monovalent vaccine ====
Comirnaty JN.1 contains bretovameran, an mRNA molecule with instructions for producing a protein from the Omicron JN.1 subvariant of SARS-CoV-2. It is under evaluation in Australia.

==== KP.2 monovalent vaccine ====
In August 2024, the FDA approved and granted emergency authorization for a monovalent Omicron KP.2 version of the Pfizer–BioNTech COVID-19 vaccine. In June 2024, the FDA advised manufacturers of licensed and authorized COVID-19 vaccines that the COVID-19 vaccines (2024-2025 formula) should be monovalent JN.1 vaccines. Based on the further evolution of SARS-CoV-2 and a rise in cases of COVID-19, the agency subsequently determined and advised manufacturers that the preferred JN.1-lineage for the COVID-19 vaccines (2024-2025 formula) is the KP.2 strain. It was approved for use in the European Union.

==== LP.8.1 monovalent vaccine ====
The most recent version of the vaccine is LP.8.1 targeted for the Northern Hemisphere 2025 autumn and Southern Hemisphere 2026 autumn.

== Society and culture ==
About 649 million doses of the Pfizer–BioNTech COVID-19 vaccine, including about 55 million doses in children and adolescents (below 18 years of age) were administered in the EU/EEA from authorization to 26 June 2022.

=== Brand names ===
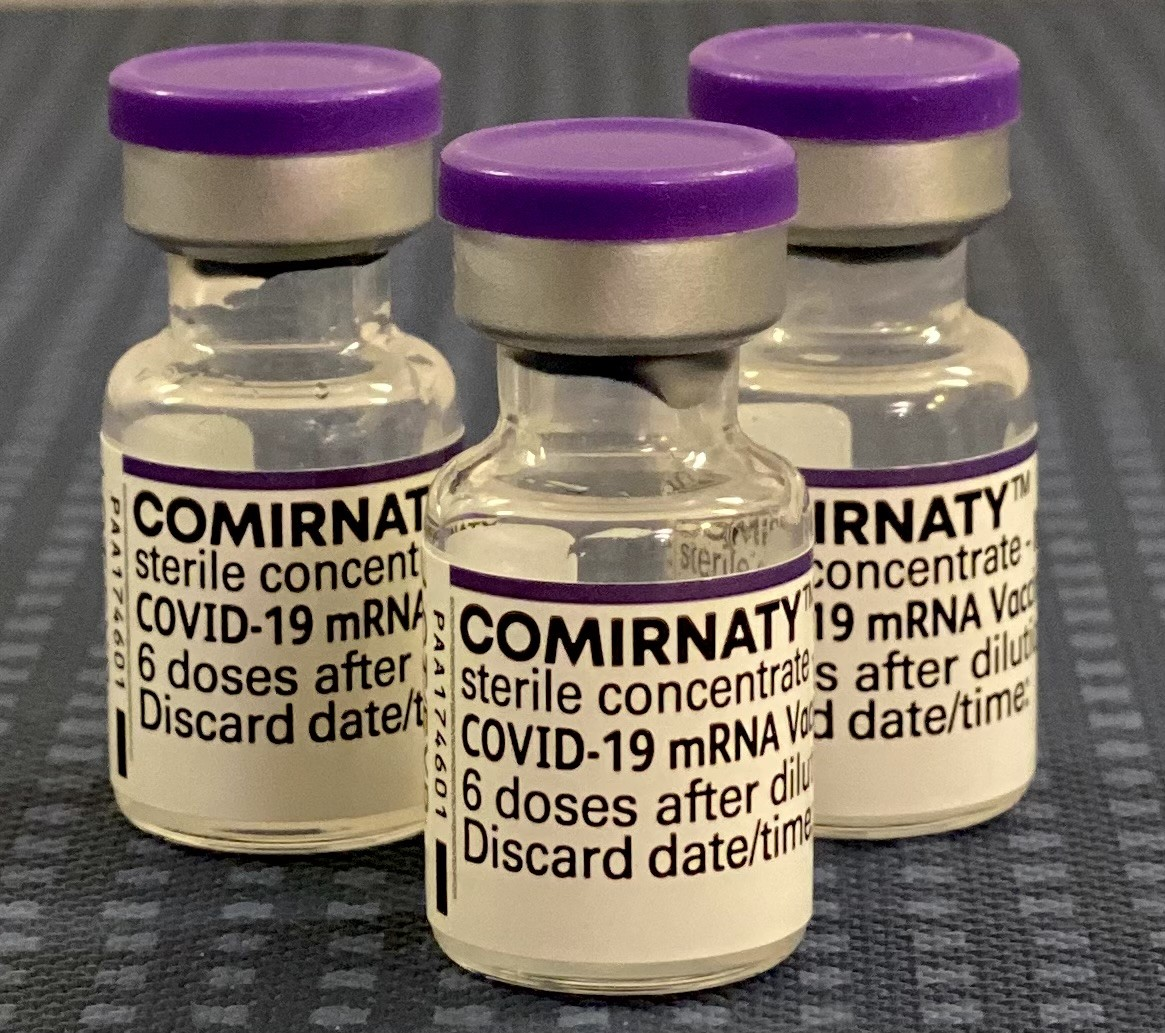
Comirnaty

BNT162b2 was the code name during development and testing, tozinameran is the international nonproprietary name (INN), and Comirnaty is the brand name. According to BioNTech, the name Comirnaty "represents a combination of the terms COVID‑19, mRNA, community, and immunity".

Famtozinameran is the INN for the BA.5 variant in the bivalent version of the vaccine.

Raxtozinameran is the INN for the XBB 1.5 variant version of the vaccine.

=== Economics ===
Pfizer reported revenue of US$154 million from the Pfizer–BioNTech COVID-19 vaccine in 2020, $36 billion in 2021, and $11.220 billion in 2023.

In July 2020, the vaccine development program Operation Warp Speed placed an advance order of US$1.95 billion with Pfizer to manufacture 100 million doses of a COVID‑19 vaccine for use in the United States if the vaccine was shown to be safe and effective. By mid-December 2020, Pfizer had agreements to supply 300 million doses to the European Union, 120 million doses to Japan, 40 million doses (10 million before 2021) to the United Kingdom, 20 million doses to Canada, an unspecified number of doses to Singapore, and 34.4 million doses to Mexico. Fosun also has agreements to supply 10 million doses to Hong Kong and Macau.

=== Pfizergate investigation ===
Accounts of how Pfizer's got its way into a large deal to provide 1.8 billion doses of its vaccine to the European Union were described by The New York Times as "a striking alignment of political survival and corporate hustle". Shots worth €4 billion were reportedly wasted before the deal was re-negotiated. In early 2023, Belgian prosecutors began investigating European Commission President Ursula von der Leyen and Pfizer CEO Albert Bourla. The case was taken over in 2024 by the European Public Prosecutor's Office citing "interference in public functions, destruction of SMS, corruption and conflict of interest."

=== Access ===
Pfizer has been accused of hindering vaccine equity. In 2021, Pfizer delivered only 39% of the contractually agreed doses to the COVAX programme, a number that equals 1.5% of all vaccines produced by Pfizer. The company sold 67% of their doses to high-income countries and sold none directly to low-income countries.

Pfizer actively lobbied against the temporary lift of intellectual property rights which would allow the vaccine to be produced by others without having to pay a royalty fee.

=== Misinformation ===
Videos on video-sharing platforms circulated around May 2021 showing people having magnets stick to their arms after receiving the vaccine, purportedly demonstrating the conspiracy theory that vaccines contain microchips, but these videos have been debunked.
