= Langen (Hess) station =

Railway station in Langen, Hesse, Germany

Langen (Hess)
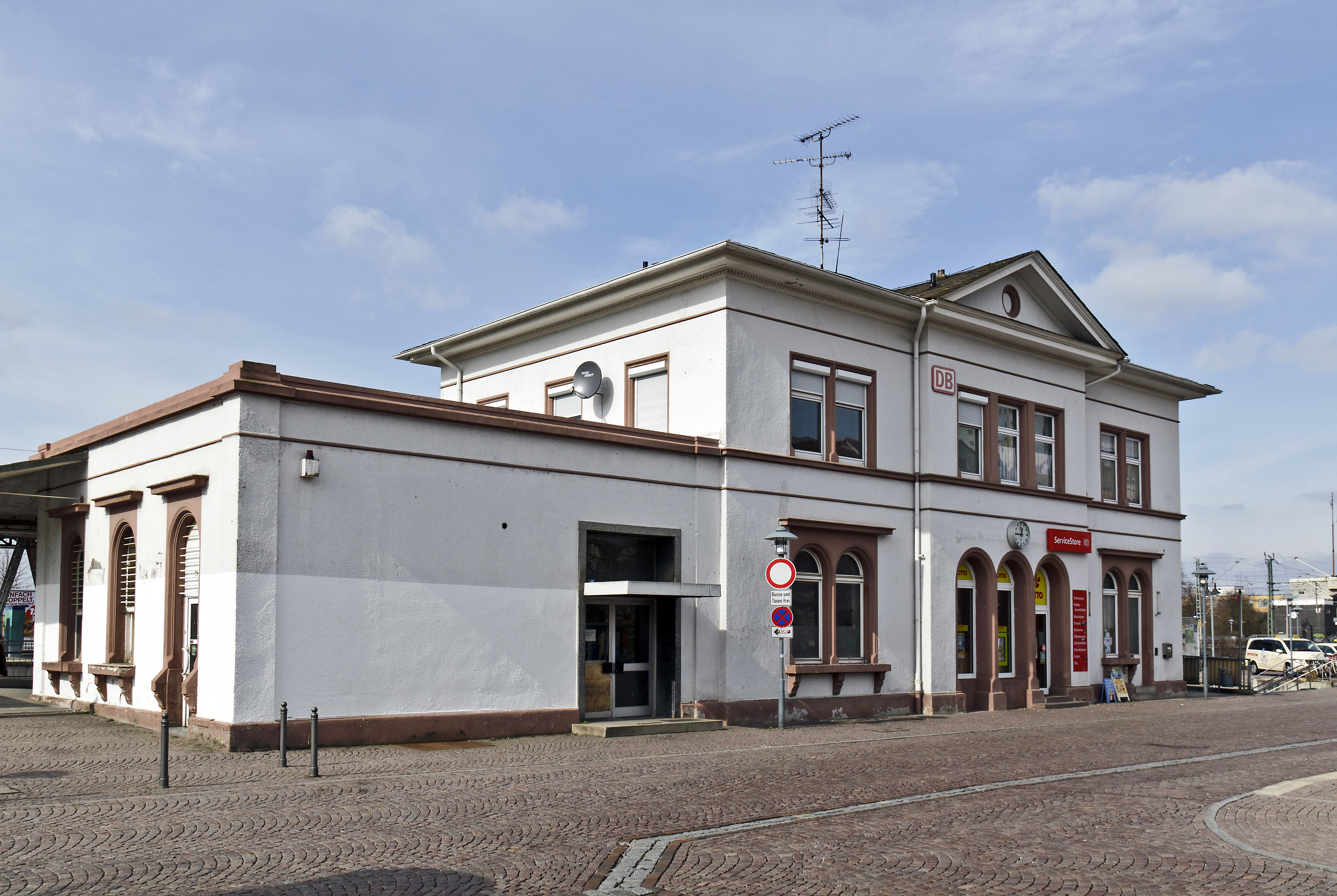

General information
- Location: Bahnhofsanlage 2, Langen, Hesse; Germany
- Coordinates: 49°59′36″N 8°39′25″E
- Line: Main-Neckar Railway
- Platforms: 4

Construction
- Accessible: Yes

Other information
- Station code: 3524
- DS100 code: FLG
- Category: 4
- Fare zone: : 3501
- Website: www.bahnhof.de

History
- Opened: June 22, 1846; 180 years ago

Services
Preceding station	DB Regio Mitte	Following station
Frankfurt (Main) Hbf Terminus	RE 60	Darmstadt Hbf towards Mannheim Hbf
Frankfurt (Main) Hbf Terminus	RB 67	Darmstadt Hbf towards Mannheim Hbf or Hockenheim
Frankfurt (Main) Hbf Terminus	RB 68	Darmstadt Hbf towards Wiesloch-Walldorf
Preceding station	Rhine-Main S-Bahn	Following station
Langen Flugsicherung towards Friedberg (Hess)	S6 (Rhine-Main S-Bahn)	Egelsbach towards Darmstadt Hbf
Location
- Location within Hesse Location within Germany Location within Europe

Langen (Hess) station is in the town of Langen in the German state of Hesse. It was opened in 1846 with the Main-Neckar Railway and is now served by the Rhine-Main S-Bahn. The station has two side platforms, an island platform and a through track without a platform. The station building and platform canopies are protected as monuments. It is classified by Deutsche Bahn as a category 4 station.

== History ==
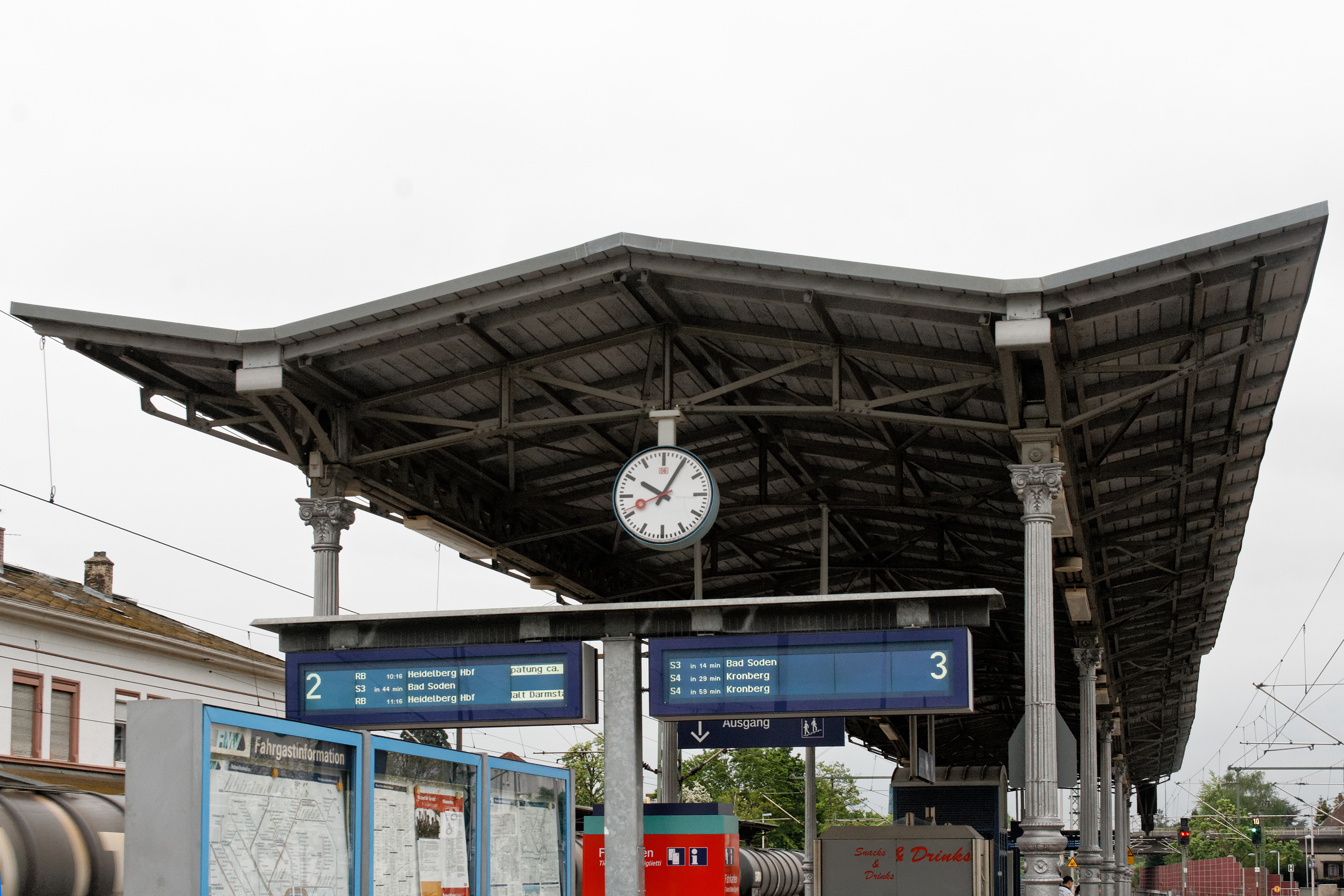
Platform canopy between the tracks

The station was opened in 1846 as part of the Main-Neckar Railway. The first section of the line was opened between Langen, Darmstadt and Bensheim on 22 June 1846 and the section from Langen to Frankfurt followed on 16 July 1846. There was a major redesign of the station as part of the construction of the S-Bahn line between Frankfurt and Darmstadt, which was opened on 2 June 1997. Since then, it has had three platforms, four platform tracks and a through track without a platform running towards Darmstadt. In 2012 the tracks were renewed in the station area.

An 82 m² large Servicestore owned by Deutsche Bahn was established at the station in 2009, which is operated by a franchisee. The former ticket hall is closed. The station has 361 bicycle parking spaces, 50 of which are in lockable boxes.

== Entrance building ==
The two-storey entrance building with a basement was built in 1846 on the eastern side of the line towards the town. The building was designed with a neoclassical and symmetrical facade with seven portals under a gable facing the street. On the ground floor there are two pairs of arched windows on the sides with three arched doorways in the middle. This pattern is repeated upstairs, but using rectangular windows. The street frontage is further enhanced by an avant-corps under the gable. A hip roof over a wide frieze and dentils forms the upper part. The platform canopy in front of the entrance building is supported by lattice beams on thin columns with small capitals of cast iron. The two free-standing platform canopies also have cast-iron columns with capitals, which date from 1861. They come from the Darmstadt Main-Neckar station, which was closed after World War I and are also protected as monuments.

== Rail services ==
The station is served hourly by Regionalbahn service lines RB 67 and RB 68 between Frankfurt, Darmstadt and Mannheim or Heidelberg, which runs jointly between Frankfurt and Neu-Edingen, and about every two hours by Regional-Express line RE 60 between Frankfurt, Darmstadt and Mannheim. In addition, Rhine-Main S-Bahn services run to Darmstadt every half-hour and to Frankfurt every fifteen minutes, continuing to Kronberg or Bad Soden am Taunus.

Line	Route	Frequency
RE 60	Frankfurt Hbf – Langen (Hess) – Darmstadt Hbf – Bensheim – Weinheim – Mannheim Hbf	60/120 min
RB 67	Frankfurt Hbf – Langen (Hess) – Neu-Edingen – Darmstadt Hbf – Bensheim – Weinheim – Mannheim	60 min
RB 68	Frankfurt Hbf – Langen (Hess) – Neu-Edingen – Darmstadt Hbf – Bensheim – Weinheim – Heidelberg Hbf	60 min
S6 (Rhine-Main S-Bahn)	Friedberg (Hess) – Bad Vilbel – Frankfurt West – Frankfurt – Frankfurt Süd – Langen – Darmstadt Hbf	15 min Frankfurt-Langen, 30 min Langen-Darmstadt (weekdays)

Langen bus station is served by bus routes OF 71, 72, 73, 75, 91, 96, 99, X83 and 662 towards Seligenstadt, Offenbach, Mörfelden, the town centre and other neighboring towns.
