= Johannes Löwer =

Austrian/German biochemist and physician (born 1944)

Johannes Löwer (born 20 November 1944 in Vienna) is an Austrian/German biochemist and physician, who served as President of the Paul Ehrlich Institute from 1999 to 2009 and as President of the Federal Institute for Drugs and Medical Devices from 2009 to 2010.

He studied medicine in Würzburg and Tübingen, earned a doctorate in medicine in 1970 and then went on to study biochemistry; he earned a master's degree in biochemistry in 1975 and a Habilitation in medical virology at the Goethe University Frankfurt in 1990.

He joined the Paul Ehrlich Institute as a scientist in 1981, and headed the department of virology from 1988 to 1991. In 1991 he became the Institute's vice president; he became acting president 1999 and was formally appointed as the Institute's permanent president in 2001.
