= Maximilian Müger =

German politician (born 1993)

Member of the Landtag of Hesse
- Incumbent
- Assumed office 18 January 2024

Personal details
- Born: 21 January 1993 (age 33) Langen
- Party: Independent (since 2024)
- Other political affiliations: Alternative for Germany (2013–2024)

Maximilian Müger (born 21 January 1993 in Langen) is a German politician serving as a member of the Landtag of Hesse since 2024. From 2013 to 2024, he was a member of the Alternative for Germany. On September 6, 2024, Müger left the AfD and the AfD parliamentary group and has since been an independent member of the state parliament.
