= Paul Ehrlich Institute =

German medical research institute

- Paul-Ehrlich-Institut – Bundesinstitut für Impfstoffe und biomedizinische Arzneimittel

Agency overview
- Formed: 1 June 1896; 130 years ago
- Jurisdiction: Government of Germany
- Headquarters: Langen, Hesse, Germany
- Employees: ≈800
- Agency executive: Klaus Cichutek, President
- Website: www.pei.de

The Paul Ehrlich Institute (German: Paul-Ehrlich-Institut – Bundesinstitut für Impfstoffe und biomedizinische Arzneimittel; PEI) is a German federal agency, medical regulatory body and research institution for vaccines and biomedicines. It was founded in 1896 and is subordinate to the Federal Ministry of Health. The institute is a WHO Collaborating Centre for quality assurance of blood products and in vitro diagnostic devices. It is located in Langen, Hesse, near Frankfurt, and was located in Frankfurt for most of the 20th century. It is named for its founding director, the immunologist and Nobel Prize laureate Paul Ehrlich.

== History ==
The Paul Ehrlich Institute was founded on 1 June 1896 in Steglitz, Berlin as the Institute for Serum Research and Serum Testing (Institut für Serumforschung und Serumprüfung), with immunologist Paul Ehrlich, one of Germany's most prominent medical researchers at the time, as its first director. The institute was founded specifically to provide a platform for Ehrlich's research. In 1899, it moved to Frankfurt and was renamed the Royal Institute for Experimental Therapy (Königliches Institut für experimentelle Therapie). After Germany had become a republic in 1919, it was renamed the National Institute for Experimental Therapy (Staatliches Institut für Experimentelle Therapie). Ehrlich received numerous honours in Germany and was awarded the 1908 Nobel Prize in medicine. In 1947, the institute was renamed the Paul Ehrlich Institute in honour of its founding director. In 1987, the institute moved from Paul-Ehrlich-Straße in Frankfurt to Langen, Hesse, a suburb south of Frankfurt. In 2009, the addition Bundesamt für Sera und Impfstoffe was renamed Bundesinstitut für Impfstoffe und biomedizinische Arzneimittel.

== Activities ==
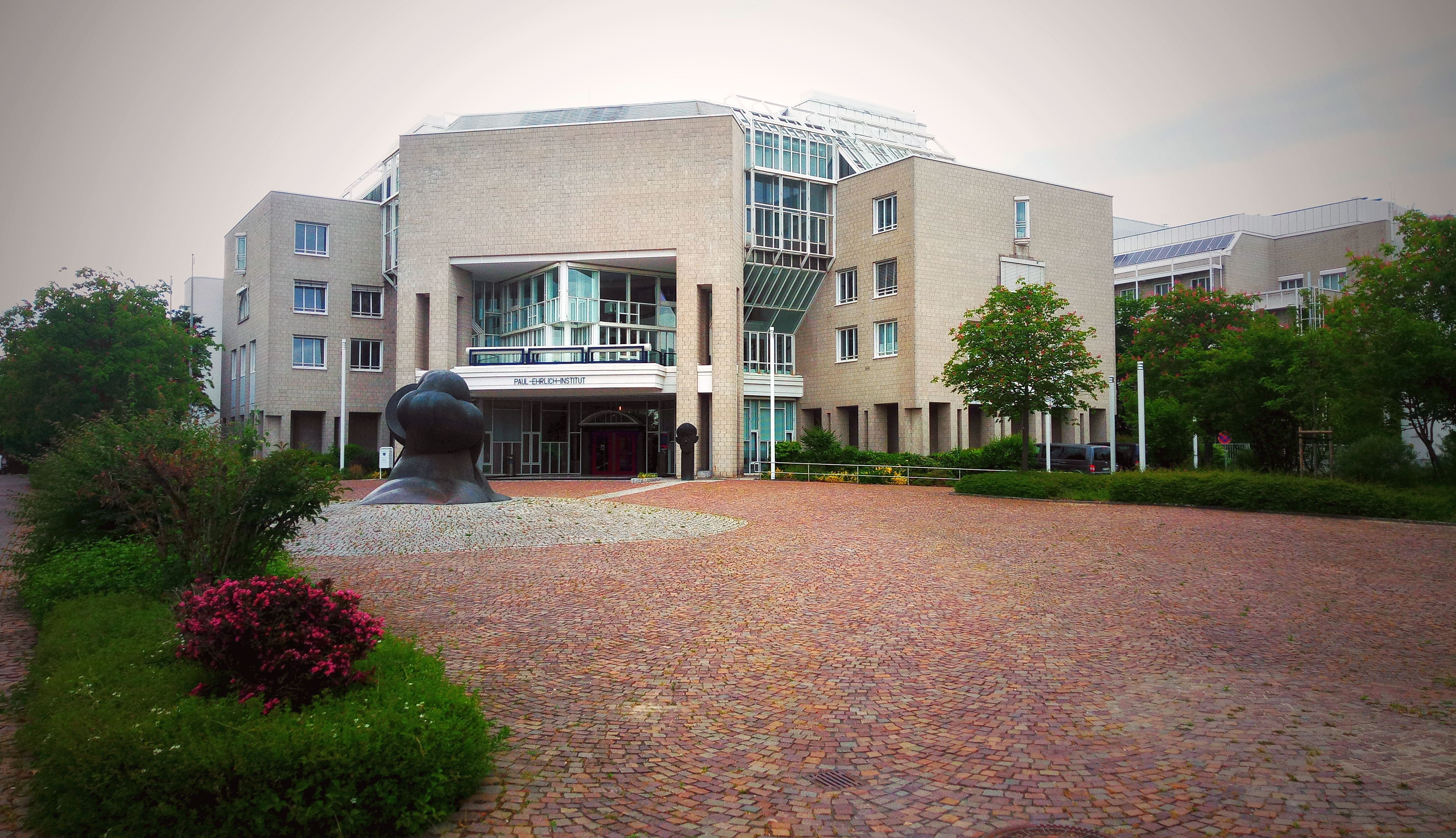
Entrance of the institute in 2022

The regulatory tasks of the Paul Ehrlich Institute include the marketing authorisation of particular groups of medicinal products and the approval of clinical trials. The medicinal products in the responsibility of the PEI are: vaccines for humans and animals, medicinal products containing antibodies, allergens for therapy and products for diagnostic tests, blood and blood products and tissue and medicinal products for gene therapy, somatic cell therapy and xenogenic cell therapy.

== Directors and Presidents ==
- Paul Ehrlich (1908 Nobel laureate in medicine) 1896–1915
- Wilhelm Kolle 1917–1935
- Richard Otto 1938–1948
- Richard Prigge 1949–1962
- Günther Heymann 1962–1966
- Niels Kaj Jerne (1984 Nobel laureate in medicine) 1966–1969
- Günther Heymann 1969–1973
- Hans Dieter Brede 1974–1987
- Reinhard Kurth 1987–1999
- Johannes Löwer 1999–2009 (acting 1999–2001)
- Klaus Cichutek 2009–present
