= Langen, Hesse =

- Town
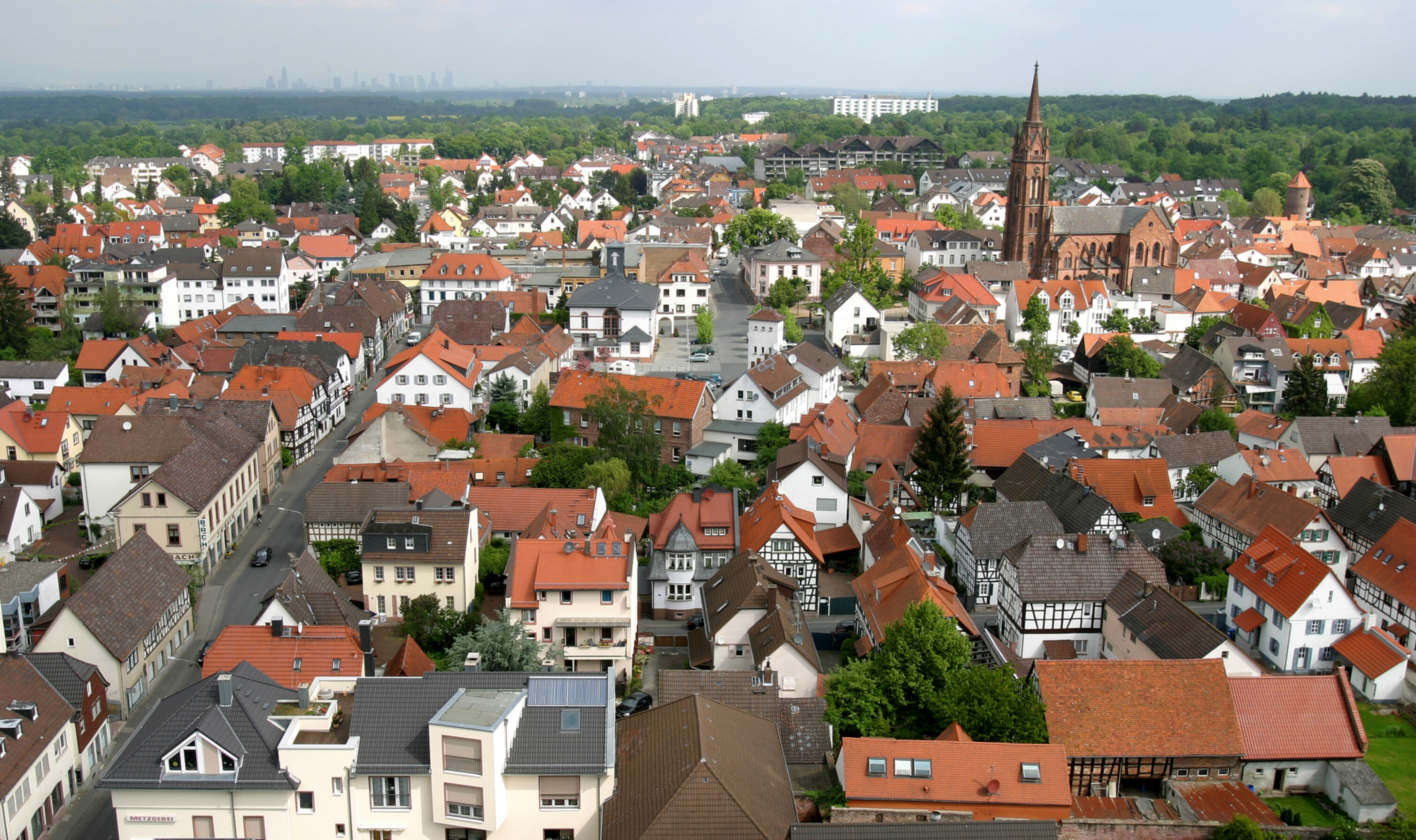
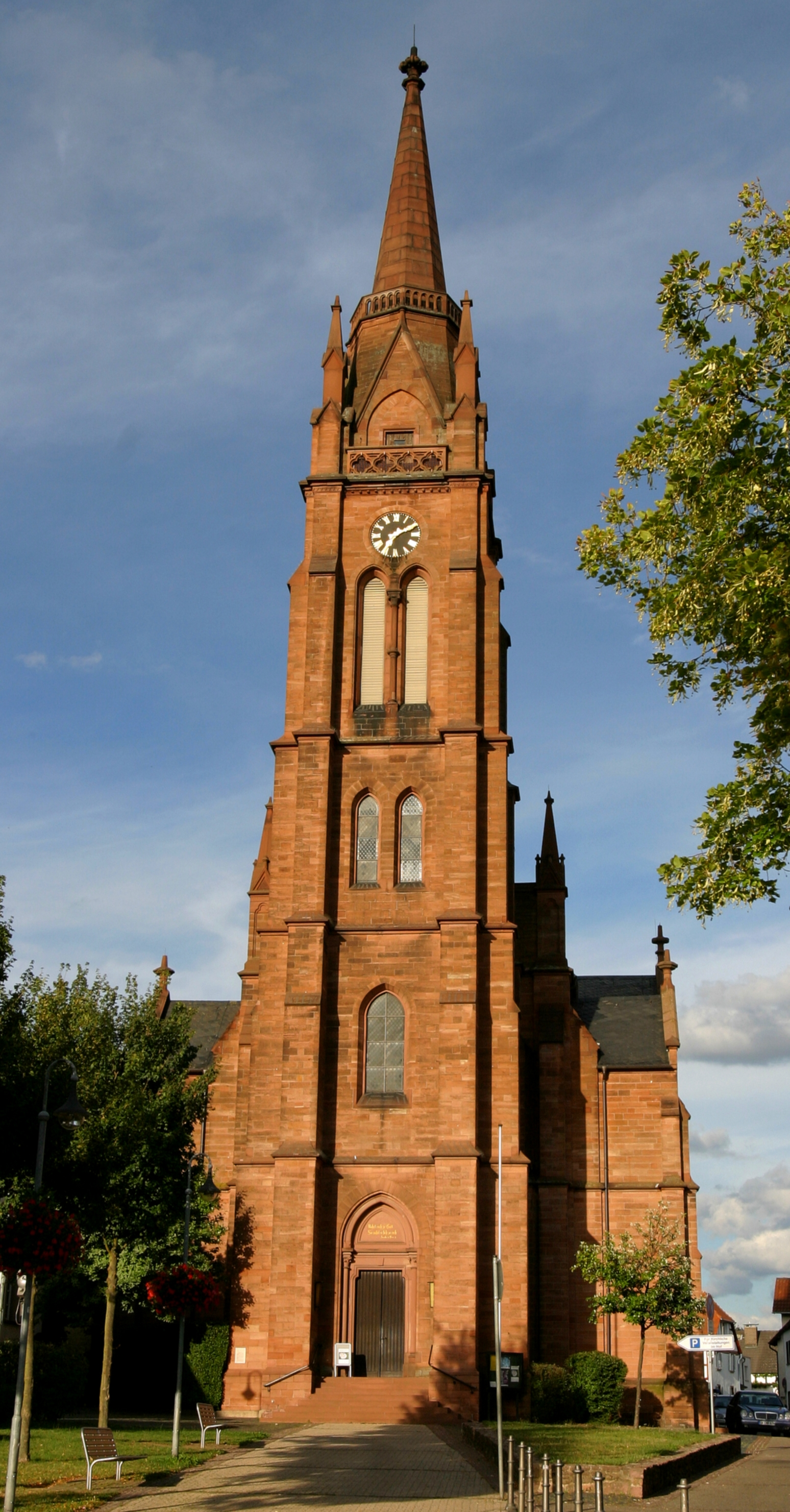
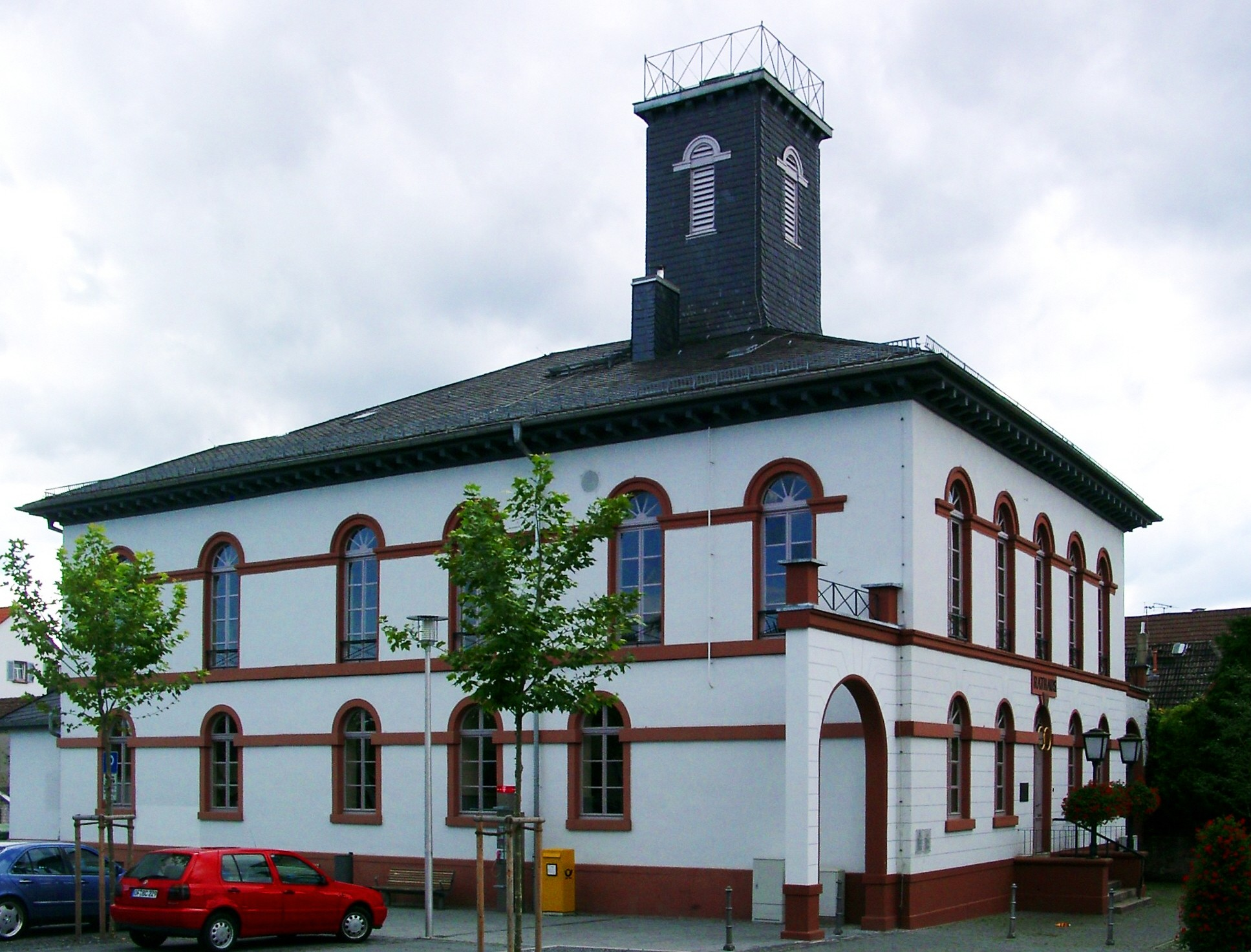
- Old town Evangelische Stadtkirche Old town hall

- Coat of arms

- Location of Langen, Hesse within Offenbach district
- Interactive map of Langen, Hesse
- Location within Germany Location within Hesse
- Coordinates: 49°59′N 8°40′E
- Country: Germany
- State: Hesse
- Admin. region: Darmstadt
- District: Offenbach

Government
  - Mayor (2020–26): Jan Werner (Ind.)

Area
  - Total: 29.12 km^{2} (11.24 sq mi)
- Elevation: 143 m (469 ft)

Population (2025-12-31)
  - Total: 39,009
  - Density: 1,340/km^{2} (3,470/sq mi)
- Time zone: UTC+01:00 (CET)
  - Summer (DST): UTC+02:00 (CEST)
- Postal codes: 63225
- Dialling codes: 06103
- Vehicle registration: OF
- Website: www.langen.de

Langen (German pronunciation: [ˈlaŋən]) is a town of roughly 39,000 in the Offenbach district in the Regierungsbezirk of Darmstadt in Hesse, Germany. The town is between Darmstadt and Frankfurt am Main and part of the Frankfurt Rhein-Main urban area. Langen is headquarters to Deutsche Flugsicherung (German air traffic control), and is also home to the Paul-Ehrlich-Institut, a federal institute for the evaluation and supervision of sera and vaccines in Germany.

== Geography ==
=== Neighbouring communities ===
Langen borders in the north and northeast on the town of Dreieich, in the south on the community of Egelsbach and in the west on the town of Mörfelden-Walldorf (Groß-Gerau district).

=== Constituent communities ===
Langen is only subdivided internally. Its Stadtteile are:

- Altstadt ("Old Town") in the east. This lies within the former eastern town wall, parts of which may still be seen. There is an Altstadtordnung ("Old Town Order") in force for the Old Town, meant to preserve the many timber-frame houses’ character.
- Zentrum ("Centre") in the middle of Langen. This is surrounded by the other Stadtteile.
- Neurott, in the northwest. This is a great industrial-commercial area, in which businesses such as Borland and Oracle have their offices. Here are also found the headquarters of Deutsche Flugsicherung (German Air Traffic Control) and the Paul-Ehrlich-Institut. There are also residential neighbourhoods in Neurott. One of them was built in 1958 for United States troops from the nearby Rhein-Main Air Base (closed in 2005), and so it is equipped with basketball courts and a baseball diamond. In September 2008, the US Army gave the Langen Terrace Rhein-Main U.S. Air Force Family Housing Area back to the Federal Republic. The dwellings are now to be leased by the Bundesanstalt für Immobilienaufgaben (BImA, the German government agency for administering and utilizing government land). Furthermore, the question of whether it would be possible for there to be denser building is being examined.
- Nordend ("North End"), a residential neighbourhood in which are found many dwelling blocks and highrises.
- Linden and Oberlinden in the west came into being as pure residential neighbourhoods and at the time they raised Langen's population considerably.
- Steinberg in the southeast. Here, since the late 1990s, there have been terraced houses for one, two or three families.

== History ==
The earliest community here may have arisen about AD 500 or 600, settled by Frankish migrants. Langen had its first documentary mention in 834 in a donation document from King Ludwig II to the Lorsch Abbey under the name Langungon. In 835, he had the extent of the Mark Langen (a communal area shared by a number of villages) delineated with Drieichlahha, today's Dreieich, as a neighbouring community to the north. To the Dreieich Royal Hunting Forest (Wildbann Dreieich), which in the king's name was governed by the Lords of Hagen (later of Münzenberg) as Vögte, also belonged in the Middle Ages the woodlands around Langen. Two of the Royal Hunting Forest's 30 Wildhuben (farming estates whose owners were charged with guarding the king's hunting rights) lay in Langen. Since the Lorsch Abbey hardly worried very much about their landholdings, the Lords of Hagen-Münzenberg came over the course of time to be the land's effective owners.

When the Hagen-Münzenberg family died out in 1255, the place passed to the Lords of Falkenstein. In 1414, the village burnt down in the midst of a dispute between the city of Frankfurt and the then owners of Langen, the Archbishop of Trier, Werner von Falkenstein. When the Lords of Falkenstein, too, saw their male line come to an end in 1418, the County of Isenburg inherited the lordship over Langen. Surviving from the Middle Ages are, among other things remains of the fortifications with the spitzer Turm and the stumpfer Turm ("Sharp Tower" and "Blunt Tower") from Falkenstein times (1336), and from the Renaissance the Vierröhrenbrunnen ("Four-Pipe Spring") from 1553.

In 1600, Langen, along with the whole Amt of Kelsterbach was sold by the Counts of Isenburg to the Landgraviate of Hesse-Darmstadt. Langen has belonged to Hesse since then. With the partitioning of the Länger Mark in 1732, whose main estate Langen was, the community got two thirds of the land, and Egelsbach the other third.

In 1812, Langen was raised to market community. After the French period, in 1821, Langen was raised to seat of the Landratsbezirk, practically making Langen a district seat, although in 1832 it had to yield this function to Groß-Gerau and Offenbach. In 1834, Langen had 2,368 inhabitants. In 1846, the Main-Neckar Railway (88 km) was opened with a railway station in Langen. In 1862, the Offenbach district was formed. In 1883, the community was granted town rights by Grand Duke Ludwig IV.

After the First World War, Langen was – as part of the Mainz bridgehead – occupied by French troops until 1930 (→ Occupation of the Rhineland). Around 1959, a new urban district, Oberlinden, was built. The population rose from 9,077 in 1939 to 28,500 in 1983.

== Politics ==
The town's mayor is Jan Werner (independent). The first councillor is Stefan Löbig (Green Party).

At the direct election for mayor on 27 January 2008, none of the seven candidates could secure the needed majority, and so on 10 February 2008, a runoff election was held between Frieder Gebhardt (SPD) and Berthold Matyschok (CDU). This was won by Gebhardt with 63.98% of the vote. Matyschok had only barely edged out the independent candidate Dr. Jan Werner (then also a CDU member) in the first round of voting. Frieder Gebhardt took office on 30 June 2008, succeeding his fellow party member Dieter Pitthan. His time in office is to run from 1 July 2008 to 30 June 2020 (re-election 2014). Pitthan, after 18 years in office, was named an honorary citizen. This makes Gebhardt, after Johannes Steitz (1946-1948), Wilhelm Umbach (1948-1966), Hans Kreiling (1966-1990) and Dieter Pitthan (1990-2008) Langen's fifth elected SPD mayor since the Second World War. In October 1945, Christian Zellhöfer (likewise SPD) was appointed mayor for a short time.

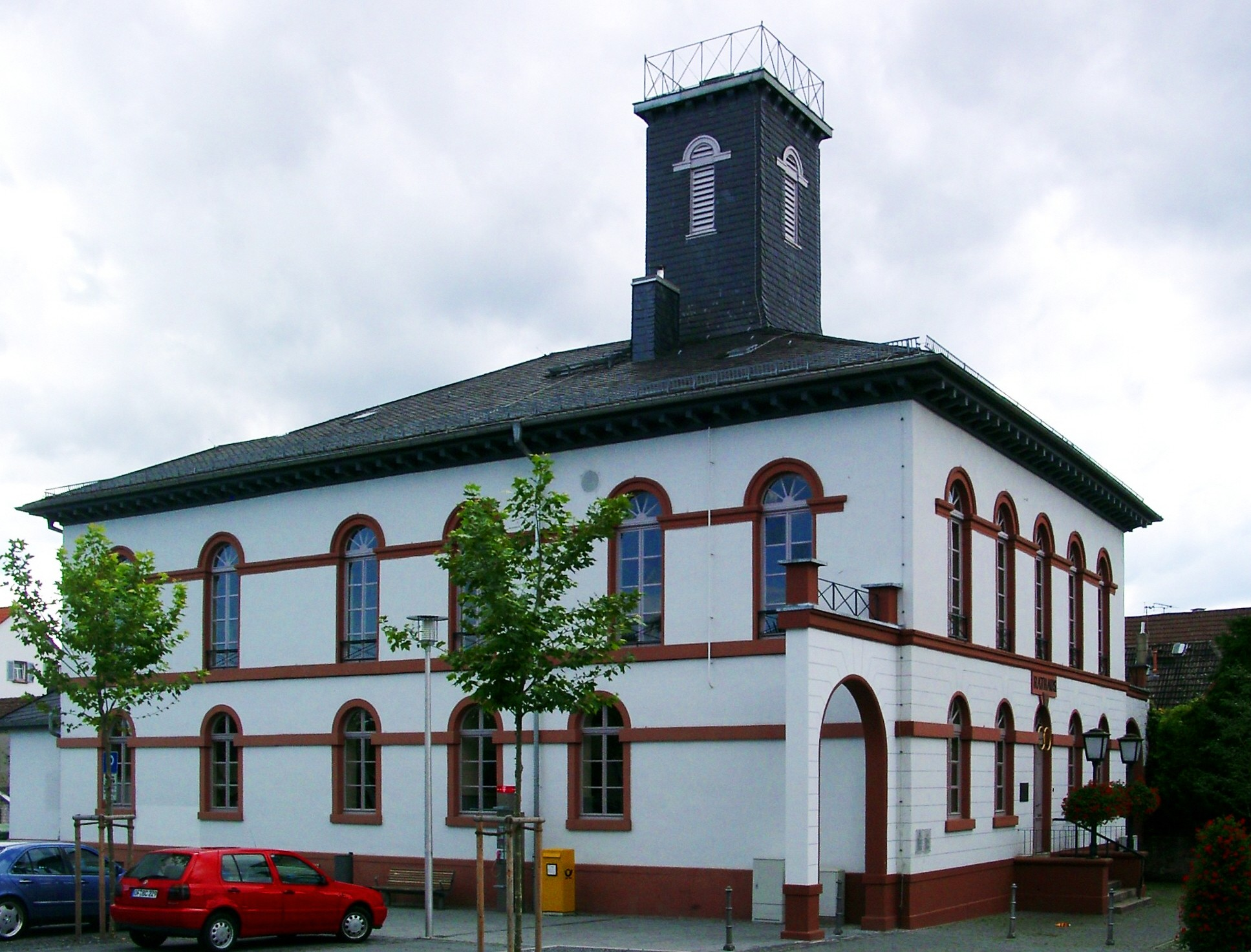
The Old Town Hall in Langen, today used as a museum

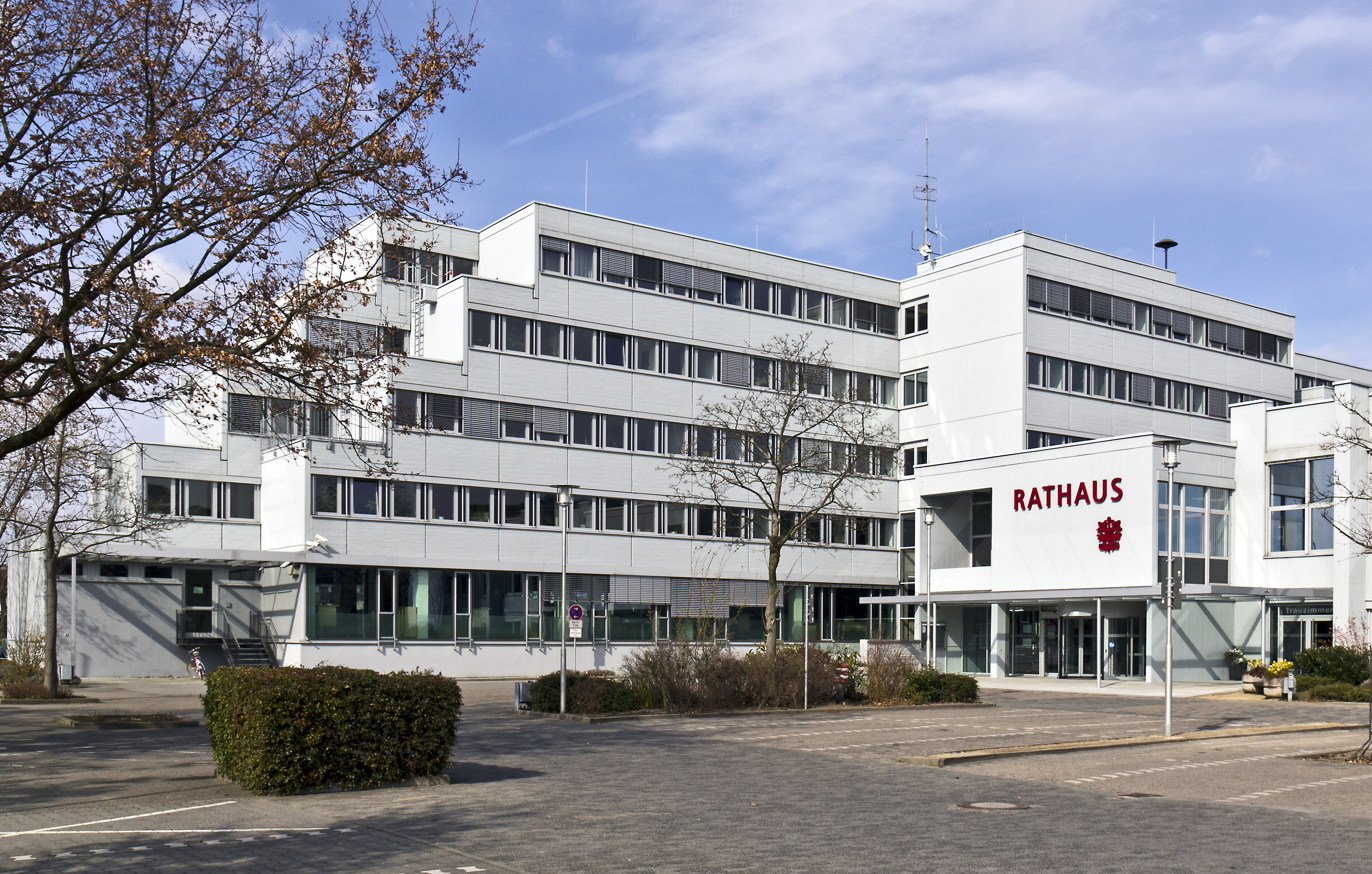
The New Town Hall in Langen

=== Town council ===
The municipal election held on 6 March 2016 yielded the following results, compared to previous elections:

Parties and voter communities		% 2016	Seats; 2016	% 2011	Seats; 2011	% 2006	Seats; 2006	% 2001	Seats; 2001
CDU	Christian Democratic Union of Germany	28.1	13	27.5	13	35.5	16	37.9	17
SPD	Social Democratic Party of Germany	22.9	10	26.3	12	31.4	14	32.0	14
GREENS	Bündnis 90/Die Grünen	17.0	8	24.4	11	14.7	7	14.7	7
FWG-NEV	Freie Wähler-Gemeinschaft - Nichtparteigebundene Einwohner-Vertreter	14.9	7	11.6	5	12.0	5	9.8	4
FDP	Free Democratic Party	7.8	3	4.2	2	6.4	3	5.5	3
LEFT	Die Linke	4.4	2	3.0	1	-	-	-	-
Freie Wähler/ UWFB	Unabhängige Wählervereinigung zur Förderung der Bürgermeister- und Kommunalwahlen / Free Voters	4.9	2	3.0	1	-	-	-	-
Total		100.0	45	100.0	45	100.0	45	100.0	45
Voter turnout in %		41.2		39.9		37.3		46.2	

== Culture ==
Well known outside the town is above all the Langen Ebbelwoi-Fest, to which tens of thousands of visitors come each year on the last weekend in June. Moreover, the Langener Waldsee, a favourite outing destination among dwellers of the nearby Main agglomeration, is within town limits. Since 2002, the swimming competition Ironman Germany (so called even in German) has been held there.

The town museum is found at the Old Town Hall in the Old Town. However, it opens only for special exhibitions, such as the one between May 2008 and March 2009 for the show Blick(e) zurück ("Looking Back") for the 125-year jubilee of town rights.

On the town's outskirts is found the former hunting palace of Schloß Wolfsgarten, which is owned by the House of Hesse.

Quite a few orchestras and musical groups frame Langen's cultural makeup. Among the most important are the Langen Orchestra Club and the TV 1862 Langen's (sport club) wind orchestra. Both groups furnish accompaniment to many of Langen's public events.

Langen's most successful sport team are the TV 1862 Langen's basketball players, who are represented in Pro A, Germany's second highest playing class. Home games are played at the Georg-Sehring-Halle.

== Economy and infrastructure ==
=== Transport ===
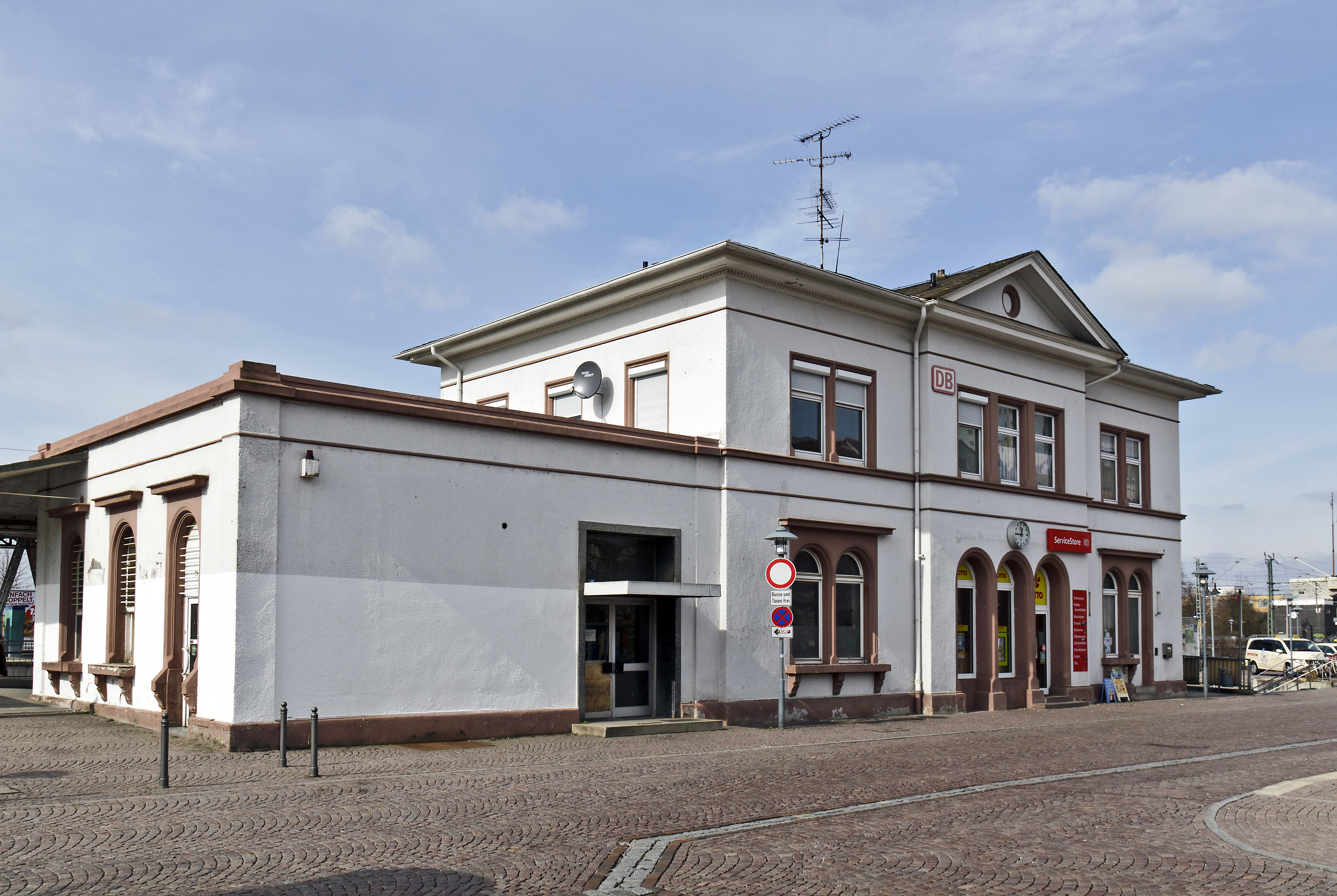
Langen station

Langen has good connections with all transport providers.

Langen station is on the Rhine-Main S-Bahn network running on the Main-Neckar line and is served by S-Bahn line. The travel time to downtown Frankfurt is roughly 20 minutes with trains running every 15 minutes. Moreover, regional trains on the Frankfurt-Mannheim RE 60 and Frankfurt-Heidelberg RB 68 runs stop here.

Furthermore, Langen is linked to the north–south Autobahnen A 5 (Langen/Mörfelden interchange in the town's west) and A 661 (Langen interchange in the east). Both interchanges are linked by the east–west Bundesstraße 486, which at the same time also forms the Langen north bypass. This new link also connects the industrial area in the northwest, in which are found, among other things, Federal authorities. Along Bundesstraße 486 towards the west, after about 15 km, drivers reach the Rüsselsheimer Dreieck ("Rüsselsheim Triangle"), where the A 60 towards Mainz branches off the A 67 (Darmstadt-Mönchhof).

Running across the municipal area is also the former Bundesstraße 3 from Frankfurt am Main to Darmstadt.

Frankfurt Egelsbach Airport, Germany's busiest general airport, lies in the neighbouring community of Egelsbach some 3 km away, while Europe's third biggest airport, Frankfurt Airport, is found about 10 km from Langen.

=== Authorities ===
In Langen, three Federal authorities are represented. The Paul-Ehrlich-Institut has its headquarters in the town, which since 1993 has also been the German Federal Office for Sera and Vaccines.

An outlying location of the Federal Office for Civil Aviation of Germany (Luftfahrtbundesamt) is connected to the headquarters of German Air Traffic Control. Likewise represented here are the Office for Bundeswehr Air Traffic Control (Amt für Flugsicherung der Bundeswehr) and the Air Traffic Control Academy (Flugsicherungsakademie) for training air traffic controllers. Also housed in the Air Traffic Control Academy's building is the Wetterdienstschule ("Weather Service School"), which was formerly in Neustadt an der Weinstraße.

Furthermore, an outlying location of the Umweltbundesamt ("Federal Environment Office") is found in the town, which grew out of the former Institute for Water, Soil and Air Hygiene (Institut für Wasser-, Boden- und Lufthygiene, or WaBoLu).

Plans in 2004 to close this by 2008 have since been revised. Henceforth the plans call for moving the institute in two stages to Berlin by 2018.

=== Established businesses ===
- Asklepios Kliniken
- Sun Microsystems
- Deutsche Post subsidiary DHL has built a postal centre in Langen for sending letters to the surrounding area.
- Borland
- Panasonic
- Nikon
- Vivendi Universal Publishing
- Bull Computer
- Fujitsu
- MISCO Germany
- THALES
- SAG
- Liferay
- The Bristol Group Deutschland GmbH manufacturer of independent IT security providers and service providers.
- Henry Schein

=== Education ===
==== Primary schools ====
- Albert-Schweitzer-Schule
- Geschwister-Scholl-Schule
- Ludwig-Erk-Schule
- Sonnenblumenschule
- Wallschule

==== Gymnasium ====
- Dreieichschule

==== Comprehensive schools ====
- Albert-Einstein-Schule (integrated comprehensive school)
- Adolf-Reichwein-Schule (coöperative comprehensive school)

==== Special schools ====
- Erich-Kästner-Schule – school for pupils with physical handicaps
- Janusz-Korczak-Schule - school for trainable pupils with mental handicaps

==== Colleges ====
- DFS-Flugsicherungsakademie

=== Media ===
The daily newspaper with the highest circulation is the Langener Zeitung, a local edition of the Offenbach-Post.

== Twin towns – sister cities ==
Langen is twinned with:

- Aranda de Duero, Spain
- Long Eaton, England, United Kingdom
- Romorantin-Lanthenay, France
- Tarsus, Turkey

== Notable people ==
- Willi Leininger (1907–1971), composer, music writer and journalist
- Friedrich Zängerle (1911–1996), trade unionist
- Rudi Sehring (born 1930), jazz drummer
- Henning Boëtius (born 1939), writer
- Tanja Börzel (born 1970), political scientist and university lecturer
- Jan Costin Wagner (born 1972), writer
- Meike Babel (born 1974), tennis player
- Carsten Nulle (born 1975), footballer
- Janine Wissler (born 1981), politician (Die Linke), member of the Hesse Landtag
- Ralf Schneider (born 1986), footballer
- Jennifer Hof (born 1991), model and winner of the third season of Germany's Next Top Model
- Maximilian Müger (born 1993), politician

== Leisure ==
- Leisure and family pool with adjoining rollerskating park
- Indoor swimming pool with warm bathing days
- Langener Waldsee (lake) with a naturism area and an angling area
- Youth centre with concerts and other activities
- Paddling pond with playground and much more
