= Klaus Cichutek =

German biochemist

Klaus Cichutek (born 26 February 1956 in Recklinghausen) is a German biochemist and the current president of the Paul Ehrlich Institute (PEI). He is also professor of biochemistry at the Goethe University Frankfurt.

== Early life and education ==
Cichutek completed his studies of chemistry in 1981 and earned a doctoral degree in biochemistry in 1984, both at the University of Münster.

== Career ==
From 1985 to 1988 Cichutek was affiliated with the Department of Molecular Biology and Virus Laboratory at the University of California, Berkeley. He has been employed by the Paul Ehrlich Institute since 1988; he became the institute's vice president in 1999 and its president in 2009.

In addition to his role at PEI, Cichutek chaired the Bundesärztekammer's commission on somatic gene therapy from 2000 to 2010, and the Gene Therapy Working Party of the European Medicines Agency (EMA) from 2003 to 2010. Since 2020, he has been an ex-officio member of a working group on COVID-19 vaccines established by the Strategic Advisory Group of Experts at the World Health Organization (WHO).

== Awards ==
- 2024 Officer's Cross of the Order of Merit of the Federal Republic of Germany

== Bibliography ==
- SIV grows unchanged in human cells. Werner A, Baier M, Cichutek K, Kurth R. Nature. 1990 Mar 8; 344(6262):113. DOI:10.1038/344113a0
- Development of a quasispecies of human immunodeficiency virus type 1 in vivo. Cichutek K, Merget H, Norley S, Linde R, Kreuz W, Gahr M, Kurth R. Proc Natl Acad Sci U S A. 1992 Aug 15; 89(16):7365-9. PMID 1502146
- Lack of immune suppression in SIV-infected natural hosts. Cichutek K, Norley S. AIDS. 1993; 7 Suppl 1:S25-35. Review. PMID 8395860
- Development of transforming function during transduction of proto-ras into Harvey sarcoma virus. Lang M, Treinies I, Duesberg PH, Kurth R, Cichutek K. Proc Natl Acad Sci U S A. 1994 Jan 18; 91(2):654-8. PMID 8290577
- Pseudotyping of murine leukemia virus with the envelope glycoproteins of HIV generates a retroviral vector with specificity of infection for CD4-expressing cells. Schnierle BS, Stitz J, Bosch V, Nocken F, Merget-Millitzer H, Engelstädter M, Kurth R, Groner B, Cichutek K. Proc Natl Acad Sci U S A. 1997 Aug 5; 94(16):8640-5. PMID 9238030
- The U3 promoter and the nef gene of simian immunodeficiency virus (SIV) smmPBj1.9 do not confer acute pathogenicity upon SIVagm. Wagener S, Dittmar MT, Beer B, König R, Plesker R, Norley S, Kurth R, Cichutek K. J Virol. 1998 Apr; 72(4):3446-50. PMID 9525679
- Retroviral cell targeting vectors. Buchholz CJ, Stitz J, Cichutek K. Curr Opin Mol Ther. 1999 Oct; 1(5):613-21. Review. PMID 11249668
- European Union guidance on the quality, safety and efficacy of DNA vaccines and regulatory requirements. Robertson JS, Cichutek K. Dev Biol (Basel). 2000; 104:53-6. PMID 11713824
- A novel lentivirus vector derived from apathogenic simian immunodeficiency virus. Stitz J, Mühlebach MD, Blömer U, Scherr M, Selbert M, Wehner P, Steidl S, Schmitt I, König R, Schweizer M, Cichutek K. Virology. 2001 Dec 20; 291(2):191-7. DOI:10.1006/viro.2001.1183
- Human CD4+ T lymphocytes recognize a vascular endothelial growth factor receptor-2-derived epitope in association with HLA-DR. Sun Y, Song M, Jäger E, Schwer C, Stevanovic S, Flindt S, Karbach J, Nguyen XD, Schadendorf D, Cichutek K. Clin Cancer Res. 2008 Jul 1; 14(13):4306-15. doi:10.1158/1078-0432.CCR-07-4849.
- Lentiviral vectors with measles virus glycoproteins - dream team for gene transfer? Buchholz CJ, Mühlebach MD, Cichutek K. Trends Biotechnol. 2009 May; 27(5):259-65. doi:10.1016/j.tibtech.2009.02.002. Epub 2009 Mar 25. Review.
- Adherens junction protein nectin-4 is the epithelial receptor for measles virus. Mühlebach MD, Mateo M, Sinn PL, Prüfer S, Uhlig KM, Leonard VH, Navaratnarajah CK, Frenzke M, Wong XX, Sawatsky B, Ramachandran S, McCray PB Jr, Cichutek K, von Messling V, Lopez M, Cattaneo R. Nature. 2011 Nov 2;480(7378):530-3. doi:10.1038/nature10639.
- A global regulatory science agenda for vaccines. Elmgren L, Li X, Wilson C, Ball R, Wang J, Cichutek K, Pfleiderer M, Kato A, Cavaleri M, Southern J, Jivapaisarnpong T, Minor P, Griffiths E, Sohn Y, Wood D. Vaccine. 2013 Apr 18; 31 Suppl 2:B163-75. doi:10.1016/j.vaccine.2012.10.117. Review
- DARPin-targeting of measles virus: unique bispecificity, effective oncolysis, and enhanced safety. Friedrich K, Hanauer JR, Prüfer S, Münch RC, Völker I, Filippis C, Jost C, Hanschmann KM, Cattaneo R, Peng KW, Plückthun A, Buchholz CJ, Cichutek K, Mühlebach MD. Mol Ther. 2013 Apr; 21(4):849-59. doi:10.1038/mt.2013.16. Epub 2013 Feb 5.
- Special considerations for the regulation of biological medicinal products in individualised medicine. More than stratified medicine. Müller-Berghaus J, Volkers P, Scherer J, Cichutek K.Bundesgesundheitsblatt - Gesundheitsforschung - Gesundheitsschutz. 2013 Nov;56(11):1538-44. doi:10.1007/s00103-013-1826-y. German
- A Highly Immunogenic and Protective Middle East Respiratory Syndrome Coronavirus Vaccine Based on a Recombinant Measles Virus Vaccine Platform. Malczyk AH, Kupke A, Prüfer S, Scheuplein VA, Hutzler S, Kreuz D, Beissert T, Bauer S, Hubich-Rau S, Tondera C, Eldin HS, Schmidt J, Vergara-Alert J, Süzer Y, Seifried J, Hanschmann KM, Kalinke U, Herold S, Sahin U, Cichutek K, Waibler Z, Eickmann M, Becker S, Mühlebach MD.J Virol. 2015 Nov; 89(22):11654-67. doi:10.1128/JVI.01815-15. Epub 2015 Sep 9.
- Enhanced lysis by bispecific oncolytic measles viruses simultaneously using HER2/neu or EpCAM as target receptors. Hanauer JR, Gottschlich L, Riehl D, Rusch T, Koch V, Friedrich K, Hutzler S, Prüfer S, Friedel T, Hanschmann KM, Münch RC, Jost C, Plückthun A, Cichutek K, Buchholz CJ, Mühlebach MD. Mol Ther Oncolytics. 2016 Feb 24; 3:16003. doi:10.1038/mto.2016.3 eCollection 2016.
