= Ober-Ramstadt station =

Railway station in Germany

Ober-Ramstadt

General information
- Location: Bahnhofstr. 23, Ober-Ramstadt, Hesse; Germany
- Coordinates: 49°49′55″N 8°44′34″E
- Line: Odenwald railway
- Platforms: 2

Other information
- Station code: 4614
- DS100 code: FORA
- IBNR: 8004497
- Category: 6
- Fare zone: : 4072
- Website: www.bahnhof.de

History
- Opened: 27 December 1870

Services
Preceding station	VIAS	Following station
Darmstadt Ost towards Darmstadt Hbf	RE 80	Reinheim towards Erbach (Odenw)
Mühltal towards Darmstadt Hbf	RB 81	Reinheim towards Eberbach
Mühltal towards Frankfurt (Main) Hbf	RB 82	Reinheim towards Eberbach
Location

Ober-Ramstadt is a railway station in Ober-Ramstadt, Hesse, Germany.

== The station ==
The station is located on the Odenwald railway (Darmstadt – Wiebelsbach) and is served by RB services operated by VIAS.

== Train services ==
The following services currently call at Ober-Ramstadt:

Series	Operator	Route	Material	Frequency	Notes
RE80	VIAS	Darmstadt Hbf - Darmstadt Nord - Darmstadt Ost - Ober-Ramstadt - Reinheim - Groß-Umstadt Wiebelsbach - Höchst (Odenw) - Bad König - Bad König Zell - Michelstadt – Erbach (Odenw)		Every 2 hours	
RB81	VIAS	Darmstadt Hbf - Darmstadt Nord - Darmstadt Ost - Darmstadt TU-Lichtwiese - Mühltal - Ober-Ramstadt - Reinheim - Otzberg Lengfeld - Groß-Umstadt Wiebelsbach - Höchst Hetschbach - Höchst (Odenw) - Höchst Mümling-Grumbach - Bad König - Bad König Zell - Michelstadt - Erbach (Odenw) Nord – Erbach (Odenw) - Beerfelden Hetzbach - Hesseneck Schöllenbach - Hesseneck Kailbach - Eberbach		Every 2 hours	
RB82	VIAS	Frankfurt (Main) Hbf - Darmstadt Nord - Darmstadt Ost - Darmstadt TU-Lichtwiese - Mühltal - Ober-Ramstadt - Reinheim - Otzberg Lengfeld - Groß-Umstadt Wiebelsbach - Höchst Hetschbach - Höchst (Odenw) - Höchst Mümling-Grumbach - Bad König - Bad König Zell - Michelstadt - Erbach (Odenw) Nord – Erbach (Odenw)		Every 2 hours	

== Bus services ==
- K 56
