= Darmstadt Ost station =

Railway station in Darmstadt, Germany

Darmstadt Ost
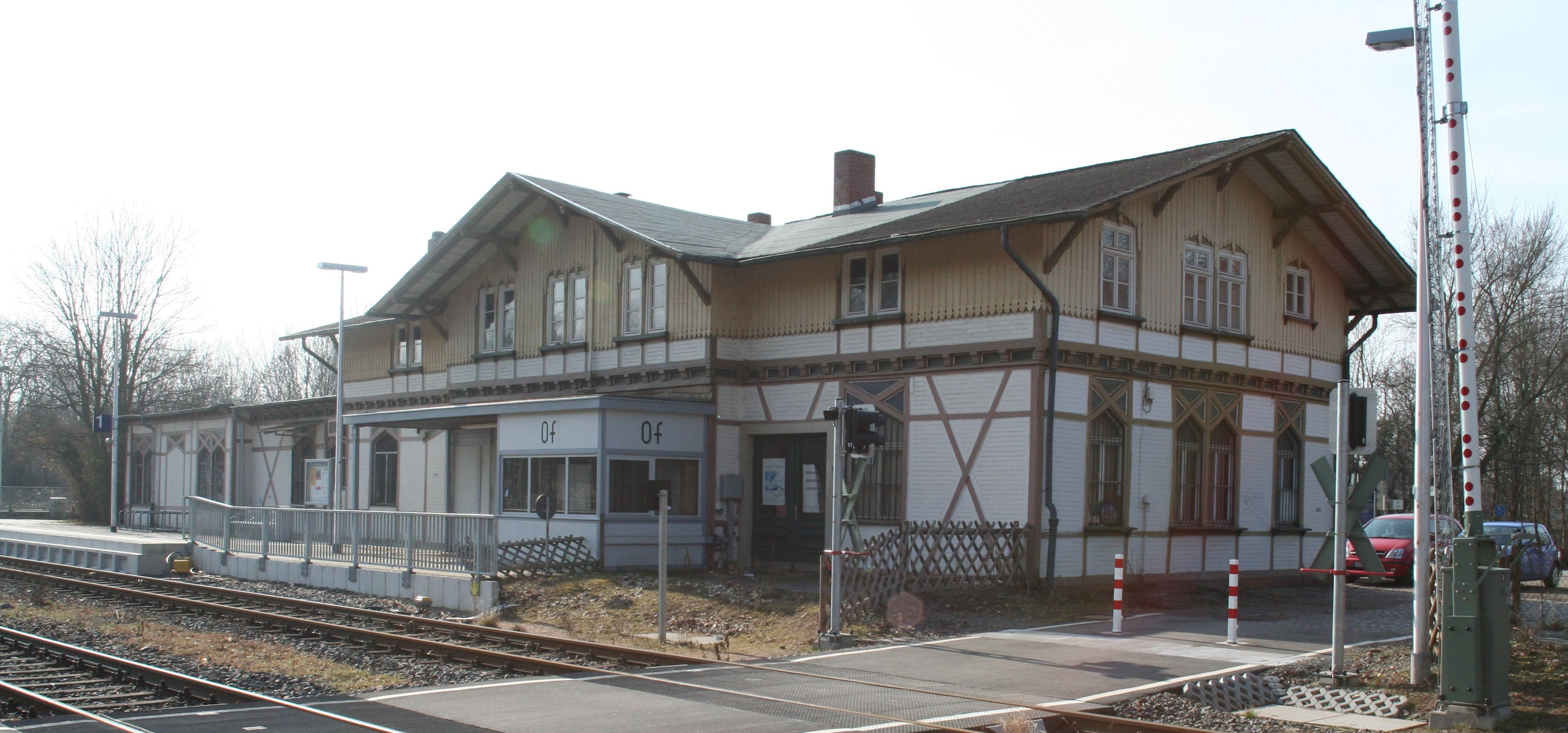
- 2009

General information
- Location: Erbacher Straße 87; 64287 Darmstadt; Hesse; Germany
- Coordinates: 49.8748°N 8.6736°E
- Owner: DB Netz
- Operator: DB Station&Service
- Lines: Odenwald Railway (Hesse) (KBS 641); Darmstadt Ost–Groß-Zimmern railway
- Platforms: 2 side platforms
- Tracks: 2
- Train operators: VIAS

Other information
- Station code: 1128
- DS100 code: FDO
- IBNR: 8001376
- Category: 6
- Fare zone: : 4001
- Website: www.bahnhof.de

History
- Opened: 1869; 157 years ago

Services
Preceding station	VIAS	Following station
Darmstadt Nord towards Darmstadt Hbf	RE 80	Darmstadt TU-Lichtwiese towards Erbach (Odenw)
Darmstadt Nord towards Darmstadt Hbf	RB 81	Darmstadt TU-Lichtwiese towards Eberbach
Darmstadt Nord towards Frankfurt (Main) Hbf	RB 82	Darmstadt TU-Lichtwiese towards Eberbach
Location

Darmstadt Ost station is a railway station in the eastern part of the town of Darmstadt, located in Hesse, Germany.

== Rail services ==
Line	Name	Route
RE 80	Odenwaldbahn	Darmstadt Hauptbahnhof – Darmstadt Ost – Reinheim – Groß-Umstadt Wiebelsbach – Erbach
RB 81	Odenwaldbahn	Darmstadt Hauptbahnhof – Darmstadt Ost – Reinheim – Groß-Umstadt Wiebelsbach – Erbach
RB 82	Odenwaldbahn	Frankfurt Hauptbahnhof – Darmstadt Ost – Reinheim – Groß-Umstadt Wiebelsbach – Erbach – Eberbach
