= Gersprenz Valley Railway =

Railway line in Germany

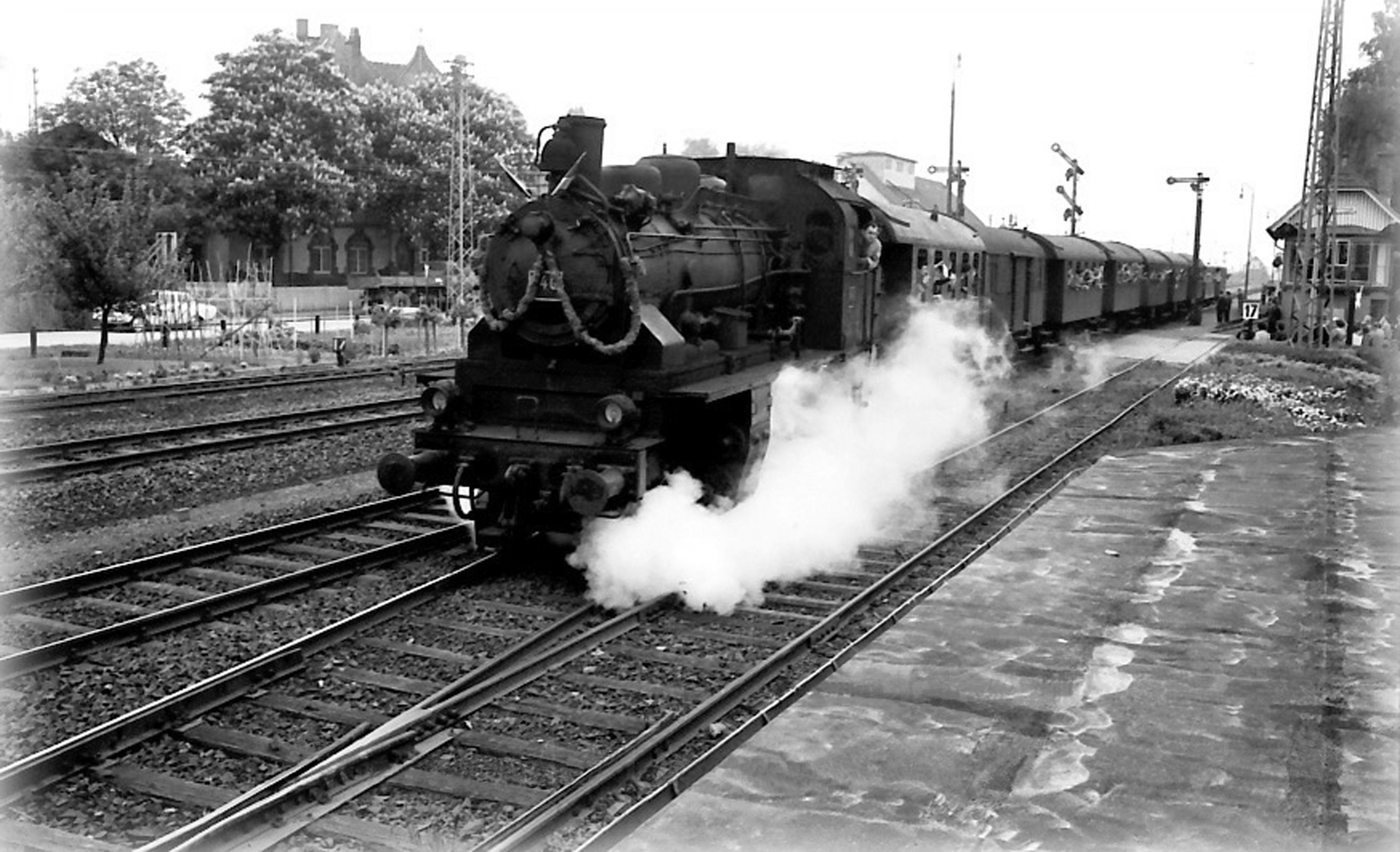
Odenwälder Lieschen

The Gersprenz Valley Railway (German: Gersprenztalbahn) is a defunct railway track in the Gersprenz valley of the Odenwald that was operated until 1963 and ran from Reichelsheim via Fränkisch‐Crumbach, Brensbach, and Groß-Bieberau to Reinheim. Folklore had named the railway Odenwälder Lieschen ("Lisa of the Odenwald" in the diminutive). Rails were dismantled from Bieberau southwards in 1964.

== See also ==
- Odenwaldbahn
