= Odenwald Railway (Hesse) =

Railway line in Germany

Eberbach–Hanau Railway
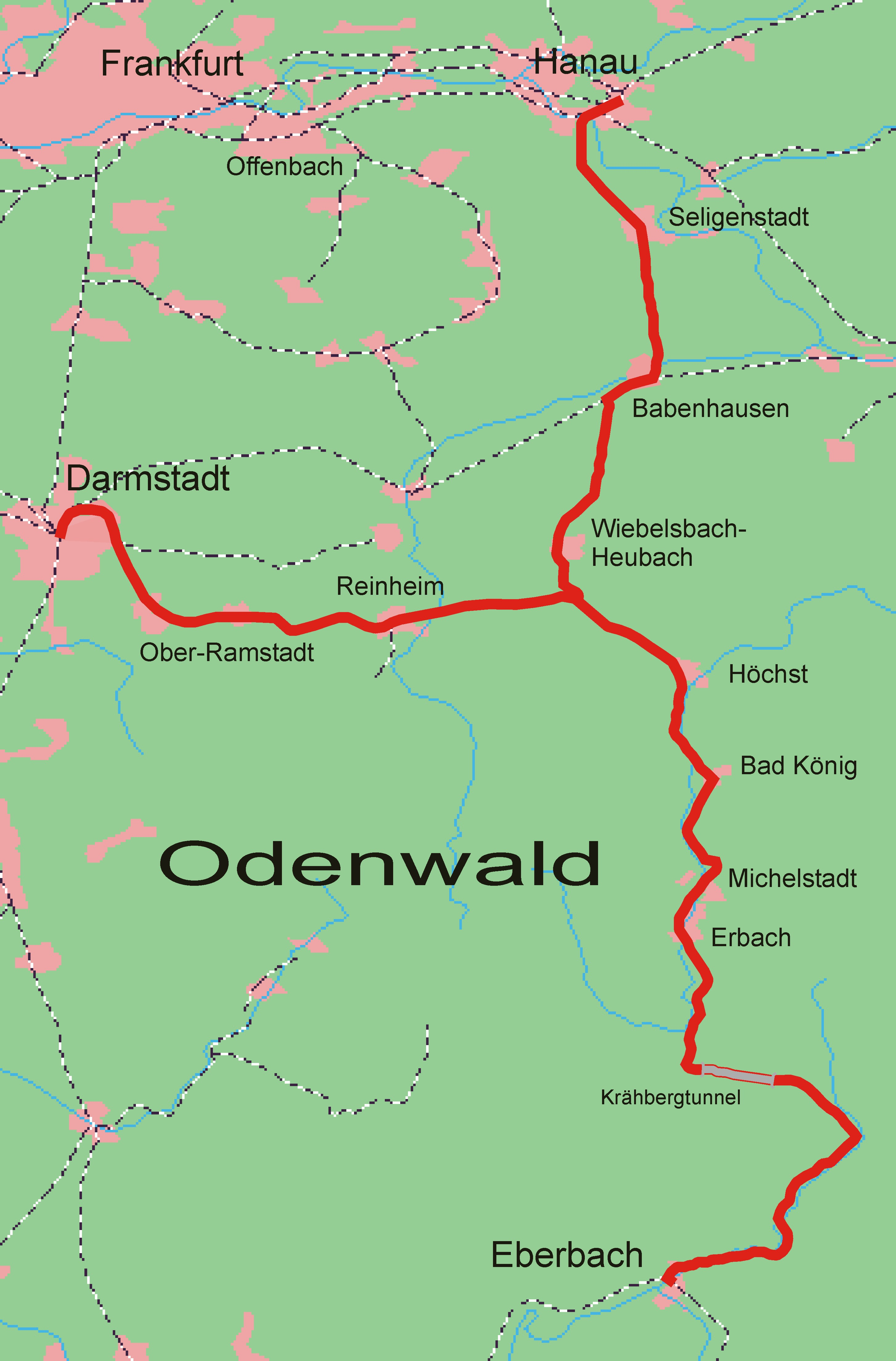

Overview
- Native name: Odenwaldbahn
- Status: Operational
- Owner: Deutsche Bahn
- Line number: 4113
- Locale: Baden-Württemberg; Hesse
- Termini: Eberbach; Hanau Hauptbahnhof
- Stations: 22

Service
- Type: Heavy rail, Passenger rail Regional rail
- Route number: 641
- Operator(s): VIAS
- Rolling stock: Bombardier Itino, Alstom Coradia LINT

History
- Opened: Stages between 1870–1882

Technical
- Line length: 88.7 km (55.1 mi)
- Number of tracks: Single track
- Track gauge: 1,435 mm (4 ft 8 1/2 in) standard gauge
- Operating speed: 120 km/h (75 mph)
- Maximum incline: <2.0%

Darmstadt–Wiebelsbach Railway

Overview
- Native name: Odenwaldbahn
- Status: Operational
- Owner: Deutsche Bahn
- Line number: 3554
- Locale: Hesse
- Termini: Darmstadt Hauptbahnhof; Groß-Umstadt Wiebelsbach
- Stations: 9

Service
- Type: Heavy rail, Passenger rail Regional rail
- Route number: 641
- Operator(s): VIAS
- Rolling stock: Bombardier Itino

History
- Opened: Stages between 1870–1871

Technical
- Line length: 28.9 km (18.0 mi)
- Number of tracks: Single track
- Track gauge: 1,435 mm (4 ft 8 1/2 in) standard gauge
- Operating speed: 120 km/h (75 mph)
- Maximum incline: <2.0%

The Odenwald Railway (German: Odenwaldbahn) is a mainly single-tracked main line from Darmstadt and Hanau to Eberbach on the River Neckar, which crosses the Odenwald mountains in the German states of Hesse and Baden-Württemberg. Since 1882 the route has been operated throughout as a standard gauge line and since 2005 has been worked by diesel multiples owned by the VIAS private railway company.

The line is timetable no. KBS 641. To distinguish it from the Odenwald Railway in Baden from Heidelberg to Würzburg it is also known as the Hessian Odenwald Railway (Hessische Odenwaldbahn) and occasionally as the Mümling Railway (Mümlingbahn), because it follows the valley of the same name from Beerfelden Hetzbach to Höchst im Odenwald.

== History ==
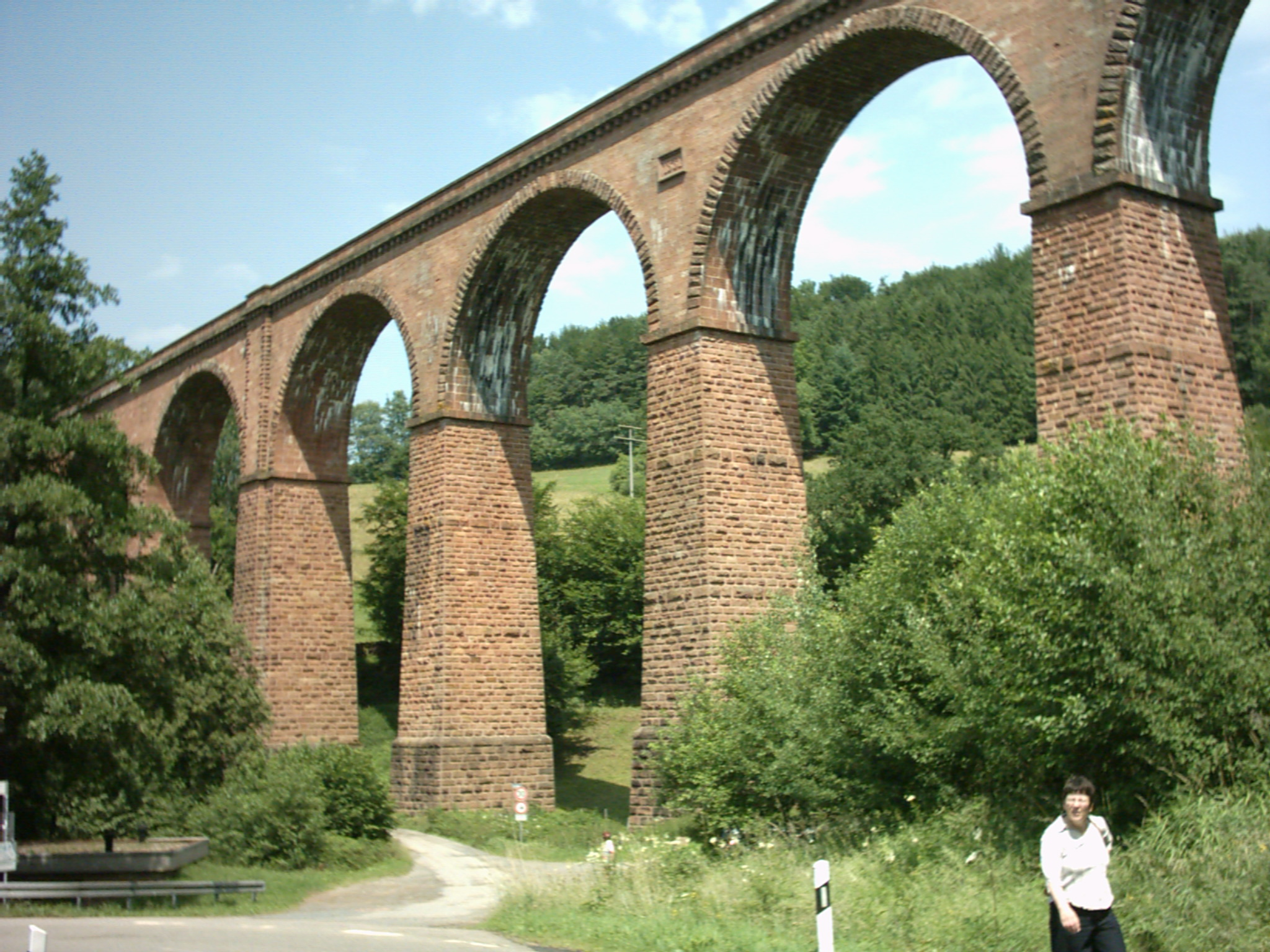
Himbächel viaduct

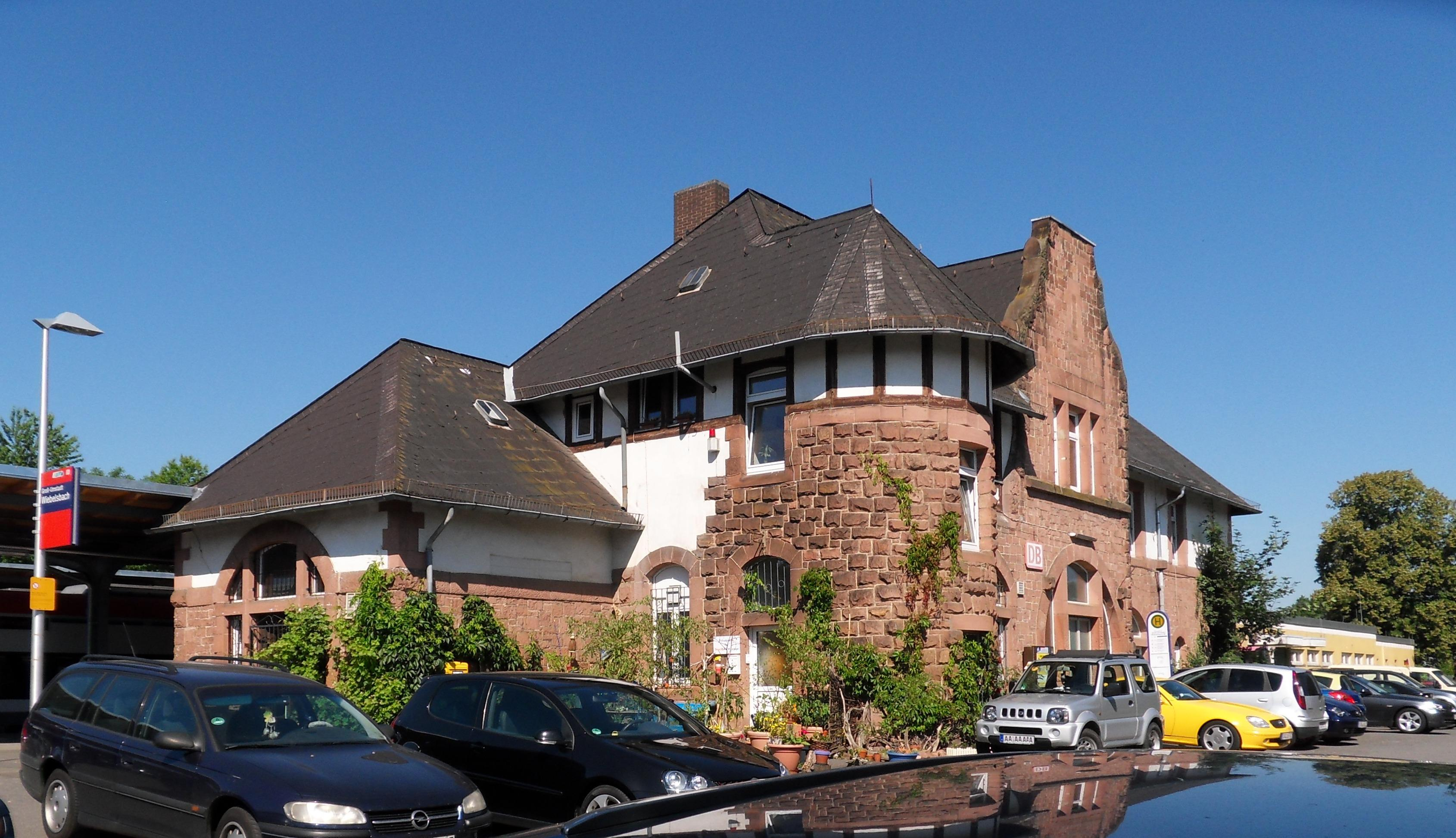
Groß-Umstadt Wiebelsbach station, node of the Odenwald Railway

=== Planning and construction ===
During the 1860s there were many years of controversy over the route. Darmstadt, the capital city of the Grand Duchy of Hesse (Hesse-Darmstadt) supported a route through the Gersprenz valley through Reinheim, Brensbach, Hollerbach and the Kinzig and the Mümling valleys. Frankfurt instead supported route through Dieburg. As a compromise, the route as later built was chosen. It runs from Eberbach through the Odenwald via Wiebelbach-Heubach, where it branches, with one branch running to Babenhausen and Hanau Central Station (Hauptbahnhof) and the other branch to Reinheim and Darmstadt. This meant that traffic from the Odenwald ran to Darmstadt rather than bypassing it.

The Hessian Ludwig Railway (Hessische Ludwigsbahn) received the concession for the Odenwald Railway in the summer of 1868 and financed its construction by raising public debt of over 4 million thalers. It was constructed as a single-track main-line railway of standard gauge, crossing the Odenwald in southern Hesse and northern Baden-Württemberg. In September 1868, construction began on the 1,205 m long tunnel near Frau-Nauses between Wiebelbach and Höchst im Odenwald in the Mümling valley. This cost the life of eleven people and was finished at the Christmas of 1870. In Darmstadt, work began on 1 February 1869 and progressed quickly towards Reinheim. The line was opened to Ober-Ramstadt on 28 December 1870, to Reinheim on 15 May 1871 and to Wiebelbach-Heubach two months later. On 23 December 1871 the section to Erbach was opened, having been delayed by a collapse in the Frau-Nauses tunnel.

The branch line between Hanau and Wiebelbach-Heubach was opened between Babenhausen and Wiebelbach-Heubach in two sections in 1870 and between Hanau and Babenhausen in 1882. The Odenwald Railway crosses the Rhine-Main Railway in Babenhausen.

The Hessian Ludwig Railway received a concession from the Grand Duchy of Hesse to build the 31 km southern section of the line through the Grand Duchy of Baden on 3 August 1875; the Baden section of the line was authorised by a treaty between the two grand duchies that had been signed on 3 August 1874. Because the line had to overcome the topography over the watershed between the Main and Neckar, many engineering structures were required between Erbach and Eberbach, including the Himbächel Viaduct and the Krähberg Tunnel, as well as gradients of 1 in 70. On 1 March 1882, the 23 km long Erbach–Hetzbach section running through the Krähberg Tunnel was opened. On 27 May, this was followed by the opening of the last section from Eberbach to Hetzbach, first for passenger traffic and five days later for freight, making the Odenwald Railway operable along its entire length. Originally, it had been planned to complete the line in 1879, coinciding with the opening of the Neckar Valley Railway from Neckargemünd to the Jagst river, but due to the stretched financial situation of the Hessian Ludwig Railway Company, this schedule could not be met. Passenger trains took two hours to run over the 56 km route between Darmstadt and Erbach in 1871.

=== Development ===
==== Additional infrastructure ====
A number of additions and connections to different lines were connected to the Odenwald Railway over the years:

- On 10 October 1887 the Gersprenz Valley Railway (Gersprenztalbahn) to Reichelsheim connected to the Odenwald Railway in Reinheim.
- On 1 October 1896, the Rodgau Railway (Rodgaubahn) was opened from Reinheim via Dieburg to Offenbach.
- The Überwald Railway ("upper forest railway" or Überwaldbahn) was an attempt to create a lateral connection between the Bergstraße Route and the Odenwald Railway. The Überwald Railway was opened in 1901 from Weinheim to Wahlen (now in the municipality of Grasellenbach), where this ambitious attempt ended because of the cost of crossing the mountains and eventually reaching the Odenwald Railway could not be financed.
- On 1 May 1904, the branch line to Beerfelden was opened.
- On 1 October 1908, Zellhausen station, which was not originally planned, opened after the local community had asked for a connection to the network.
- On 1 December 1912 the Bachgau Railway (Bachgaubahn) was opened between Höchst and Aschaffenburg.

==== Traffic ====
From 1925 the Odenwald Railway was served by local services as well as three “hedgerow expresses” (Heckeneilzug), from Frankfurt via Hanau, Erbach and Eberbach, connecting with Stuttgart and during some timetable periods in the 1980s even corridor express (D-Zug) trains. These changed from electric to diesel locomotives originally in Heilbronn and later in Eberbach. The travel time between Frankfurt and Stuttgart was 3.5 hours and between Frankfurt and Erbach about 85 minutes.

=== Dismantling of the infrastructure ===
In the 1970s, the Odenwald Railway began large scale closures. Zeilhard, Richen, Etzen-Gesäß, Schönnen, Ebersberg and Gaimühle stations were closed and Hetzbach, Kailbach, Klein-Umstadt and Langstadt stations were rebuilt as halts (Haltepunkten, that is they now had all sets of points removed). In the 30 kilometres between Erbach and Eberbach there are now no junctions. The branch lines were partly closed:

- Gersprenz Valley Railway in May 1964
- the Hetzbach–Beerfelden line on 23 June 1964
- the southern section of the Rodgau Railway on 20 July 1965
- The Bachgau Railway on 26 May 1974, although the first section of track continued to be used as a siding for the local industry, especially to the Pirelli tyre factory.

At times, it was even considered abandoning the mountainous line between Erbach and Eberbach completely. This did not happen, however, and the services began stopping at Kailbach and Schöllenbach stations again from 1994, after they had been closed in 1977.

=== Operations ===
After the Second World War, class 65 steam locomotive were used on almost all trains. They were used because their technical characteristics (including tractive effort) was very suitable for the Odenwald line. Passengers trains were mostly composed of three-axle carriages rebuilt from compartmentised carriages. Freight trains were often hauled by class 50 locomotives; in some cases freight traffic was carried between Hanau and Wiebelbach in railbus sets. All locomotives were based in Darmstadt. In 1970, steam operations ended on the Odenwald line and train services were hauled by diesel locomotives of class 212. At the beginning of the 1990s, class 628 diesel multiple units were increasingly operated on the line, while the remaining locomotive-hauled trains, which had been hauled by class 212 diesel locomotives, was gradually replaced by class 216 hauled trains. In the late nineties, these were replaced first by class 215 locomotives, which after a short time were transferred to other regions, and then by class 218 locomotives. The locomotive-hauled trains often ran as push-pull trains.

Deutsche Bahn abandoned freight services in 2001. Through passenger services between Frankfurt and Stuttgart were terminated in December 2004 when Baden-Württemberg refused to support them.

Passenger trains on the 56 km route between Darmstadt and Erbach took 1 hour and 17 minutes in 1982; in 2004 they took 1 hour and 10 minutes, which corresponded to an average speed of 48 km/h.

== Current railway ==
=== Modernisation of the infrastructure ===
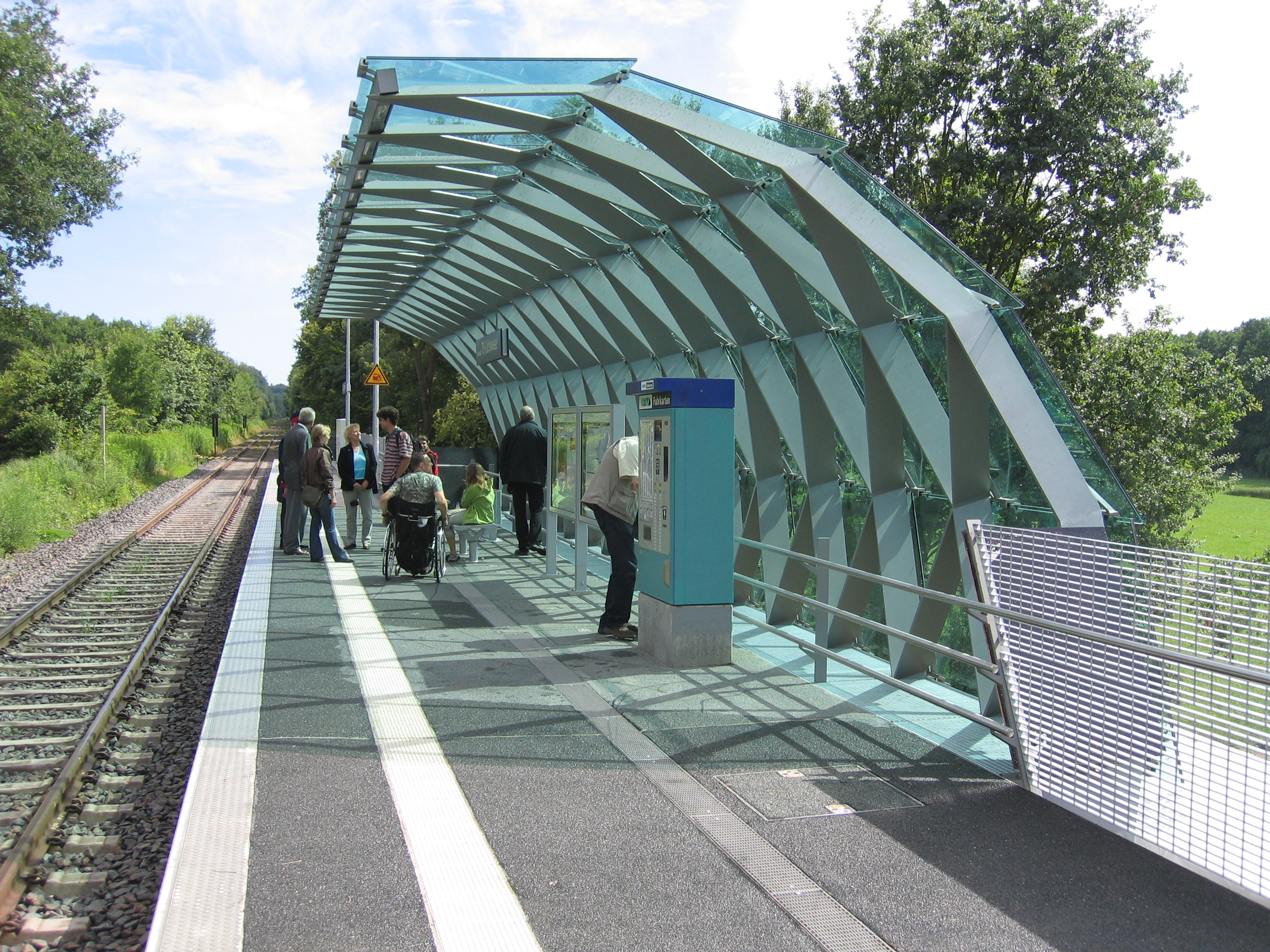
Opening of TU Lichtwiese station

Around 2005 was the infrastructure of the Odenwald Railway was upgraded at considerable cost. The line speed was increased in some places from 90 to 120 km/h and the predominant semaphore signals were replaced by colour light signals controlled from a central control panel at Groß-Umstadt Wiebelsbach station. At several stations (Darmstadt Ost, Ober-Ramstadt, Reinheim, Wiebelsbach, Groß-Umstadt) access to the trains were improved with new platforms. In Darmstadt Nord, a new track connection was built allowing a direct journey to Frankfurt over the Main-Neckar Railway and a new station was opened at the new campus of the Technical University of Darmstadt, called Darmstadt TU-Lichtwiese.

In the course of modernisation at the timetable change of December 2005, some station names were changed to reflect changes in place names as a result of the municipal reform in Hesse in 1974:

Operating status	since 2006	until 2005
station	Groß-Umstadt Mitte	Groß Umstadt
halt	Groß-Umstadt Klein-Umstadt	Klein Umstadt
halt	Babenhausen Langstadt	Langstadt
halt	Mainhausen Zellhausen	Zellhausen
station	Hainburg Hainstadt	Hainstadt (Kr Offenbach)
halt	Hanau Klein-Auheim	Klein Auheim
station	Groß-Umstadt Wiebelsbach	Wiebelsbach-Heubach
halt	Höchst Hetschbach	Hetschbach
station	Höchst Mümling-Grumbach	Mümling-Grumbach
station	Bad König Zell	Zell-Kirchbrombach
halt	Beerfelden Hetzbach	Hetzbach
halt	Hesseneck Schöllenbach	Schöllenbach-Hesselbach
halt	Hesseneck Kailbach	Kailbach
halt	Otzberg Lengfeld	Lengfeld
halt	Mühltal	Nieder Ramstadt-Traisa

The local transport plan for 2011-2016 includes new stations in the Darmstadt-Dieburg district and new stations in Groß-Umstadt are also being considering.

=== Operations ===
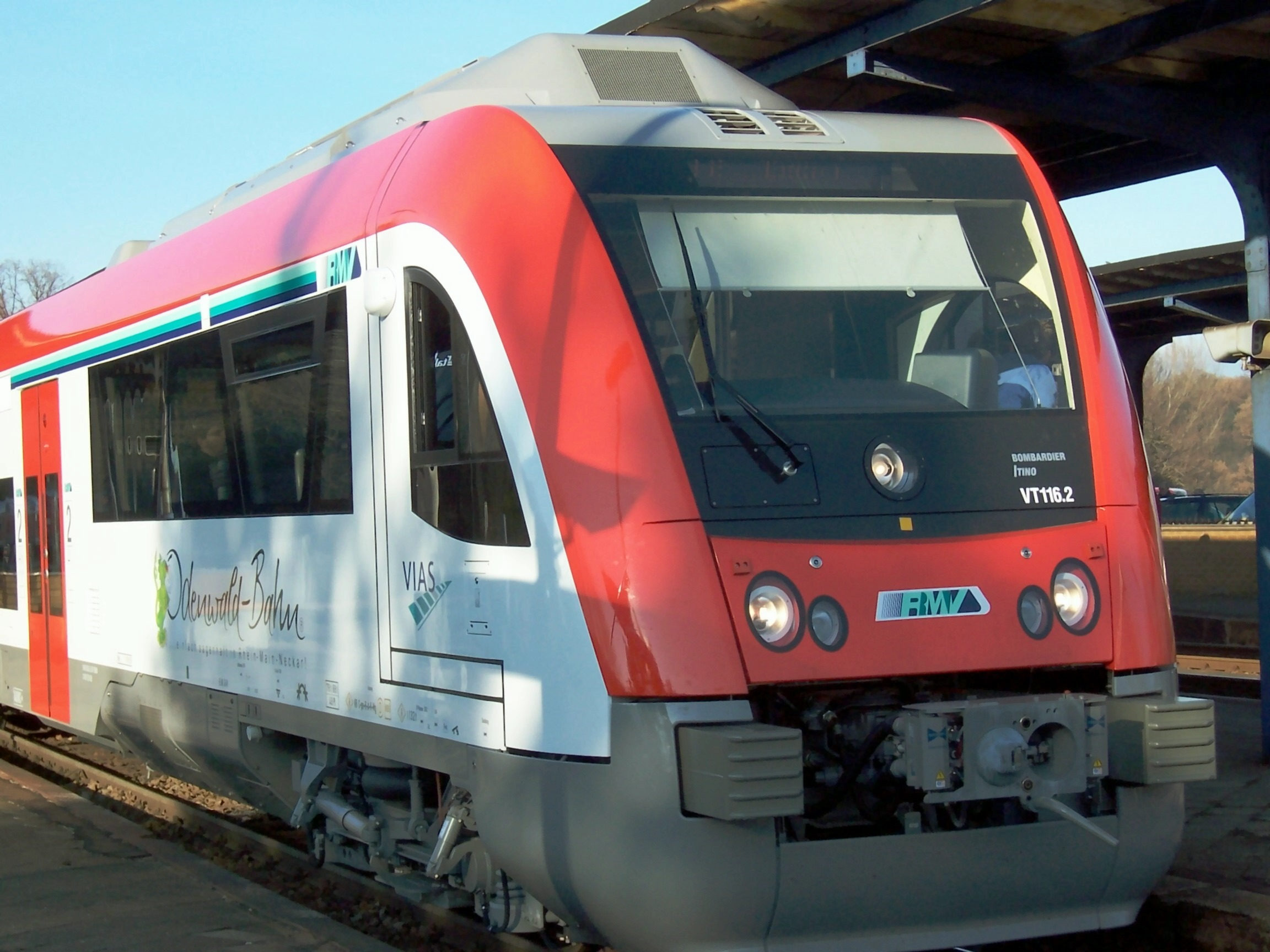
Itino on the Odenwald Railway

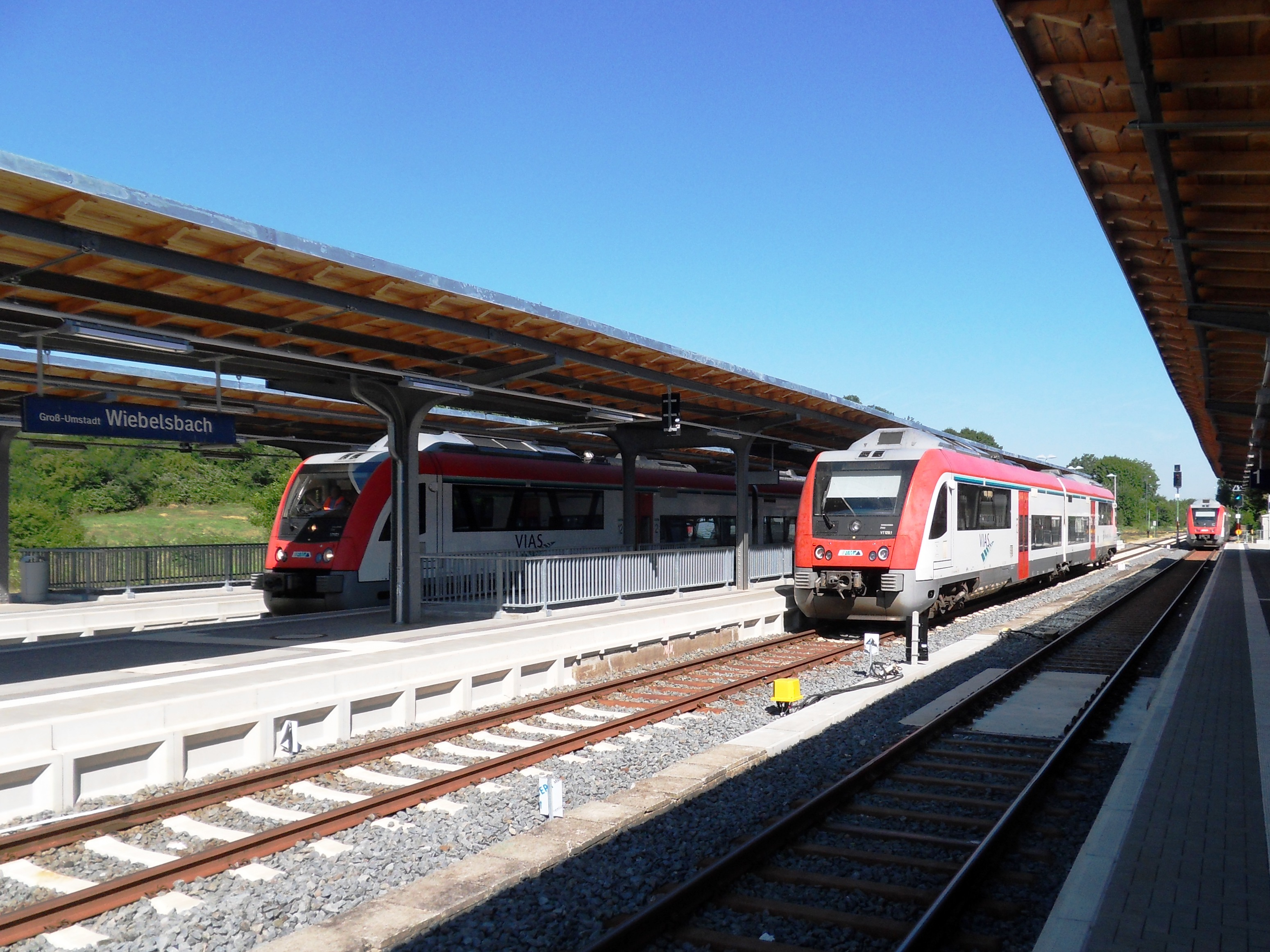
Platforms in Groß-Umstadt Wiebelsbach

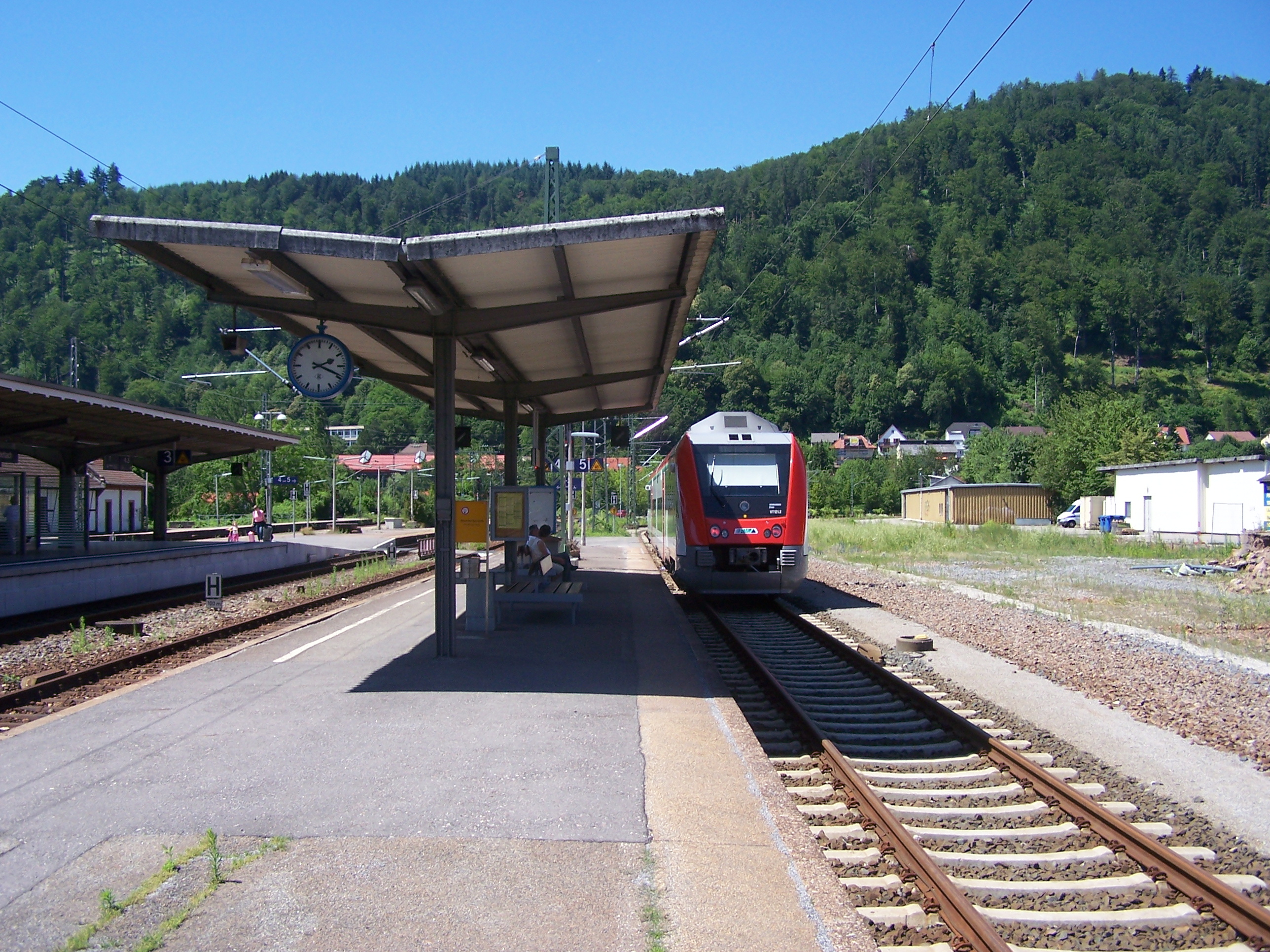
Eberbach, most southern station of the Odenwald Railway

Since the timetable change on 11 December 2005, the passenger services on the Odenwald Railway have been operated by the VIAS company, using two-carriage Bombardier Itino DMUs, which are owned by Fahrzeugmanagement Region Frankfurt RheinMain GmbH (fahma). The platform length of 120 metres on the line restricts services to a maximum of three sets coupled together. However, the originally tendered 22 sets are not enough to provide sufficient capacity on all services. So as a result of bottlenecks especially during peak hours, passenger growth on the new direct services has been low. Therefore, in 2007, four more Itino sets were ordered. These were approved for service in February 2010 and have increased the fleet to 26 sets.

=== Rail services ===
The following Rhein-Main-Verkehrsverbund services are operated:

Category and No.	Route	Operator
RE 80	Darmstadt Hbf – Reinheim (Odenw) – Groß-Umstadt Wiebelsbach – Erbach (Odenw)	VIAS (until 2005 DB Regio)
RB 81	Darmstadt Hbf – Reinheim (Odenw) – Groß-Umstadt Wiebelsbach – Erbach (Odenw) – Eberbach	VIAS (until 2005 DB Regio)
RB 82	Frankfurt (Main) Hbf – Darmstadt Nord – Reinheim (Odenw) - Groß-Umstadt Wiebelsbach – Erbach (Odenw)	VIAS (new since 2005)
RE 85	Frankfurt (Main) Hbf – Hanau Hbf – Groß-Umstadt Wiebelsbach (– Eberbach)	VIAS (until 2005 DB Regio)
RB 86	Hanau Hbf – Groß-Umstadt Wiebelsbach	VIAS (until 2005 DB Regio)

Since the timetable change on 11 December 2005, direct services are able to run from the Odenwald Railway on the new rail link north of Darmstadt to Frankfurt. This service is operated hourly from Erbach to Frankfurt, via Frankfurt Central Station, Offenbach Central Station, Hanau Central Station and then on to Erbach (and vice versa), with a short stop and reversal in Frankfurt Central Station. Some of these trains travel in the peak with three sets coupled. The journey from Erbach to Frankfurt via Darmstadt now take about 88 minutes.

When the trains run through Babenhausen there are interchanges on the Rhine-Main Railway to Darmstadt and Aschaffenburg. Since the timetable change of 2005, connections on Sundays and public holidays are no longer matched, causing longer waiting times.

There are currently no freight operations on the Odenwald Railway.

Since December 2011, some services running to Darmstadt continue to Pfungstadt on the Pfungstadt Railway.

== Cultural significance ==
The line for its whole length is listed as a historic landmark under the Hessian Monument Protection Act. Its whole length of 120 km, especially its southern part, is very scenic: between Erbach and Eberbach it runs across a mountain range with many engineering structures. The Himbächel viaduct with a total length of 250 m and a maximum height of 40 m and the Haintal viaduct with a length of 173 m and two 60 m long viaducts over the Rindengrund and the kurze Tal ("short valley") are the most impressive viaducts. The line has three tunnels: the 240-metre-long Engelberg tunnel at Reinheim, the 1,205 m long tunnel near Frau-Nauses, both 8 m wide in preparation for a second track, and the Krähberg tunnel with a length of 3,100 m. At the top of the Mümling valley the line has its maximum grade of 1:70 and its smallest curve radius of 300 m.

The railway was a tourist attraction from the beginning. It was travelled over by the Grand Duke Ludwig of Hesse and his wife, Princess Alice of the United Kingdom, accompanied by the Count of Erbach-Schönberg and their guest, Prince Arthur, Duke of Connaught and Strathearn, a brother of the Duchess, in early 1872, on the way to Lauterbach.
