= Reinheim station =

Railway station in Reinheim, Germany

Reinheim (Odenw)
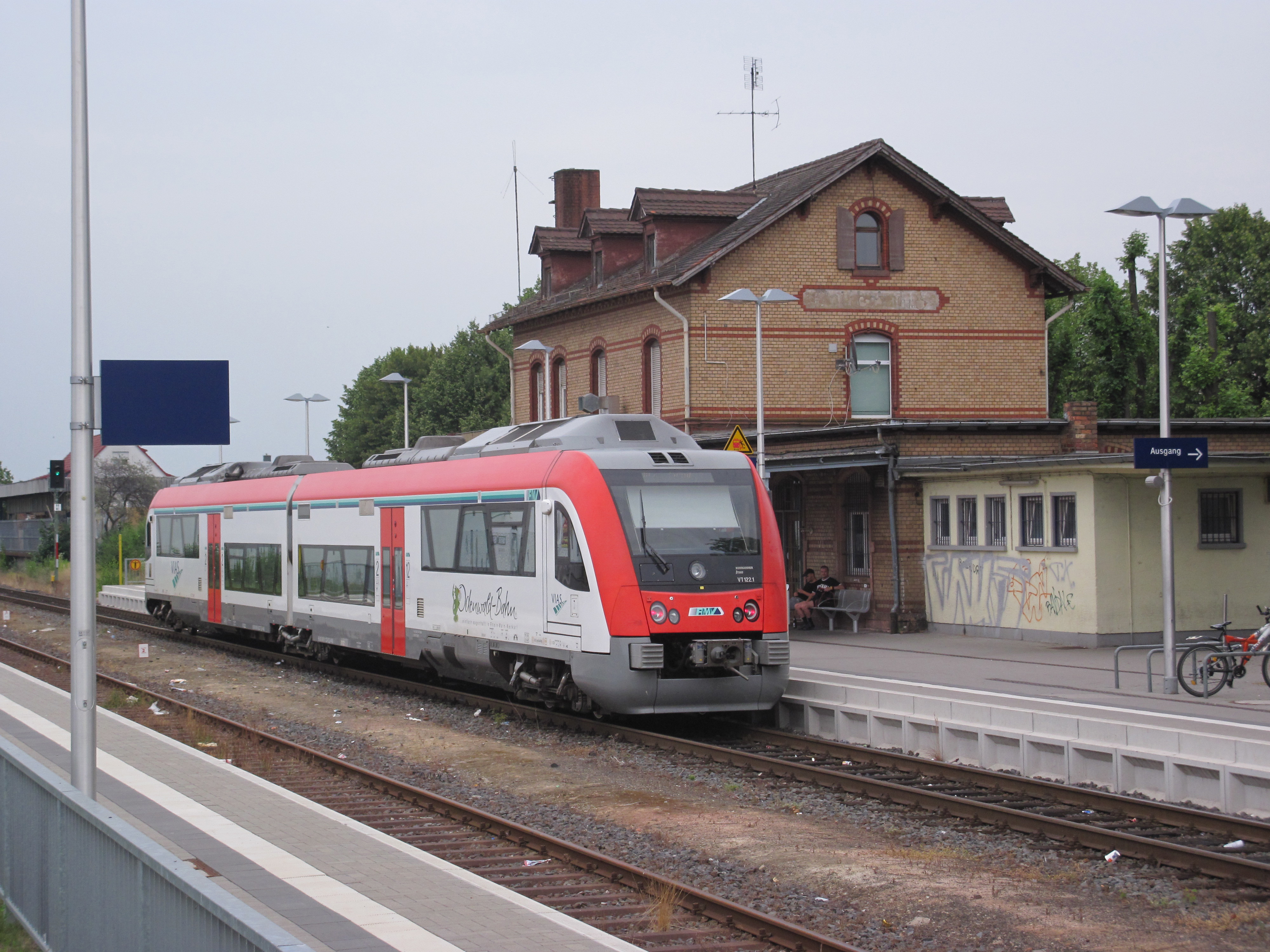

General information
- Location: Bahnhofstr. 16, Reinheim, Hesse; Germany
- Coordinates: 49°49′46″N 8°50′7″E
- Owner: DB Netz
- Operator: DB Station&Service
- Line: Odenwald railway
- Platforms: 3
- Train operators: VIAS

Other information
- Station code: 5203
- DS100 code: FREI
- IBNR: 8005020
- Category: 6
- Fare zone: : 4158
- Website: www.bahnhof.de

History
- Opened: 15 May 1871

Services
Preceding station	VIAS	Following station
Ober-Ramstadt towards Darmstadt Hbf	RE 80	Groß-Umstadt Wiebelsbach towards Erbach (Odenw)
Ober-Ramstadt towards Darmstadt Hbf	RB 81	Otzberg Lengfeld towards Eberbach
Ober-Ramstadt towards Frankfurt (Main) Hbf	RB 82	Otzberg Lengfeld towards Eberbach
Location
- Location within Hesse

Reinheim is a railway station in Reinheim, Hesse, Germany.

== History ==
The station was opened on 15 May 1871, and was a terminus until Wiebelsbach railway station was opened on 15 July 1871. In 2007, the station was renovated at a cost of €900,000.

== The station ==
The station is located on the Odenwald railway (Darmstadt – Wiebelsbach) and is served by RB services operated by VIAS.

== Train services ==
The following services currently call at Reinheim:

Series	Operator	Route	Material	Frequency	Notes
RE80	VIAS	Darmstadt Hbf - Darmstadt Nord - Darmstadt Ost - Ober-Ramstadt - Reinheim - Groß-Umstadt Wiebelsbach - Höchst (Odenw) - Bad König - Bad König Zell - Michelstadt – Erbach (Odenw)		Every 2 hours	
RB81	VIAS	Darmstadt Hbf - Darmstadt Nord - Darmstadt Ost - Darmstadt TU-Lichtwiese - Mühltal - Ober-Ramstadt - Reinheim - Otzberg Lengfeld - Groß-Umstadt Wiebelsbach - Höchst Hetschbach - Höchst (Odenw) - Höchst Mümling-Grumbach - Bad König - Bad König Zell - Michelstadt - Erbach (Odenw) Nord – Erbach (Odenw) - Beerfelden Hetzbach - Hesseneck Schöllenbach - Hesseneck Kailbach - Eberbach		Every 2 hours	
RB82	VIAS	Frankfurt (Main) Hbf - Darmstadt Nord - Darmstadt Ost - Darmstadt TU-Lichtwiese - Mühltal - Ober-Ramstadt - Reinheim - Otzberg Lengfeld - Groß-Umstadt Wiebelsbach - Höchst Hetschbach - Höchst (Odenw) - Höchst Mümling-Grumbach - Bad König - Bad König Zell - Michelstadt - Erbach (Odenw) Nord – Erbach (Odenw)		Every 2 hours	
