= Aschaffenburg–Höchst (Odenwald) railway =

Railway line in Germany

Overview
- Line number: 5222

Service
- Route number: 556

Technical
- Line length: 30 km (18.6 mi)

The Aschaffenburg−Höchst (Odenwald) railway was a single-tracked, Bavarian branch line in southern Germany, running from Aschaffenburg to the Odenwald railway at Höchst im Odenwald. Because the railway ran through the Bachgau, it was also known as the Bachgaubahn ("Bachgau railway").

== History ==
The 30 kilometre long railway was built under the terms of the Lokalbahn law of 12 July 1906 and a state treaty between the Kingdom of Bavaria and the Grand Duchy of Hesse. On 1 May 1911 the first section between Aschaffenburg-Süd und Großostheim was taken into service; 18 months later, on 1 December 1912, the rest of the line to Höchst was opened.

In 1973 the Minister for Transport authorised the closure of the line as part of the package of savings measures proposed by the Deutsche Bundesbahn.

On 25 May 1974 passenger trains ran for the last time and all traffic between Großostheim and Neustadt was ceased. In the following weeks and months the tracks were lifted on the stretch between Großostheim and Neustadt and the 5 kilometre long section between Neustadt and Höchst placed under the Frankfurt railway division Services ceased here at the end of 1992 and the line was dismantled in 1999.

Goods traffic between Aschaffenburg-Nilkheim and Großostheim came to an end on 28 September 1991 and the remaining section of line with its siding to the Port of Aschaffenburg was converted operationally into a station track.

== Present state of the trackbed ==
In the Großostheim districts of Wenigumstadt and Pflaumheim the former trackbed has been a protected site since 1997.

The most striking structure on the route, the viaduct over the village of Höchst, still exists and continues to dominate the local scene. The former locomotive shed at Höchst station is nowadays a private residence. Further on, sections of the old track are still visible as far as Neustadt. Between Neustadt and Hainstadt, the former railway embankment and a bridge can be made out. The station building in Sandbach is also a private property.

On the old station yard at Sandbach the firm of Pirelli has built a workshop and on the former trackbed there is now a link road between the two tyre factories. Houses and a supermarket have been built on the old station yard in Neustadt. At the beginning of spring 2008 the tracks between the Höchster viaduct and Sandbach were completely removed and the old level crossing filled in with concrete.

== Look into the future ==
Local public transport services are being expanded by private initiatives in view of the future economic development of the Odenwald area. Wolfram Alster, the former head of the now-disbanded Überwaldbahn has indicated that a reactivation of the Bachgaubahn would be possible.

== Sources ==
- Andreas Kuhfahl: Nebenbahnen in Unterfranken . Eisenbahn-Fachbuchverlag Neustadt/Coburg, 2003. ISBN 3-9805967-9-6
- Alois Ott, Hans H. Weber: Verkehrseinrichtungen der Gemeinde Wenigumstadt. In: Wenigumstadt – Beiträge zur Geschichte einer Bachgaugemeinde. Wenigumstadt 1977.
- Frank Schmelz: Lineare anthropogene Gehölz- und Saumstrukturen im Bachgau (Gmde. Großostheim, Lkrs. Aschaffenburg), Gießen 2001,
