= Groß-Umstadt Wiebelsbach station =

Railway station in Groß-Umstadt, Germany

Groß-Umstadt Wiebelsbach
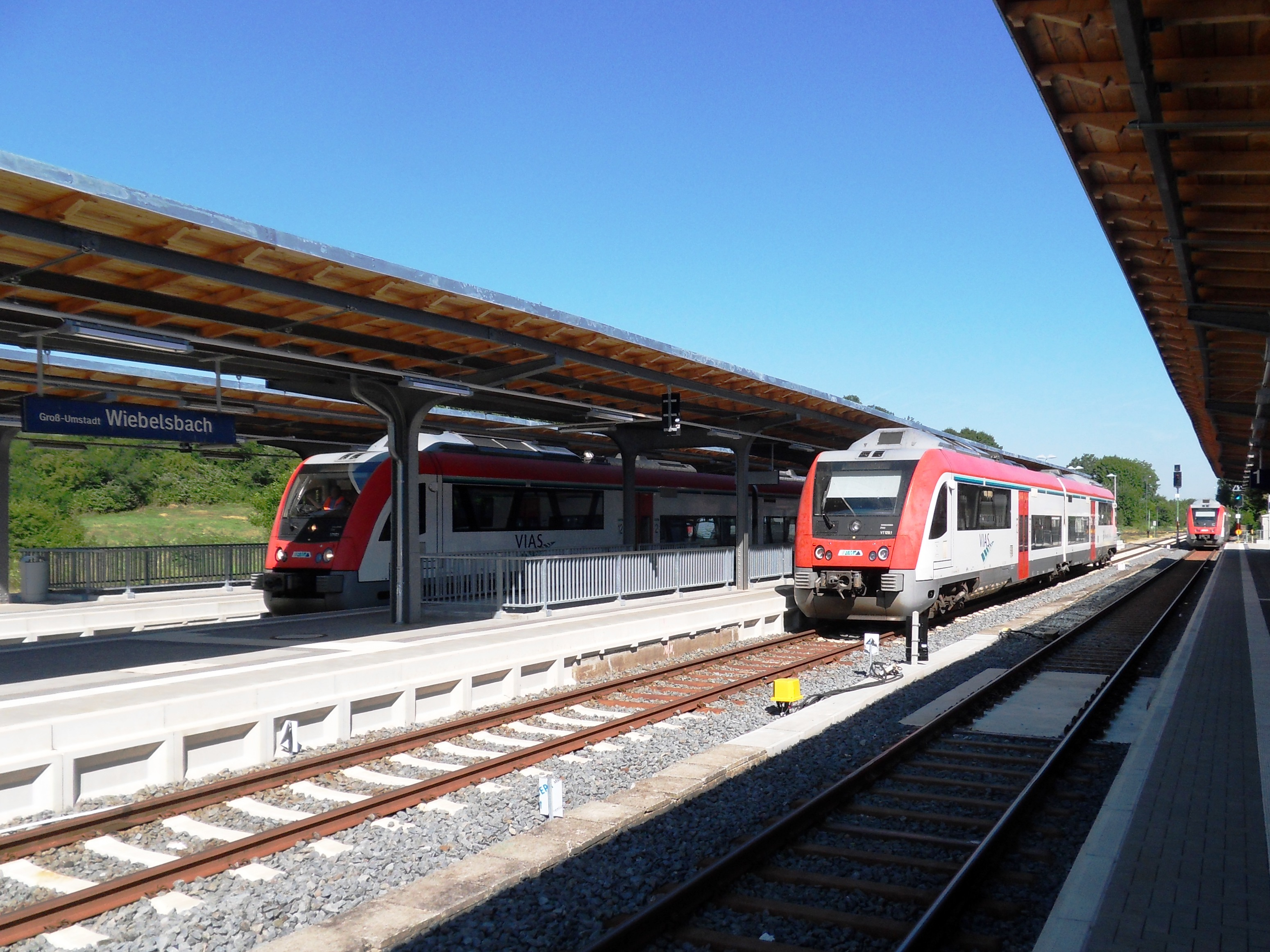

General information
- Location: Bei den Stochwiesen 26; Groß-Umstadt, Hesse; Germany
- Coordinates: 49°49′59″N 8°56′27″E
- Owner: DB Netz
- Operator: DB Station&Service
- Lines: Darmstadt–Groß Umstadt (68.2 km) (KBS 641); Hanau–Eberbach (53.1 km) (KBS 641)
- Platforms: 4
- Train operators: VIAS

Other information
- Station code: 2303
- DS100 code: FWH
- IBNR: 8000384
- Category: 5
- Fare zone: : 4101
- Website: www.bahnhof.de

History
- Opened: 27 December 1870

Services
Preceding station	VIAS	Following station
Reinheim (Odenw) towards Darmstadt Hbf	RE 80	Höchst (Odenw) towards Erbach (Odenw)
Otzberg Lengfeld towards Darmstadt Hbf	RB 81	Höchst Hetschbach towards Eberbach
Otzberg Lengfeld towards Frankfurt (Main) Hbf	RB 82	Höchst Hetschbach towards Eberbach
Groß-Umstadt Mitte towards Frankfurt (Main) Hbf	RE 85	Höchst (Odenw) towards Groß-Umstadt-Wiebelsbach
Groß-Umstadt Mitte towards Hanau Hbf	RB 86	Terminus
Location
- Location within Hesse

Groß-Umstadt Wiebelsbach station is a station on the Odenwald Railway (German: Odenwaldbahn) in the town of Groß-Umstadt in the German state of Hesse. The station is classified by Deutsche Bahn as a category 5 station. The Odenwald Railway running from Eberbach branches at the station towards Darmstadt and Hanau. The station is located in the area administered by the Rhein-Main-Verkehrsverbund (Rhine-Main Transport Association, RMV).

== History ==
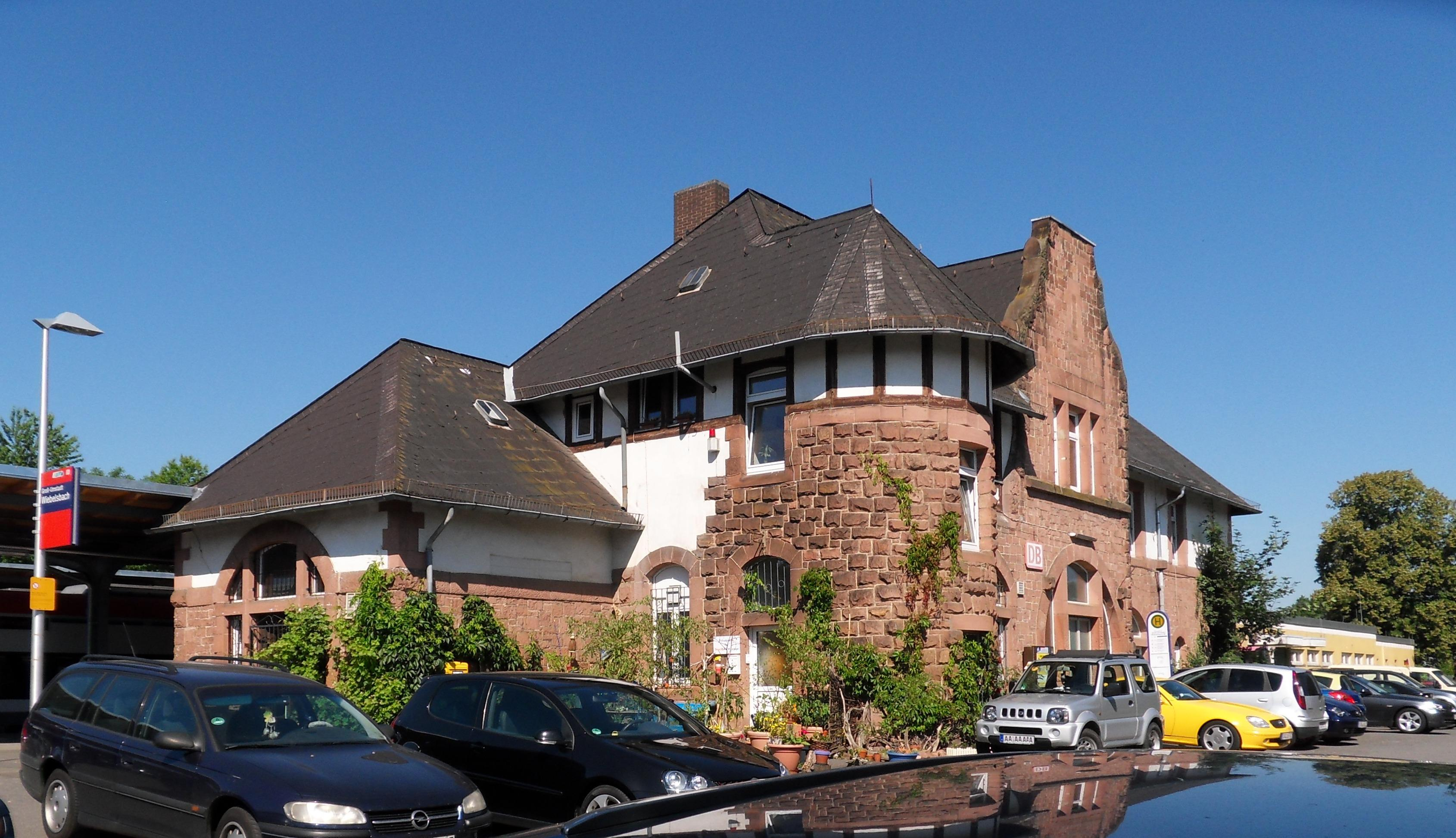
Station building

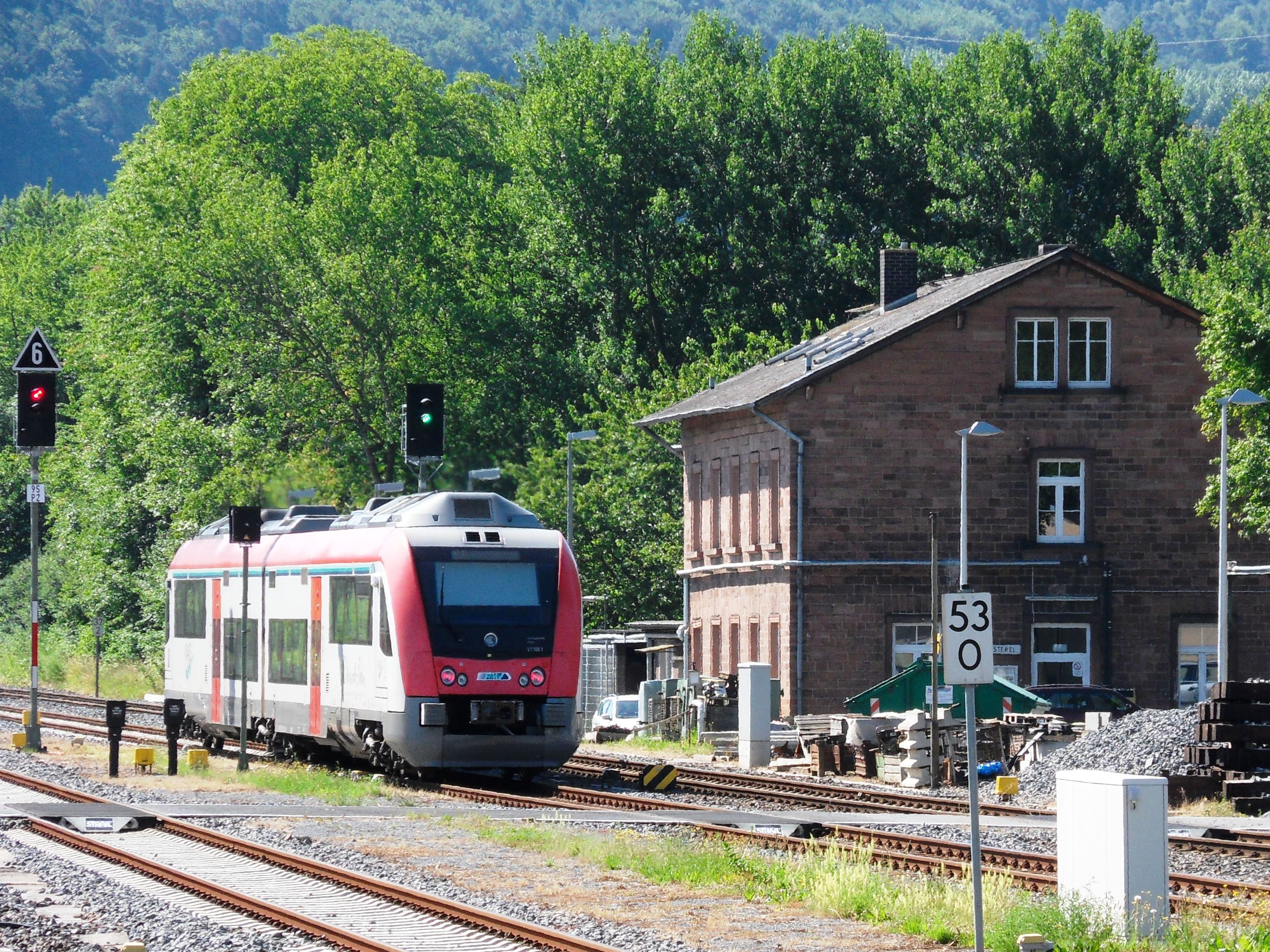
Station building of 1871, now used as a maintenance depot

The station was opened on 27 December 1870 along with the line to Babenhausen, which was extended to Hanau in 1882. The connection to Darmstadt was opened on 15 July 1871. The line to Erbach was opened on 24 December 1871 and it was extended to Eberbach in 1882. All of these lines and stations were built and operated by the Hessian Ludwig Railway (Hessische Ludwigsbahn).

The station was originally called Wiebelbach-Heubach. Wiebelbach and Heubach are now districts of Groß-Umstadt. The station is located some distance from the two villages that it was named after and was described as standing "in the middle of a green meadow." Between 1984 and 1988, Wiebelbach-Heubach station was served by a long-distance express train between Frankfurt and Stuttgart and it was considered the most isolated station served by express trains in Germany.

The first station building from 1871 is still preserved. It stands opposite the current station building on the Wiebelbach side of the track and was used after the construction of the second station building as a maintenance depot. The second station building was built on the Heubach (eastern) side of the tracks from 1905 to 1910. It is an eclectic mixture of styles with elements of the Renaissance, Art Nouveau and the Heimatstil (literally “home-style”, related to the Swiss chalet style). Both buildings—as well as the entire Odenwald Railway—are protected as monuments under the Hessian Monument Protection Act.

On 10 September 2005, the station was renamed—along with many other stations on the Odenwald Railway—to its current name.

== Infrastructure ==
In the station there is an electronic interlocking, which controls the entire Odenwald Railway.

== Rolling stock ==
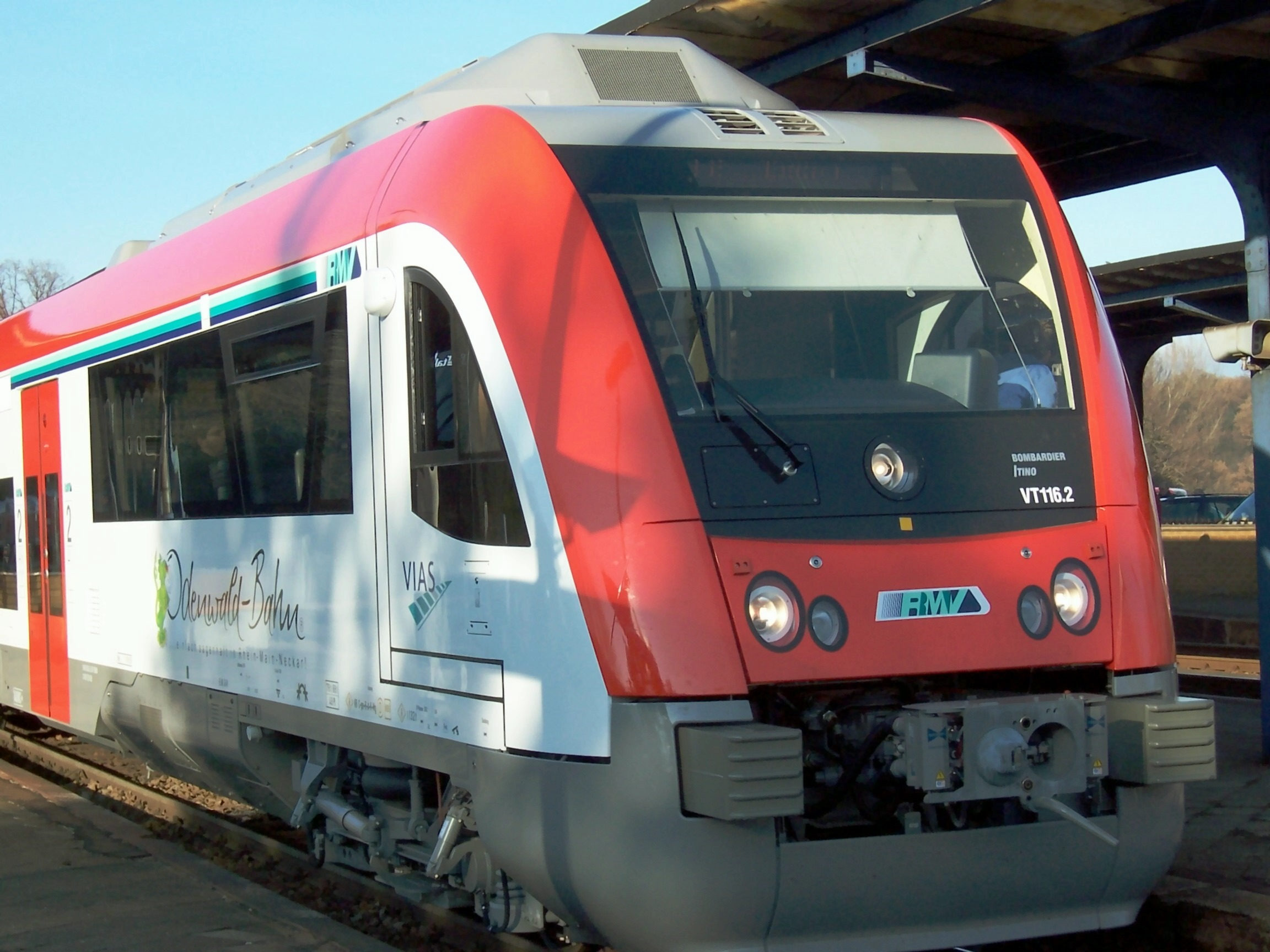
Bombardier Itino in Groß-Umstadt Wiebelsbach

The Odenwald railway is not electrified, so it is operated with Bombardier Itino diesel multiple units (class 613). All lines are operated by VIAS GmbH.

== Services ==
The following services serve the station:

Line	Route	Frequency
RE 80	Darmstadt Hbf – Darmstadt Nord – Reinheim (Odenw) – Groß-Umstadt Wiebelsbach – Erbach (Odenw)	60/120 min (weekdays)
RB 81	Darmstadt Hbf – Darmstadt Nord – Reinheim (Odenw) – Groß-Umstadt Wiebelsbach – Erbach (Odenw) – Eberbach – Eberbach	Some trains
RB 82	Frankfurt (Main) Hbf – Darmstadt Nord – Reinheim (Odenw) – Groß-Umstadt Wiebelsbach – Erbach (Odenw) – Eberbach	60/120 min
RE 85	Frankfurt (Main) Hbf – Offenbach (Main) Hbf – Hanau Hbf – Babenhausen (Hess) – Groß-Umstadt Wiebelsbach (– Erbach (Odenw))	120 min
RB 86	Hanau Hbf – Seligenstadt (Hess) – Babenhausen (Hess) – Groß-Umstadt Wiebelsbach	60 min

Some trains running as Regionalbahn service RB 81 to Darmstadt Central Station continue as RB 66 over the Main-Neckar Railway and the Pfungstadt Railway to Pfungstadt.
