= Darmstadt Nord station =

Railway station in Darmstadt, Germany

Darmstadt Nord
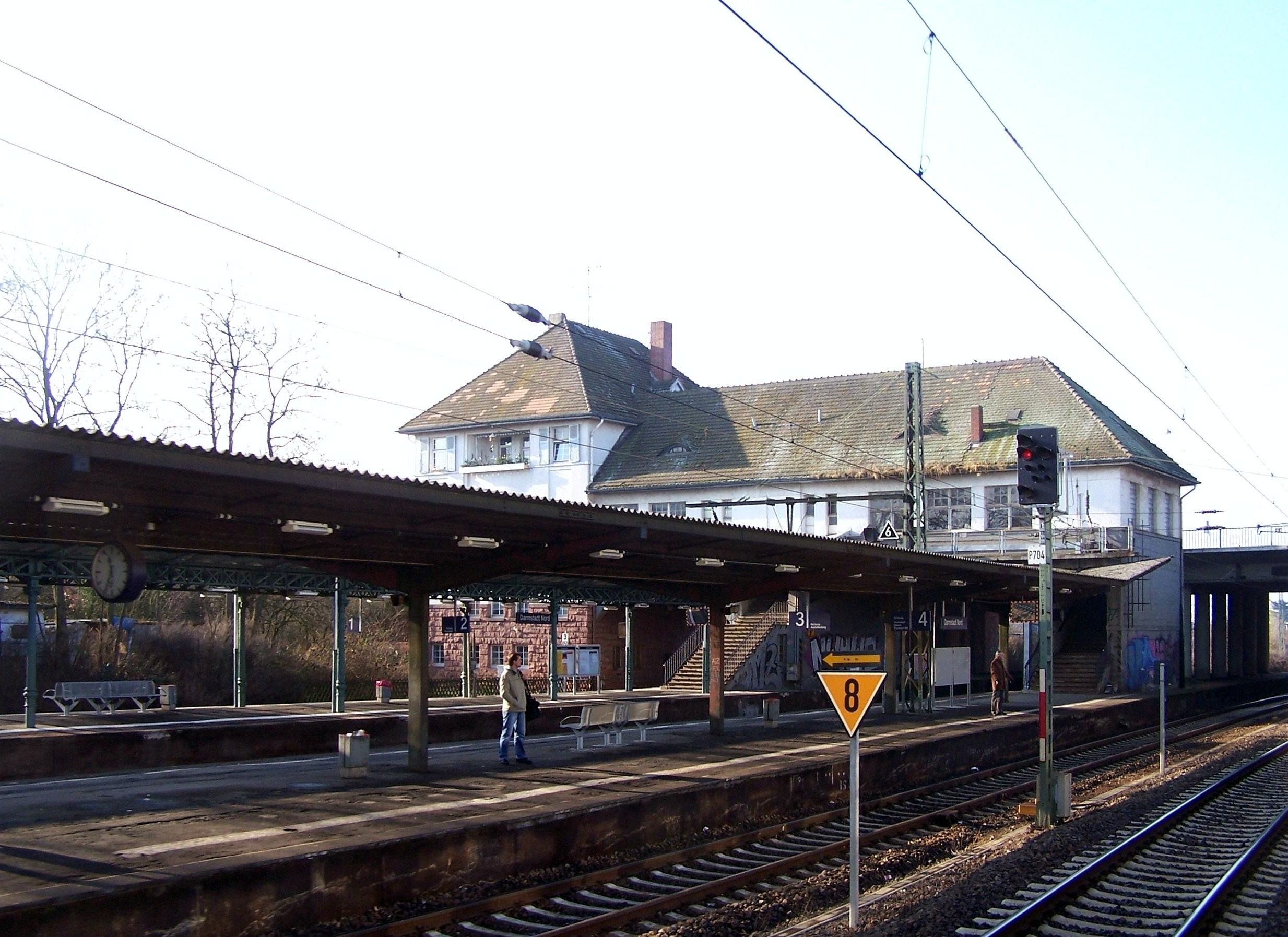
- Eastern side

General information
- Location: Frankfurter Str. 127, Darmstadt, Hesse; Germany
- Coordinates: 49°53′32″N 8°39′14″E
- Owner: DB Netz
- Operator: DB Station&Service
- Lines: Odenwald Railway (3.8 km) (KBS 641); Rhine-Main Railway (37.9 km) (KBS 651)
- Platforms: 4

Construction
- Accessible: No

Other information
- Station code: 1127
- DS100 code: FDN
- IBNR: 8001375
- Category: 5
- Fare zone: : 4001
- Website: www.bahnhof.de

History
- Opened: 1912

Passengers
- 2,500

Services
| Preceding station | VIAS | Following station |
|---|---|---|
| Darmstadt Hbf Terminus | RE 80 | Darmstadt Ost towards Erbach (Odenw) |
| Darmstadt Hbf Terminus | RB 81 | Darmstadt Ost towards Eberbach |
| Frankfurt (Main) Hbf Terminus | RB 82 | Darmstadt Ost towards Eberbach |
| Preceding station | Hessische Landesbahn | Following station |
| Darmstadt Hbf towards Wiesbaden Hbf | RB 75 | Darmstadt-Kranichstein towards Aschaffenburg Hbf |
Location

Darmstadt Nord (north) station is a junction station in the city of Darmstadt in the German state of Hesse. The passenger station, which is served by trains of the Odenwald Railway (German: Odenwaldbahn) and the Rhine-Main Railway (Rhine-Main-Bahn), has four platform tracks. Running parallel and north of the station are two additional tracks for freight traffic.

== Architecture ==
The Darmstadt Nord station building was built from 1909 to 1912 as part of the realignment of the railways around Darmstadt to serve the employees of the Merck company. The listed station was built in a traditional style of architecture typical of the early 20th century, according to the design of the head of planning of the railway divisions of Mainz (a joint division of the Prussian state railways and the Grand Duchy of Hesse State Railways), Frederick Mettegang. The entrance building is at ground level and is built above the tracks and is connected by stairs to its two platforms. The southern platform canopy is built out of iron in a neoclassical design from the early years of the railway in Darmstadt. It comes from an unknown station and was rebuilt at the new Darmstadt Nord station.

== Transport significance ==
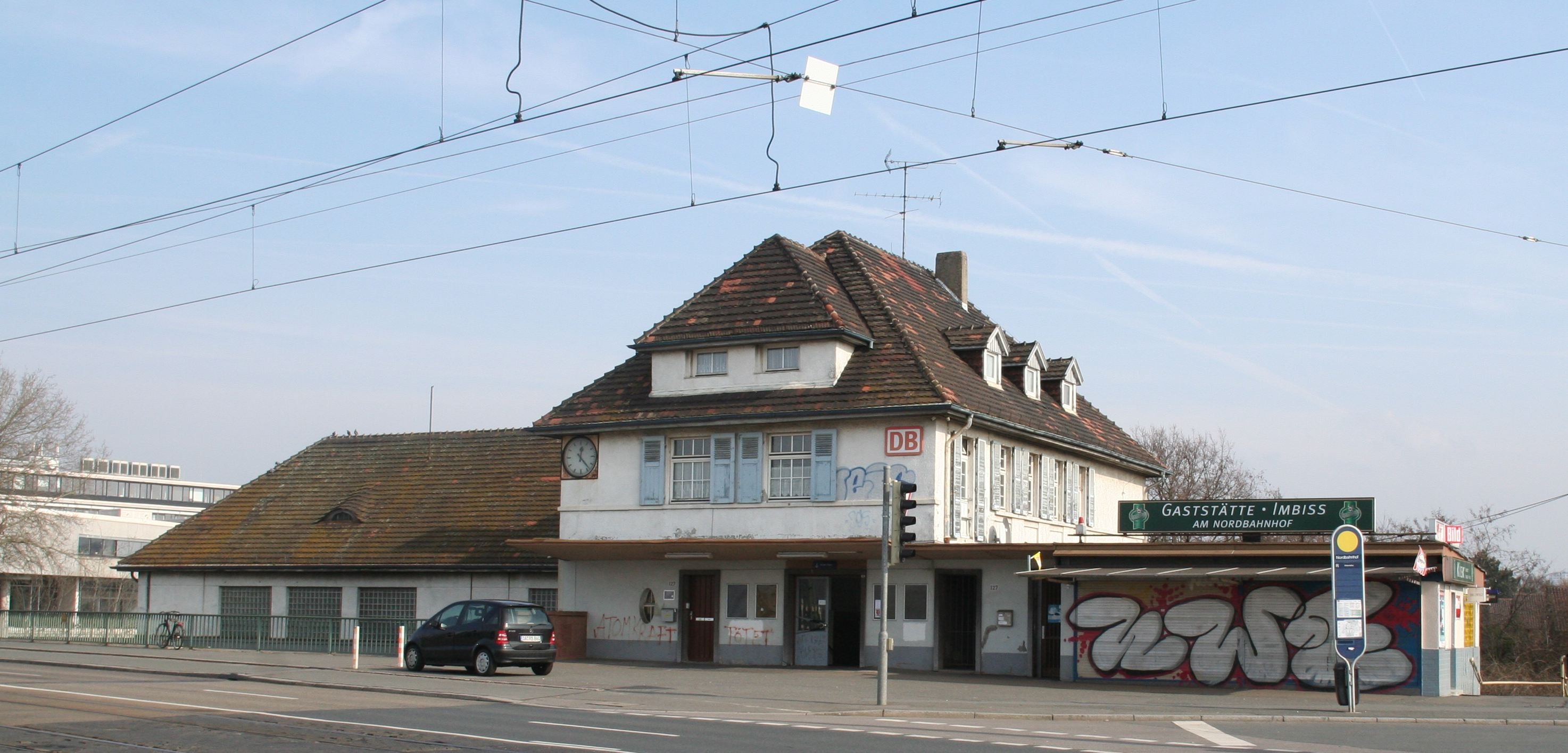
Western side

The lines towards Darmstadt Central Station (Hauptbahnhof) and Frankfurt and towards Babenhausen and Reinheim meet in the station. In addition, a freight link, which is about seven kilometres long, runs from Stockschneise junction (towards Weiterstadt) to Darmstadt-Kranichstein with connections towards Darmstadt Central Station and towards Arheiligen and Frankfurt.

Initially the station was a not a rail junction station. The lines from the Odenwald and the Rhine-Main Railway from Aschaffenburg ran on separate routes to Darmstadt Hauptbahnhof. After the Second World War, it changed into a junction station when the original route of the Odenwald railway was dismantled and its trains were diverted to the tracks of the line to Aschaffenburg from the Hauptbahnhof.

In 2005, the passenger tracks of the Odenwald railway were connected east of the station to the track of the Rhine-Main Railway running towards Darmstadt, which was in turn connected to the freight line. This rebuilding, costing €9 million, made it possible for trains from the Odenwald railway to run directly via the so-called Frankfurt curve (Frankfurter Kurve), which was originally intended only for freight traffic towards Arheilgen, so that they could continue on to Frankfurt. This meant that it was now classified as a Kreuzungsbahnhof (crossing station), as passenger services could now branch on both sides of the station.

The flyover of Frankfurter Straße runs parallel to the alignment of the Darmstadt Nord station building over the tracks; bus and tram services operate over it.

Darmstadt Nord station is a local transport node. It is served by regional train services to Wiesbaden, Darmstadt Hbf, Aschaffenburg, Frankfurt, Erbach and Eberbach, as well as tram lines 6, 7, 8 (all running between Merck and Eberstadt) and bus route R (between Darmstadt Nord station and Darmstadt Böllenfalltor) operated by the Darmstadt municipal transport company, HEAG mobilo.

DB Regio has operated Regionalbahn service RB 75 on the Rhine-Main Railway since the summer of 2008 with double-deck sets hauled by Class 143 locomotives. Services on the Odenwald Railway are operated by VIAS with Itino diesel multiple units.

== Rail services ==
The station is served by three services on the Odenwald Railway, each operating every two hours: Regional-Express service RE 65 between Darmstadt Hbf and Erbach, Stadt-Express service SE 65 between Frankfurt Hbf and Eberbach and Regionalbahn RB 65 between Darmstadt Hbf and Erbach. It is also served by RB 75, running every hour (during peak hours every 30 minutes) from Wiesbaden via Mainz to Groß Gerau and continuing through Darmstadt to Aschaffenburg.

| Line | Route | Frequency (mins) |
|---|---|---|
| RB 75 | Rhein-Main-Bahn; Wiesbaden Hbf – Mainz Hbf – Groß Gerau – Darmstadt Hbf – Darmstadt Nord – Babenhausen – Aschaffenburg Hbf | Mon-Fri: 25/35, Sat, Sun: 60 |
| RE 80 | Odenwaldbahn; Darmstadt Hbf – Darmstadt Nord – Reinheim (Odenw) – Groß-Umstadt Wiebelsbach – Erbach (Odenw) | 60/120 (weekdays) |
| RB 81 | Odenwaldbahn; Darmstadt Hbf – Darmstadt Nord – Reinheim (Odenw) – Groß-Umstadt Wiebelsbach – Erbach (Odenw) – Eberbach | Some trains |
| RB 82 | Odenwaldbahn; Frankfurt Hbf – Darmstadt Nord – Reinheim (Odenw) – Groß-Umstadt Wiebelsbach – Erbach (Odenw) (– Eberbach) | 60 |
