= Vias (rail company) =

German rail company

Vias GmbH
- Founded: 2005
- Key people: Jochen Auler, Herbert Häner, Sebastian Nießen
- Services: Rail services
- Number of employees: 210 (2016)
- Website: www.vias-online.de

The Vias GmbH (stylized VIAS) is a rail service company based in Frankfurt (Germany). The name of the company was taken from the Latin word via for way and the letter S for service. It operates rail services in the states of Hesse, Rhineland-Palatinate and North Rhine-Westphalia.

== Owners ==
The company was founded in 2005 by Stadtwerke Verkehrsgesellschaft Frankfurt am Main (VGF, the municipal transport company of Frankfurt) and Rurtalbahn GmbH (RTB) of Düren with both companies having equal shareholdings.

In March 2010, Danish State Railways announced that it had taken over VGF's shareholding with the help of its subsidiary DSB Deutschland GmbH.

== History ==
On 22 October 2010, Düren-based Vias DN2011 GmbH was founded by its shareholders, DSB Deutschland GmbH and R.A.T.H. GmbH with the aim of providing rail services. This company was first registered as Vias Odenwaldbahn GmbH on 19 February 2014 and renamed Vias Rail GmbH on 22 June 2015. In the meantime R.A.T.H. GmbH had become its sole shareholder. On 13 December 2015, Vias Rail GmbH took over the public transport services on the Odenwald network from Vias GmbH.

== Rail services ==
=== Lines in Hesse and Rhineland-Palatinate ===
Vias has operated the approximately 210-kilometre-long Odenwald Railway network on behalf of the Rhein-Main-Verkehrsverbund (RMV) and the state of Baden-Württemberg since 11 December 2005. It has also operated the East Rhine Railway since 12 December 2010 and the Pfungstadt Railway since 10 December 2011. It now operates on the following lines:

Number	Route name	Route	Contract period	Rolling stock	Comments
RB 10	Rheingau line	Frankfurt Hbf – Frankfurt-Höchst – Mainz-Kastel – Wiesbaden Hbf – Eltville – Rüdesheim (Rhein) – Lorch (Rhein) – Lorchhausen – St. Goarshausen – Koblenz Hbf – Neuwied	12.12.2010 – 11.12.2038	FLIRT	Runs on the tracks of the Taunus Railway, the Right Rhine Railway, the Lahn Valley Railway and the Neuwied–Koblenz railway
RE 19	Rheingau-Loreley-Express	Frankfurt Hbf – Frankfurt-Höchst – Mainz-Kastel – Eltville – Rüdesheim (Rhein) – Lorch (Rhein) – St. Goarshausen – Koblenz Hbf (– Kobern-Gondorf)	14.12.2025 – 11.12.2038	Stadler Flirt 3XL	Runs bypassing Wiesbaden Hauptbahnhof on the tracks of the Taunus Railway, the Right Rhine Line, the Lahn Valley Railway and the Moselle Line
RB 66	Pfungstadt Railway	Darmstadt Hbf – Darmstadt-Eberstadt – Pfungstadt	10.12.2011 – 11.12.2027	Itino / LINT 54	Operated to 2015 by Vias GmbH, since by Vias Rail GmbH
RB 86	Odenwald Railway	Hanau Hbf – Seligenstadt (Hess) – Babenhausen (Hess) – Groß-Umstadt Wiebelsbach	12.11.2005 – 12.11.2027	Itino / LINT 54	Operated to 2015 by Vias GmbH, since by Vias Rail GmbH
RE 85	Odenwald Railway	Frankfurt Hbf – Offenbach Hbf – Hanau Hbf – Seligenstadt (Hess) – Babenhausen (Hess) – Groß-Umstadt Wiebelsbach (–Höchst (Odenw) – Erbach (Odenw))	12.11.2005 – 12.11.2027	Itino / LINT 54	Operated to 2015 by Vias GmbH, since by Vias Rail GmbH
RB 82	Odenwald Railway	Frankfurt Hbf – Darmstadt Nord – Reinheim (Odenw) – Groß-Umstadt Wiebelsbach – Höchst (Odenw) – Erbach (Odenw)	12.11.2005 – 12.11.2027	Itino / LINT 54	Operated to 2015 by Vias GmbH, since by Vias Rail GmbH
RE 80	Odenwald Railway	Darmstadt Hbf – Darmstadt Nord – Reinheim (Odenw) – Groß-Umstadt Wiebelsbach – Höchst (Odenw) – Erbach (Odenw)	12.11.2005 – 12.11.2027	Itino / LINT 54	Operated to 2015 by Vias GmbH, since by Vias Rail GmbH
RB 81	Odenwald Railway	Darmstadt Hbf – Darmstadt Nord – Reinheim (Odenw) – Groß-Umstadt Wiebelsbach – Höchst (Odenw) – Erbach (Odenw) – Eberbach	12.11.2005 – 12.11.2027	Itino / LINT 54	Operated to 2015 by Vias GmbH, since by Vias Rail GmbH

The designation of the lines corresponds to the numbering of the RMV.

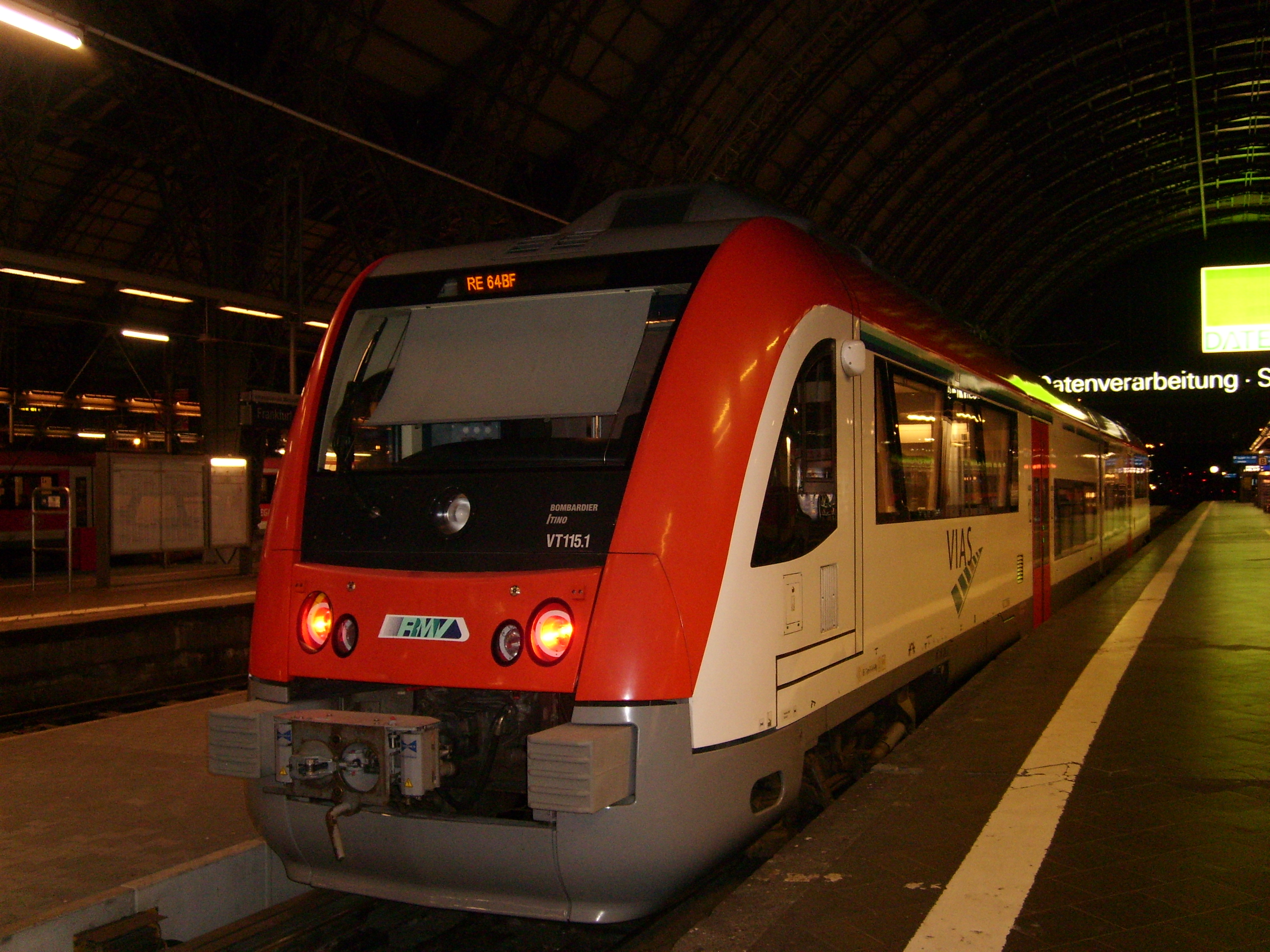
Vias Itino set in Frankfurter Hauptbahnhof

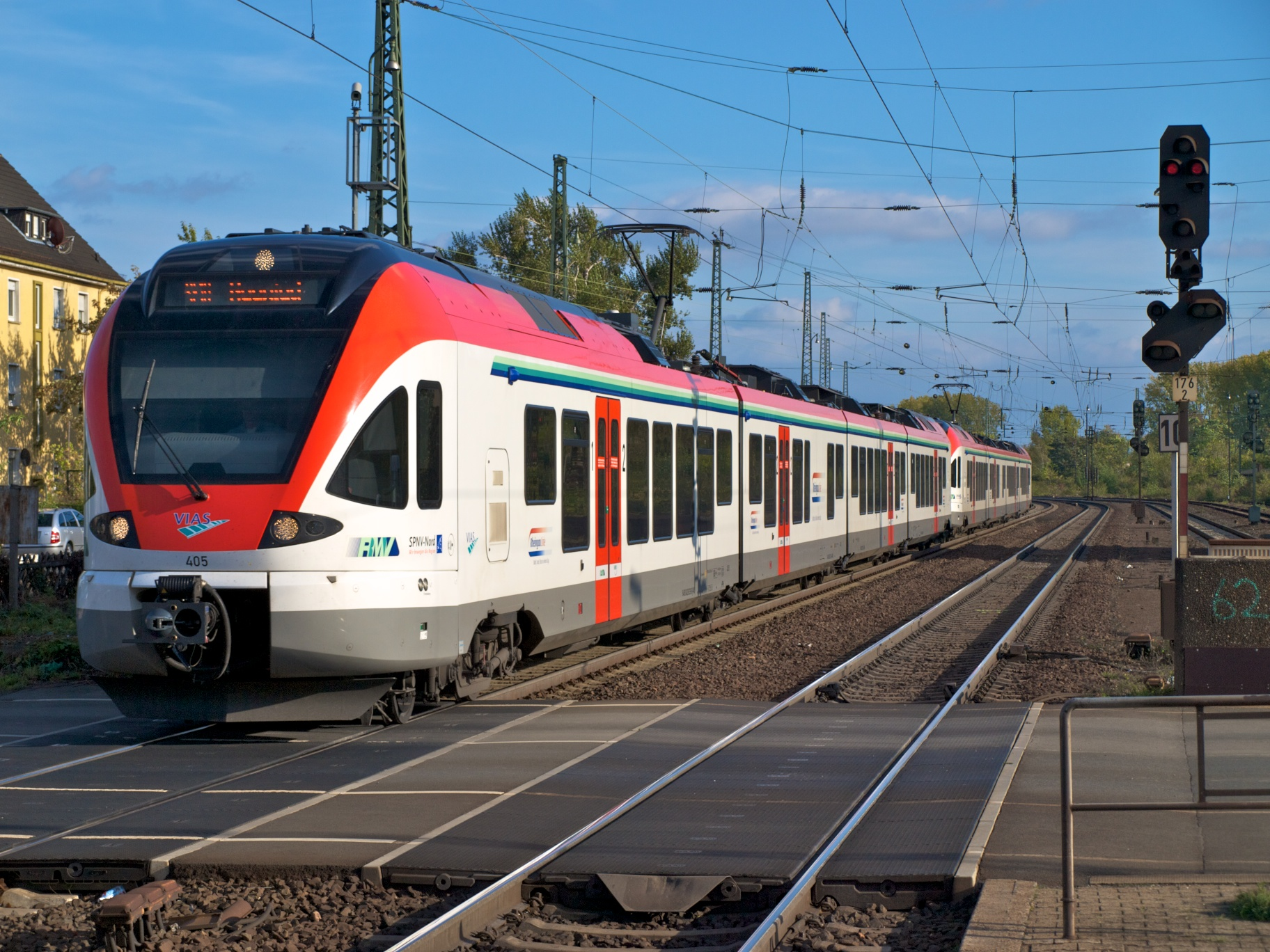
Vias FLIRT set at the entrance to Mainz-Kastel station

Since the commencement of operations in the Odenwald, 22 brand new Bombardier Itino diesel railcars have been supplied by the Fahrzeugmanagement Region Frankfurt RheinMain GmbH (fahma) for the operations. The maintenance takes place in the workshop of Odenwaldbahn-Infrastruktur GmbH in Michelstadt, which is also the location of the operating centre. Four more sets of the same type were ordered by the RMV in August 2007 due to a lack of capacity and were delivered in the spring of 2010. These are also used on the Pfungstadt Railway, which was restored to operation from the 2011/2012 timetable change.

In addition, Vias also took over the RheingauLinie local service on the East Rhine Railway between Neuwied, Koblenz Hbf (and Stadtmitte), Wiesbaden Hbf and Frankfurt Hauptbahnhof (RMV line 10) at the 2010/2011 timetable change in December 2010. 5 three-car and 14 four-car FLIRT electric multiple units were ordered for its operation.

In June 2021, the RMV announced that Vias GmbH would continue to operate the Rheingau route for another 15 years beyond 2023. The RheingauExpress (RE 9) would be put out to tender again in 2026.

After a new tender for the operation of the Railway and the Pfungstadt Railway, Vias Rail GmbH took over these lines with a contract for twelve years from December 2015. The existing Itino vehicles would continue to be used, although capacity adjustments would be made for some journeys were made. In addition to the driver, at least one train attendant is present on all journeys. In August 2019, the RMV announced that passenger demand in the Odenwald network had increased by over 50 percent to 15,000 people since the Vias began operating and the introduction of the improved timetable concept.

On 21 November 2022, VIAS Rail was awarded the contract for the regional express line RE 19 between Frankfurt (Main) Hbf and Koblenz Hbf, which will run every two hours from 2025 and replace RE 9. Some trips are already scheduled to start in Kobern-Gondorf (Mosel). New Stadler FLIRT locomotives are to be purchased.

The fare/transport associations of the areas that VIAS is serving are Rhein-Main-Verkehrsverbund, (RMV), Verkehrsverbund Rhein-Sieg (VRS), Westfalen-Tarif and Verkehrsverbund Rhein-Mosel (VRM).

=== Lines in North Rhine-Westphalia ===
On 26 March 2015, the Verkehrsverbund Rhein-Ruhr and Nahverkehr Rheinland (Rhineland local transport association) announced that Vias would operate the North Rhine-Westphalia Regionalbahn services RB 34 (Schwalm-Nette-Bahn from Mönchengladbach to Dalheim) and the northern part of the RB 38 service (the Erft-Bahn from Düsseldorf via Grevenbroich to Bedburg) from the timetable change on 10 December 2017. The RB 38 would no longer use its whole former route from the timetable change; instead passengers would have to change in Bedburg. The northern part is operated by Vias and has been renamed the RB 39. The transport association for the Rhineland (Nahverkehr Rheinland—Rhineland local transport) planned to electrify the southern (Bedburg-Cologne) section and operate it as an S-Bahn service, while the Verkehrsverbund Rhein-Ruhr, which is the transport authority that administers the northern section of the route has rejected the electrification of the line for "transport and economic reasons." Twelve new Alstom Coradia LINT sets (nine LINT 54H and three LINT 41H) are operated on the two lines. The contract for operating the service was signed with the new operator Vias for twelve years on 16 April 2015.

From 1 February 2022, Vias Rail operated line S 7 (Der Müngstener) and the Niederrhein-Netz (lines RE 19 and RB 35) subnetworks as part of an emergency award which were previously operated by the insolvent Abellio Rail NRW. The transport contract for the Lower Rhine network has now been extended through direct award until December 2025. The S 7 has been operated by RheinRuhrBahn since December 2023.

Since the timetable change in December 2023, Vias has also operated the Ruhr-Sieg network consisting of the lines RE 16 (Essen – Iserlohn), RB 46 (Bochum – Gelsenkirchen) and RB 91 (Hagen – Siegen/Iserlohn). The Stadler Flirt electric multiple units were acquired from the previous operator DB Regio.

Vias therefore operates on the following lines in North Rhine-Westphalia and across borders to the Netherlands (as of 2024):

Number	Railway used	Route	Contract period	Rolling stock
RE 16	Ruhr-Lenne-Express	Essen – Bochum – Witten – Hagen – Letmathe – Iserlohn	10.12.2023 – 12.12.2034	Stadler Flirt
RE 19	Rhein-IJssel-Express	Düsseldorf – Duisburg – Oberhausen – Wesel – Bocholt/ – Emmerich – Arnhem (split/joined in Wesel)	01.02.2022 – 14.12.2025	Stadler Flirt 3 (multi-system)
RB 34	Schwalm-Nette-Bahn	Mönchengladbach – Dalheim	10.12.2017 – 09.12.2029	Alstom Lint 41H
RB 35	Emscher-Niederrhein-Bahn	Mönchengladbach – Krefeld – Duisburg – Oberhausen – Gelsenkirchen	01.02.2022 – 14.12.2025	Stadler Flirt 3
RB 39	Düssel-Erft-Bahn	Düsseldorf – Neuss – Grevenbroich – Bedburg	10.12.2017 – 09.12.2029	Alstom Lint 54H and 41H
RB 46	Glückauf-Bahn	Bochum – Wanne-Eickel – Gelsenkirchen	10.12.2023 – 12.12.2026	Stadler Flirt
RB 91	Ruhr-Sieg-Bahn; Ruhr-Sieg-Bahn	Hagen – Iserlohn-Letmathe (split/joined) front set: – Siegen rear set: – Iserlohn	10.12.2023 – 12.12.2034	Stadler Flirt

Former line:

S7	Der Müngstener	Wuppertal – Remscheid – Solingen	01.02.2022 – 09.12.2023	Alstom Lint 41H
