= Darmstadt Hauptbahnhof =

Main railway station of Darmstadt, Germany

Darmstadt Hbf
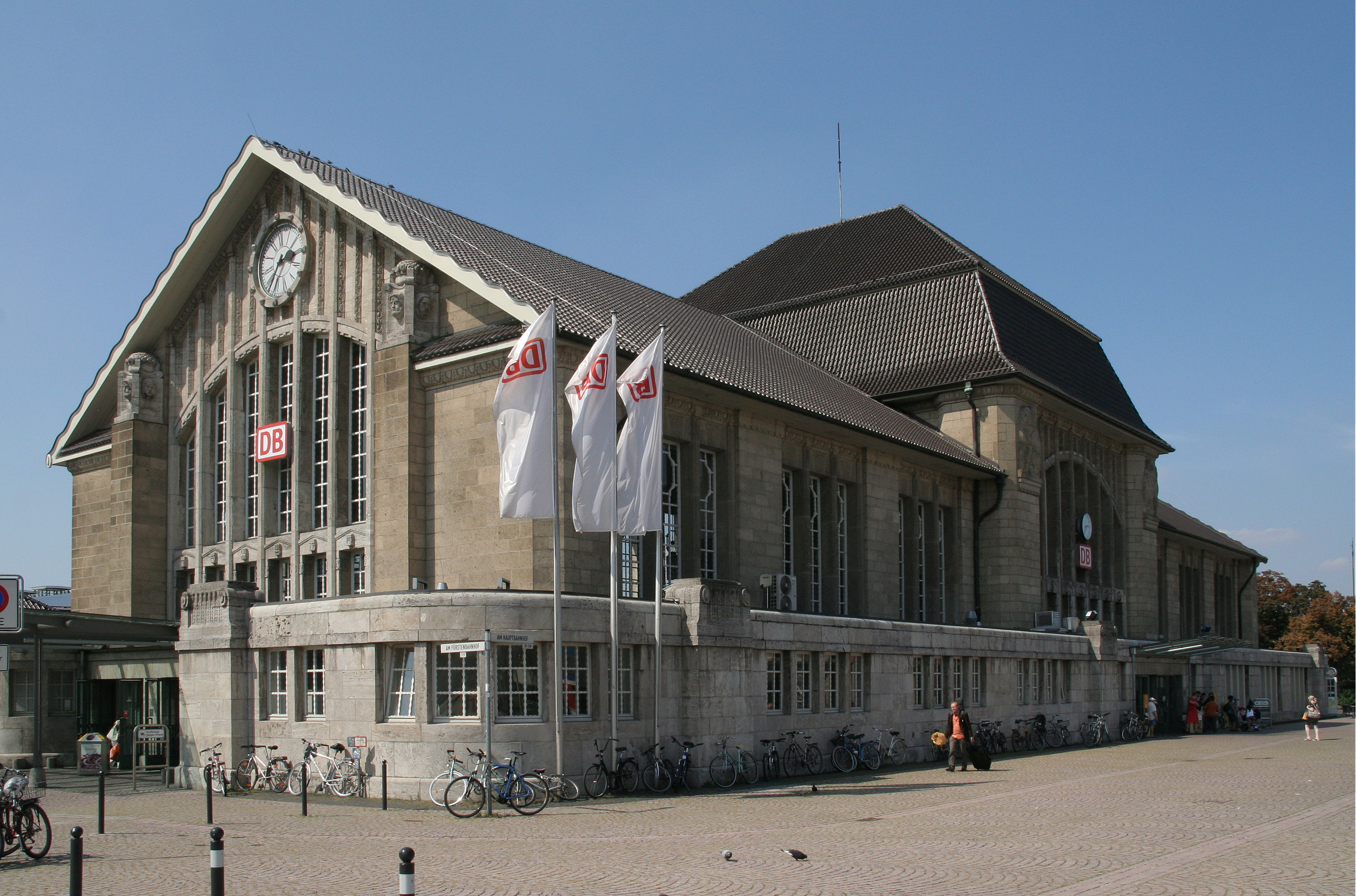

General information
- Location: Am Hauptbahnhof 20 2, 64293 Darmstadt, Darmstadt, Hesse; Germany
- Coordinates: 49°52′21″N 8°37′46″E
- Owner: Deutsche Bahn
- Operator: DB Netz; DB Station&Service
- Lines: Odenwald Railway (KBS 641); Main-Neckar Railway (KBS 650); Rhine-Main Railway (KBS 651); to Goddelau until 1970
- Platforms: 11

Construction
- Accessible: Yes
- Architect: Friedrich Pützer
- Architectural style: Art Nouveau

Other information
- Station code: 1126
- DS100 code: FD
- IBNR: 8000068
- Category: 2
- Fare zone: : 4001
- Website: www.bahnhof.de

History
- Opened: 1912

Passengers
- About 30,000
Services
Preceding station	DB Fernverkehr	Following station
Frankfurt (Main) Süd towards Berlin Ostbahnhof	ICE 13	Bensheim towards Karlsruhe Hbf or Stuttgart Hbf
Frankfurt (Main) Hbf towards Ostseebad Binz	ICE 15	Bensheim towards Saarbrücken Hbf
Frankfurt (Main) Hbf towards Berlin Ostbahnhof	ICE 16	Mannheim Hbf towards Saarbrücken Hbf
Frankfurt (Main) Süd One-way operation	ICE/ECE 20	Heidelberg Hbf towards Stuttgart Hbf
Frankfurt (Main) Hbf towards Bremen Hbf	ICE 26	Bensheim towards Karlsruhe Hbf
Terminus	ICE 41	Frankfurt (Main) Hbf towards München Hbf
Frankfurt (Main) Hbf Terminus	ICE 62	Bensheim towards Graz Hbf
Frankfurt (Main) Hbf Terminus	IC 87	Bensheim towards Singen (Hohentwiel)
Frankfurt (Main) Hbf Terminus	ICE 89	Weinheim (Bergstraße) Hbf One-way operation
Preceding station		Following station
Frankfurt (Main) Süd towards Berlin Hbf	FLX 10	Heidelberg Hbf towards Stuttgart Hbf
Preceding station	DB Regio Mitte	Following station
Langen towards Frankfurt (Main) Hbf	RE 60	Darmstadt Süd towards Mannheim Hbf
Langen towards Frankfurt (Main) Hbf	RB 68	Darmstadt Süd towards Wiesloch-Walldorf
Preceding station	Hessische Landesbahn	Following station
Weiterstadt towards Wiesbaden Hbf	RB 75	Darmstadt Nord towards Aschaffenburg Hbf
Preceding station	VIAS	Following station
Terminus	RE 80	Darmstadt Nord towards Erbach (Odenw)
Terminus	RB 66	Darmstadt Süd towards Pfungstadt
Terminus	RB 81	Darmstadt Nord towards Eberbach
Preceding station	Rhine-Main S-Bahn	Following station
Arheilgen towards Friedberg (Hess)	S6 (Rhine-Main S-Bahn)	Terminus
Location

Darmstadt Hauptbahnhof is the main railway station in the German city Darmstadt. After Frankfurt Hbf and Wiesbaden Hbf, it is the third largest station in the state of Hesse with 35,000 passengers and 220 trains per day.

Built in a late Art Nouveau style, the station was finished 1912 as one of the major works of architect Friedrich Pützer. The station replaced two separate and increasingly inadequate stations located at the Steubenplatz, around a km closer to the city centre in the east.

== History ==
The predecessors of Darmstadt Hauptbahnhof were two separate stations in today's Steubenplatz, which were built by two railway companies in the 19th century when Darmstadt was connected to the rail network: the Main-Neckar station, a through station on the Frankfurt–Heidelberg line, opened in 1846, and the Ludwig station, a terminal station on the Mainz–Aschaffenburg railway, opened in 1858.

The space at both stations became very cramped as a result of the increase in traffic at the end of the 19th century. Due to urban growth in Darmstadt, all space at the stations had been used, so that the necessary extensions of the old sites were not possible and the separation into two stations made operations difficult and road traffic on the level crossing of the Main-Neckar Railway over Rheinstraße created an obstruction to traffic.

=== Planning ===
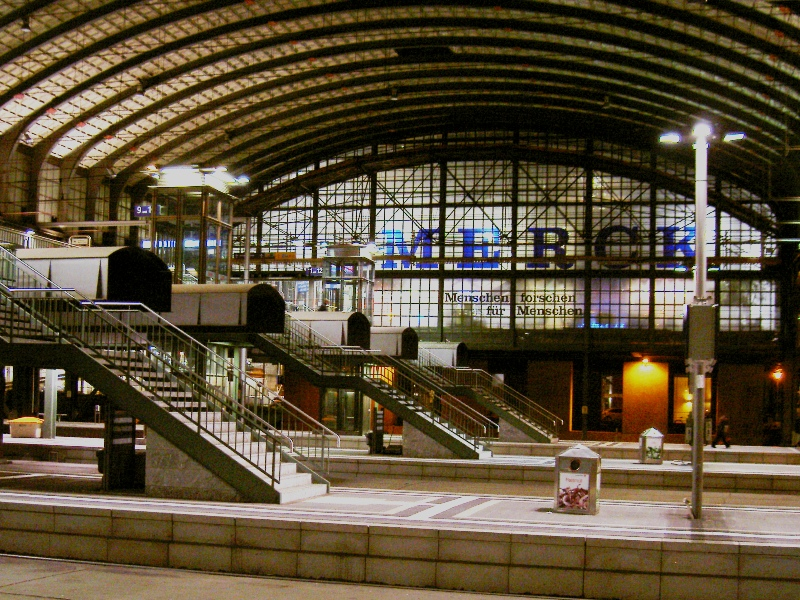
The elevated concourse of Darmstadt station (2004)

Beginning in 1901 four different designs were developed, focused primarily on a solving the problems of managing traffic, and subsequently discarded. In 1905, the city and the Prussian-Hessian Railway division in Mainz finally agreed on a fifth draft. It stipulated that a new through station would be built on a then green-field site about 800 metres west of the old stations. The greater distance from the city centre would be compensated by providing a connecting tram. The post office would have its own railway post office north of the entrance building, connected by the "Post Bridge" (Poststeg), its own covered bridge, to trains at the mail and baggage platforms below it. The Post Bridge was demolished in 1994.

The tracks in the southern part of the station precinct were placed in a cutting so that the streets could be built over it. The same was true of the station building: passengers enter the station building at street level, pass through the station on the same level and reach the platforms by stairs from an overpass (for some years there have also been lifts). Parallel to this there was a separate overpass for luggage and the express freight service (this was converted in the last renovation into a bicycle parking garage). The northern tracks of the station precinct are on an embankment as the station site slopes down to the north.

An architectural competition was announced for the construction of the station building. At the express request of Grand Duke Ernst Ludwig, the new station would be built by a modern master builder (Baumeister), not a style architect (Stilarchitekten). Kaiser Wilhelm II refrained for diplomatic reasons from intervening on the issue, although he intervened in the design of many other station buildings on the Prussian state railways.

A total of 75 designs were submitted. Friedrich Pützer and Friedrich Klingholz each received a second prize. The contract was awarded in 1908 to Friedrich Pützer. It took him two years to complete his designs, into which he also incorporated some good ideas from the designs of his competitors.

Construction began in 1906 and was completed in 1912 at a total cost of 17 million marks. At that time, the experts made a fairly cautious judgements about the new building: "it has some very efficient services, but no great ideas." Today the building is regarded as groundbreaking and it is protected as a monument.

A water tower was built at the Dornheimer Weg bridge to supply the locomotives with water in 1910. This building, which was set to be demolished in 1978, is also now under monument protection.

=== Architecture of the entrance building ===
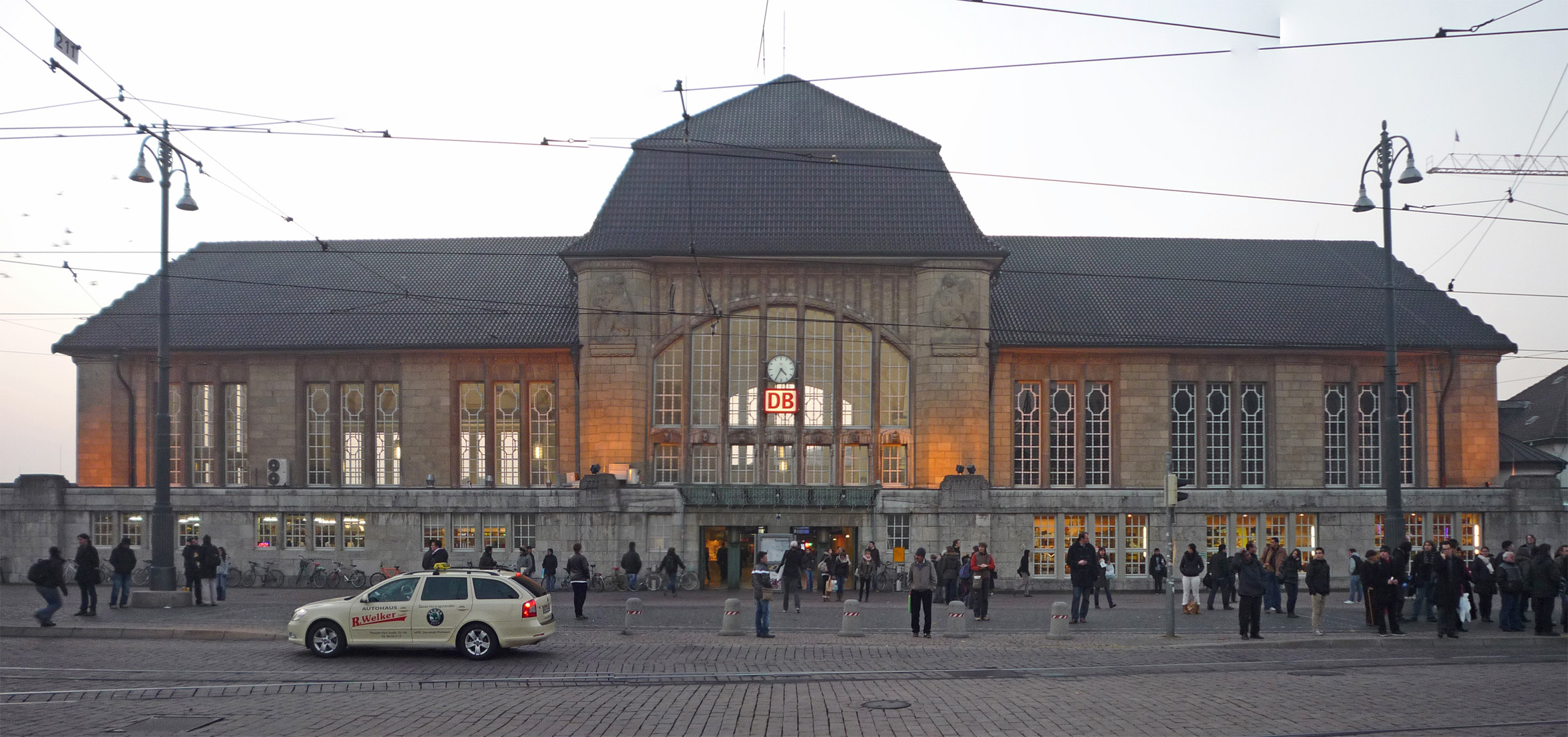
Exterior view of Darmstadt station

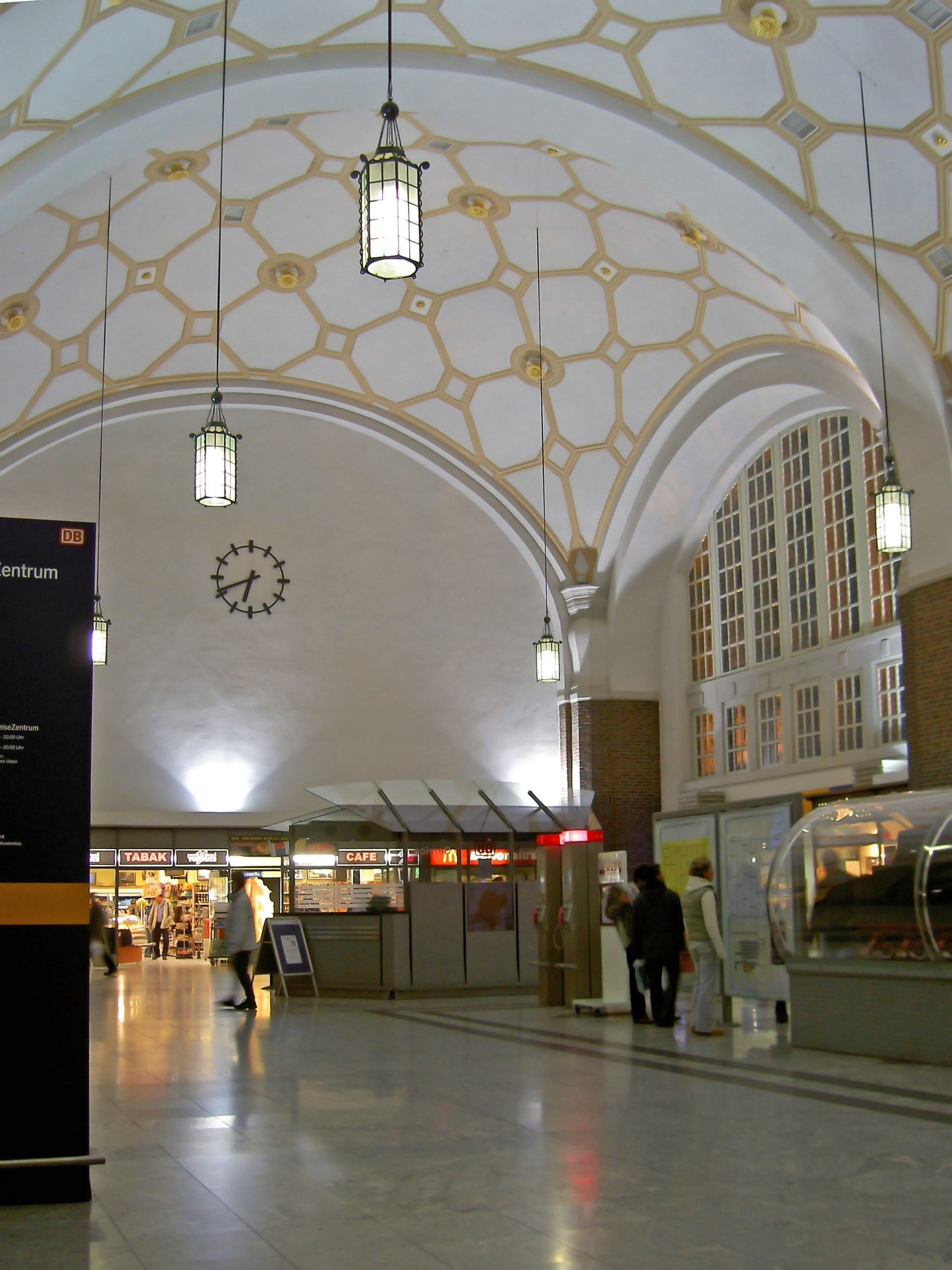
Inside the entrance hall of Darmstadt station after the last renovation

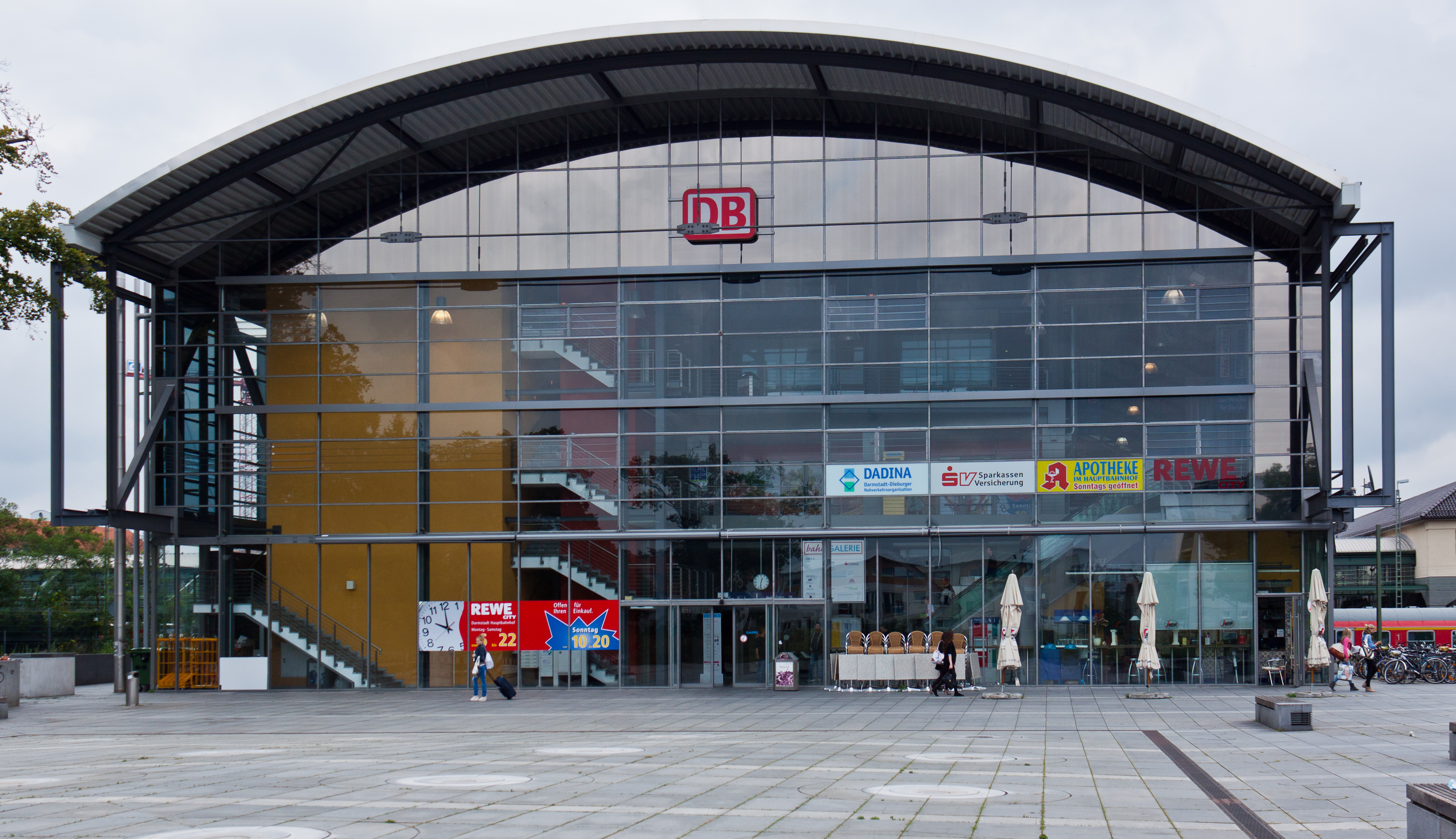
Exterior view of the western shopping centre

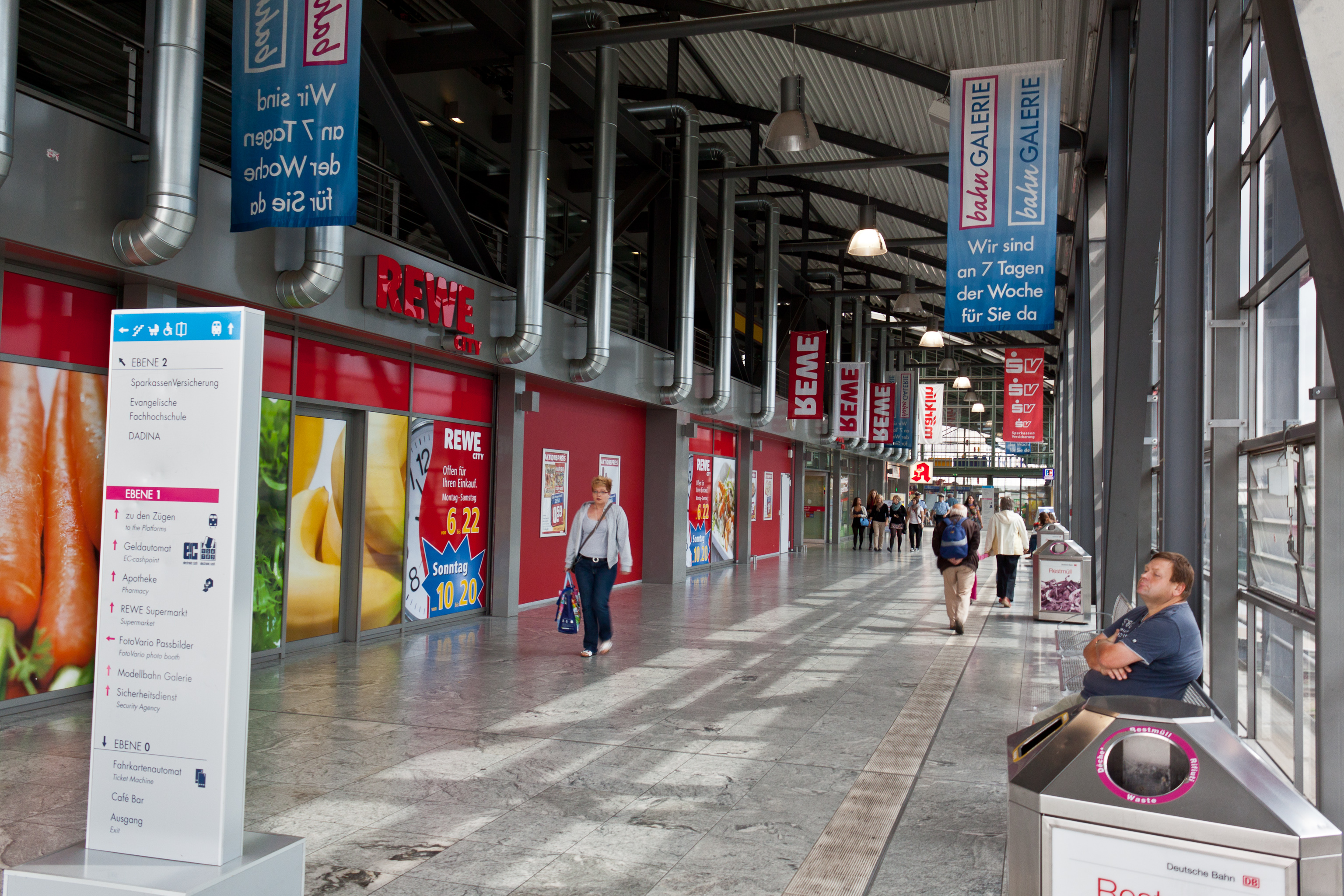
Interior view of the western shopping centre

The station represents the traditionalist architecture of Pützer, as was typical for railway buildings at the time. The design elements on the facade and the interior are reminiscent of the then fashionable Art Nouveau style.

The station building was renovated from 1998 to 2002, requiring intensive conservation. The 94 metres long and 34 metres wide platform area has ten platform tracks and was renewed in 2005–2008 for approximately €31 million. Lifts were installed on the passenger overpass over the platforms to connect with the platforms below, supplementing the stairs, so that the station was accessible for the handicapped for the first time. The elevated platform overpass was extended to accommodate a shopping centre in 2000 with finance from the city of Darmstadt; this also allows access to the district to the west, which is the location of the seat of the European Space Operations Centre, among other things.

A special feature is the so-called Fürstenbahnhof (“princely station”) in the south of the station building, which has since developed into a facility for public transport. It had the usual waiting rooms for this purpose, sanitary facilities, a spacious driveway and its own entrance to platform 1, the princely platform. Its solid wall with numerous Art Nouveau features is largely preserved. The former Bahnpolizei (railway police) were located here before the last renovation of the entrance building. In mid-2010, the Fürstenbahnhof restaurant was opened to the public in the princely station.

In 1972, the former twelve signal boxes were replaced by a modern signal control centre.

== Rail services ==
=== Long-distance ===
The station is on the long-distance network of Deutsche Bahn, although the majority of traffic on the north–south long-distance routes runs on the Mannheim–Frankfurt railway. Several Intercity and Intercity-Express lines connect the city directly to Karlsruhe, Stralsund (via Hanover and Hamburg) and Salzburg (via Stuttgart and Munich). In the 2026 timetable, the following services stop at the station:

Line	Route		Frequency
ICE 13	Berlin Ostbahnhof – Berlin – Wolfsburg – Braunschweig – Kassel – Frankfurt South – Darmstadt – Heidelberg –	Karlsruhe	Every four hours
ICE 13	Berlin Ostbahnhof – Berlin – Wolfsburg – Braunschweig – Kassel – Frankfurt South – Darmstadt – Heidelberg –	Stuttgart	Every four hours
ICE 15	Binz – Stralsund – Eberswalde – Berlin – Halle – Erfurt – Frankfurt – Darmstadt – Mannheim – Kaiserslautern – Saarbrücken		Twice a day
ICE 26	Bremen – Hanover – Kassel-Wilhelmshöhe – Gießen – Frankfurt – Darmstadt – Heidelberg – Karlsruhe		Every 4 hours
ICE 41	Darmstadt – Frankfurt – Frankfurt Airport – Köln Messe/Deutz – Düsseldorf – Duisburg – Essen – Dortmund – Paderborn – Kassel-Wilhelmshöhe – Fulda – Würzburg – Nuremberg – Munich		Single service
ICE 62	Frankfurt – Darmstadt – Stuttgart – Munich – Salzburg – Villach – Klagenfurt – Graz		2 train pairs
IC 87	Frankfurt – Heidelberg – Stuttgart – Singen		Individual services
FLX 10	Berlin Hbf – Berlin Südkreuz – Halle (Saale) – Erfurt – Gotha – Eisenach – Fulda – Frankfurt South – Darmstadt – Heidelberg – Stuttgart		1–2 train pairs

An ICE Sprinter also operates in the morning from Darmstadt to Berlin via Frankfurt.

=== Regional services ===
Darmstadt station has been served by the Rhine-Main S-Bahn since 1997, originally by lines S3 and S4 and from December 2024 by line S6. Other regional connections are available to Frankfurt via (Langen), Wiesbaden (via Groß-Gerau and Mainz), Aschaffenburg (via Dieburg and Babenhausen), Mannheim and Heidelberg (via Bensheim and Weinheim) and Eberbach (via Groß-Umstadt Wiebelsbach). The lines to Riedstadt-Goddelau (via Griesheim) and Groß-Zimmern (via Roßdorf), on the other hand, have been closed for a long time. The Pfungstadt Railway (Pfungstadtbahn) to Pfungstadt was reactivated at the beginning of the 2011/2012 timetable on 11 December 2011. It is served by the extension of services on the Odenwald Railway (Odenwaldbahn) from Darmstadt station to Pfungstadt as RB 66. In the 2026 timetable, the following services stop at the station:

Line	Route	Frequency
RE 60	Frankfurt – Darmstadt – Bensheim – Heppenheim – Weinheim – Mannheim	Hourly
RE 80	Darmstadt – Darmstadt Nord – Reinheim – Groß-Umstadt Wiebelsbach – Erbach	Every two hours (Mon–Fri)
RB 66	Darmstadt – Darmstadt-Eberstadt – Pfungstadt	Hourly
RB 68	Frankfurt – Darmstadt – Bensheim – Heppenheim – Weinheim – Neu-Edingen/Friedrichsfeld – Heidelberg – Wiesloch-Walldorf	Hourly
RB 75	Wiesbaden – Mainz – Groß Gerau – Darmstadt – Dieburg – Babenhausen – Aschaffenburg	Hourly; Every half hour (Mon–Fri; Sat Wiesbaden–Darmstadt)
RB 81	Darmstadt – Darmstadt Nord – Reinheim – Groß-Umstadt Wiebelsbach – Erbach – Eberbach	Every two hours
S6 (Rhine-Main S-Bahn)	Friedberg (Hess) – Bad Vilbel – Frankfurt West – Frankfurt – Frankfurt Süd – Langen – Darmstadt	Every half hour

=== Other public transport ===
The station is connected by trams and buses to the urban transport network and served by regional bus lines. There is also a direct bus to Frankfurt Airport. Darmstadt Hauptbahnhof is just east of the city's major roads: Autobahnen (Bundesautobahn 5 and Bundesautobahn 67). Darmstadt Hauptbahnhof is on the main west–east road the Bundesstraße 26. A few blocks away is the main north–south road the Bundesstraße 3.

== See also ==
- Rail transport in Germany
- Railway stations in Germany
