= Darmstadt Süd station =

Railway station in Darmstadt, Germany

Darmstadt Süd
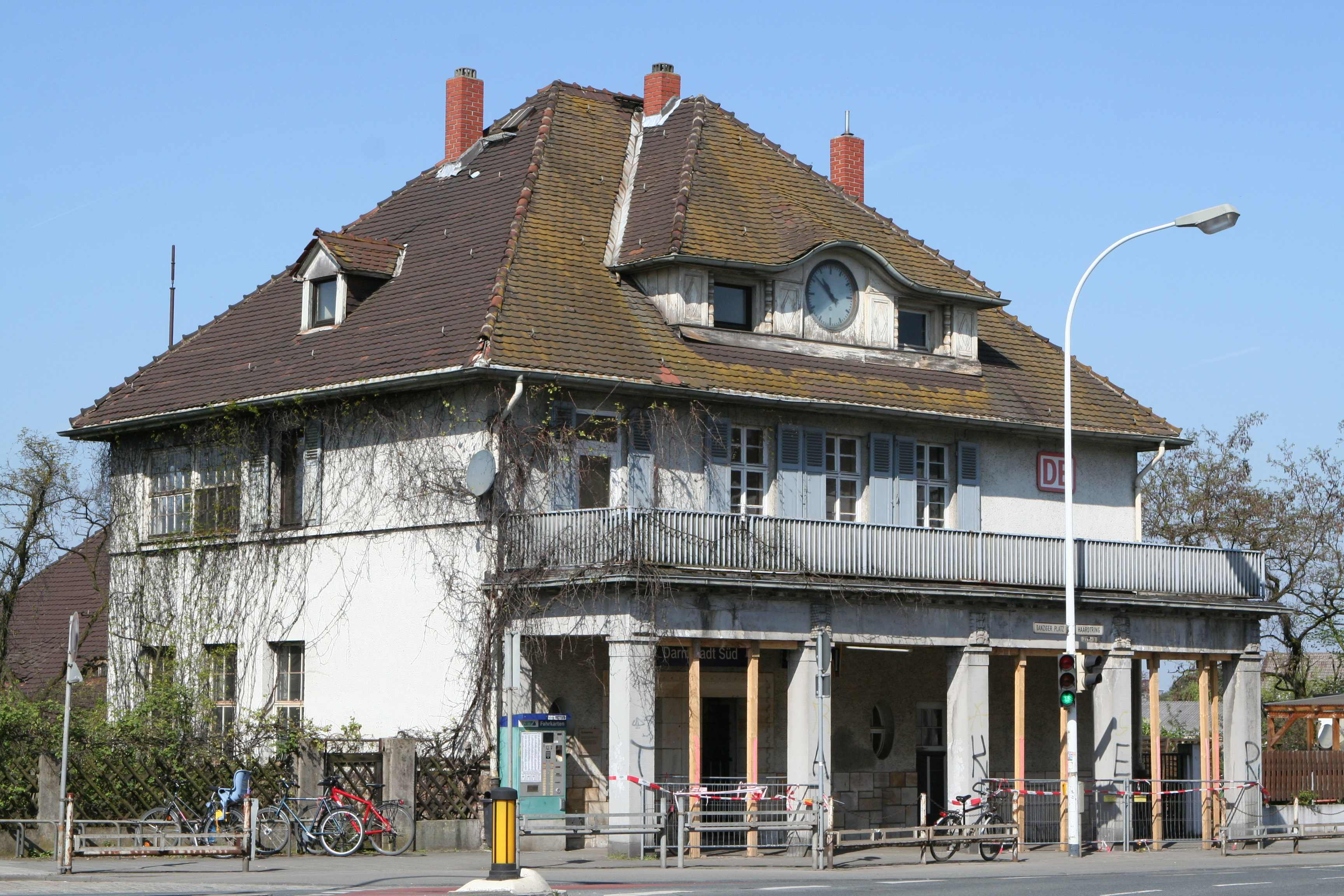
- Entrance building from the street side

General information
- Location: Darmstadt, Hesse; Germany
- Coordinates: 49°51′20″N 8°38′12″E
- Owner: Deutsche Bahn
- Operator: DB Netz; DB Station&Service
- Line: Main-Neckar Railway (29.7 km)
- Platforms: 2

Construction
- Accessible: Yes
- Architect: Friedrich Mettegang

Other information
- Station code: 1129
- DS100 code: FDS
- IBNR: 8001377
- Category: 5
- Fare zone: : 4001
- Website: www.bahnhof.de

History
- Opened: 1912; 114 years ago

Services
Preceding station	DB Regio Mitte	Following station
Darmstadt Hbf towards Frankfurt (Main) Hbf	RB 68	Darmstadt-Eberstadt towards Wiesloch-Walldorf
Preceding station	VIAS	Following station
Darmstadt Hbf Terminus	RB 66	Darmstadt-Eberstadt towards Pfungstadt
Location

Darmstadt South station (German: Bahnhof Darmstadt Süd) is in the city of Darmstadt in the German state of Hesse on the Main-Neckar Railway. The station building is protected under the Hessian Monument Protection Act. It is classified by Deutsche Bahn as a category 5 station.

== History ==
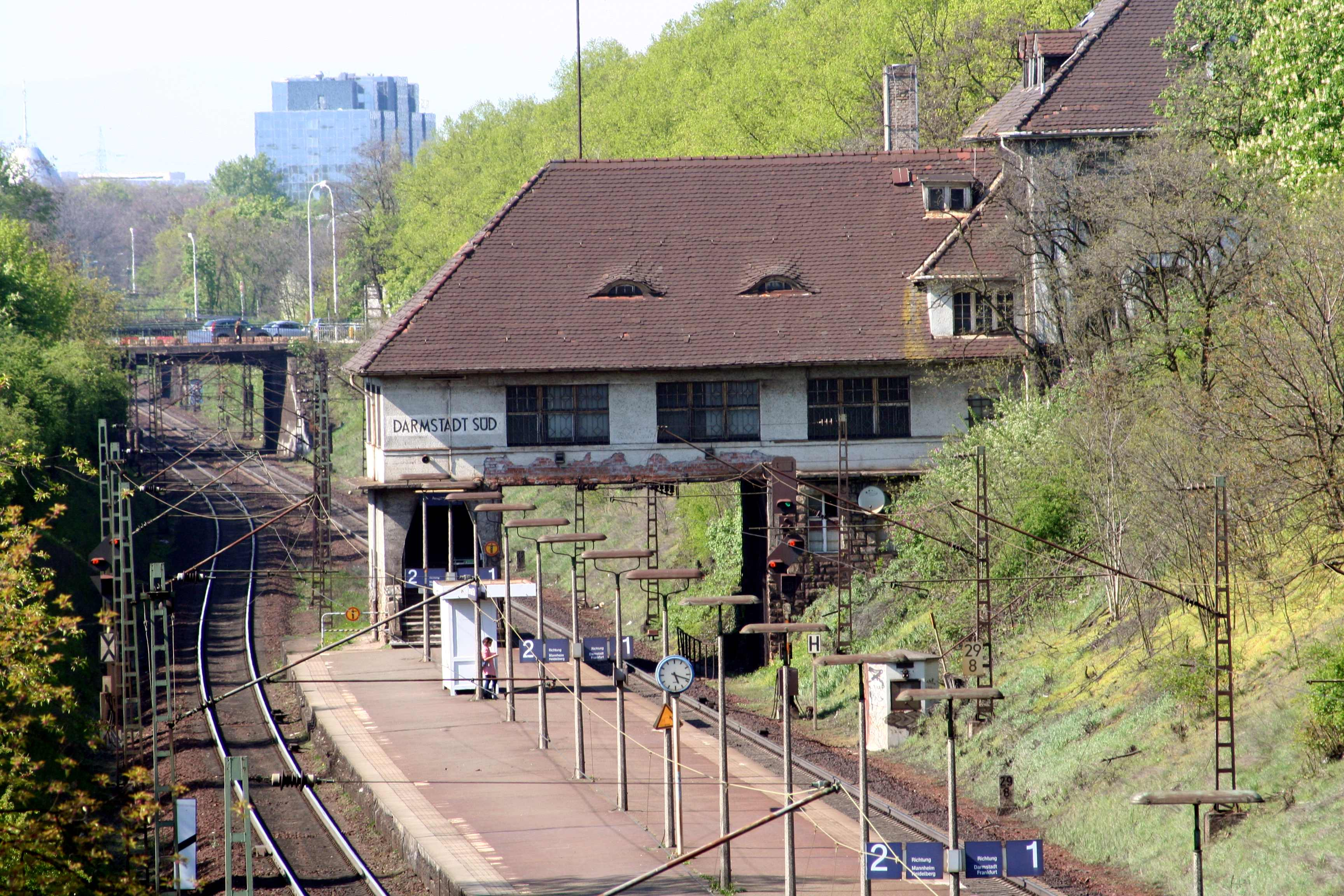
Darmstädt South station (track side)

The first station was built on the old route of the Main-Neckar Railway, at the corner of Donnersbergring and Bessunger Straße on 15 October 1879 as Haltepunkt Bessungen (Bessungen halt); it was called Darmstadt Süd from 27 November 1902. It was served by passenger and freight services. With the construction of the Darmstadt Hauptbahnhof from 1909 to 1912, the Main-Neckar Railway was shifted to the west and lowered and a new Darmstädt South station was built.

The station building was acquired as part of a package with other station buildings by the British real estate investment company, Patron Capital on 1 January 2008.

== Architecture ==
The new station was designed in neoclassical and traditional styles by the architect of the Mainz railway division (Eisenbahndirektion), Friedrich Mettegang. The cubic building has a rendered facade and windows with horizontal bars and shutters. A balcony standing on five square pillars points to the street front. The upper building is topped by a hip roof, and on the east side it has a "bat" dormer (Fledermausgaube) with a central round clock. The dormer windows have wood paneling, decorated by tapes and diamond motifs and turned round columns.

== Rail services ==
The station is served by Regionalbahn services RB 67 and RB 68, which run through the station as coupled sets and are coupled/uncoupled at Neu-Edingen/Friedrichsfeld. Since the timetable change of 2011/2012 on 11 December 2011, the station has been served by the Regionalbahn RB 66 (the Pfungstadtbahn) from Darmstadt to Pfungstadt. This runs in the peak hour, after stopping at Darmstadt Hauptbahnhof, continuing to Groß-Umstadt Wiebelsbach /Erbach as RB 81 or RE 80. Trains runs as follows (as of 2025):

Line	Route	Frequency
RB 66	Darmstadt – Darmstadt Süd – Darmstadt-Eberstadt – Pfungstadt (some continuing from Darmstadt as RB81/RE80 to Groß-Umstadt Wiebelsb./Erbach)	60 min
RB 67	Frankfurt – Darmstadt – Darmstadt Süd – Bensheim – Weinheim – Neu-Edingen/Friedrichsfeld – Mannheim	60 min
RB 68	Frankfurt (Main) – Darmstadt – Darmstadt Süd – Bensheim – Weinheim – Neu-Edingen/Friedrichsfeld – Heidelberg – (Wiesloch-Walldorf)	60 min

The South station also has a stop on bus route H (between Darmstadt Anne-Frank-Straße and Darmstadt Alfred-Messel-Weg or Kranichstein Kesselhutweg) operated by HEAG mobilo, Darmstadt's municipal transport company.
