= Pfungstadt Railway =

Railway line in Germany

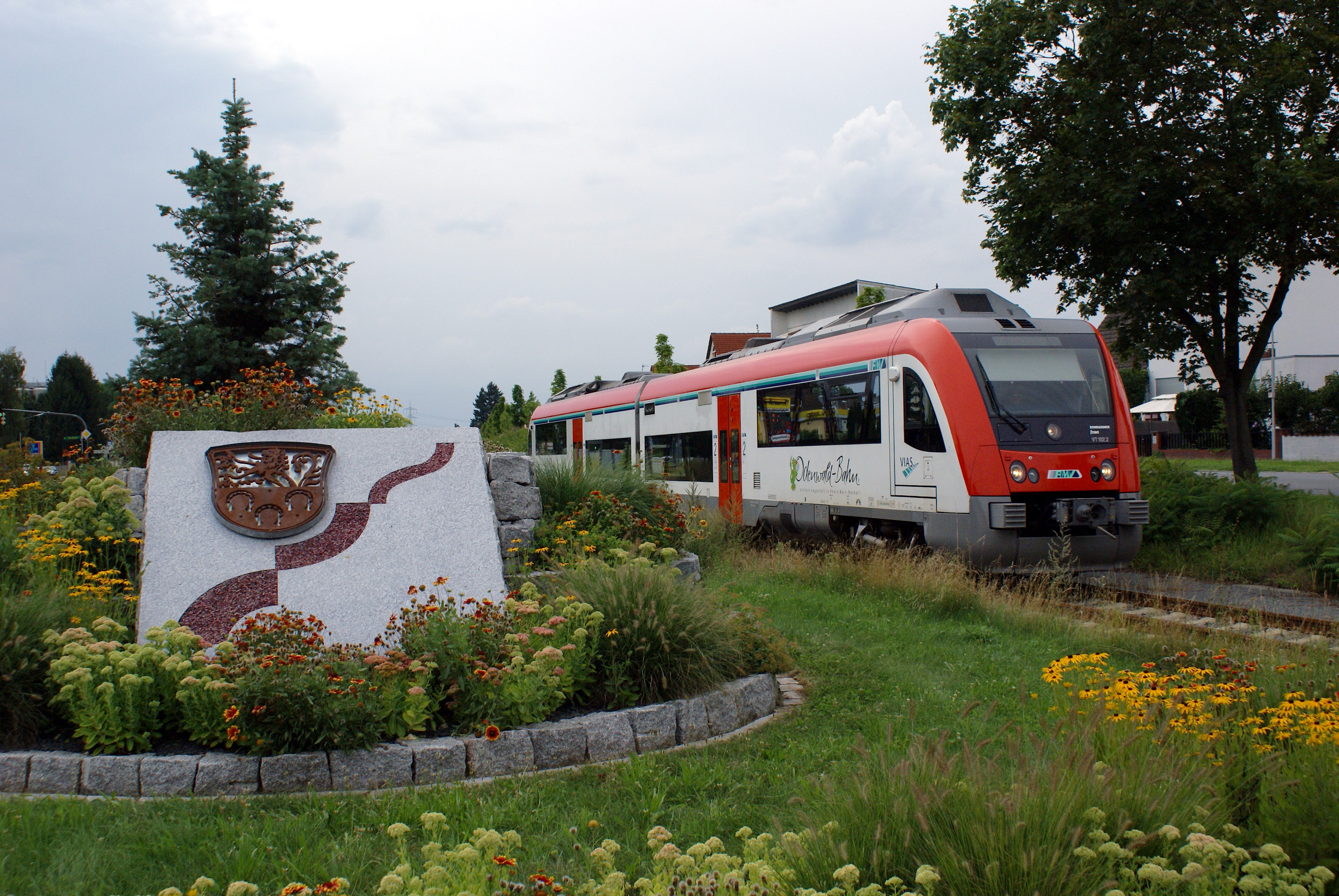
- Bombardier Itino set of VIAS near the exit from Pfungstadt station

Overview
- Native name: Pfungstadtbahn
- Line number: 650.1
- Locale: Hesse, Germany

Service
- Route number: 3543

Technical
- Line length: 1.7 km (1.1 mi)
- Number of tracks: 1
- Track gauge: 1,435 mm (4 ft 8 1/2 in) standard gauge
- Minimum radius: >190 m (620 ft)
- Operating speed: 100 km/h (62 mph)
- Maximum incline: 1.5%

The Pfungstadt Railway (Pfungstadtbahn) is a single-track branch line that branches off the Main-Neckar Railway in Darmstadt-Eberstadt and runs to a station on the eastern edge of the inner town of Pfungstadt, in Hesse, Germany.

== History ==
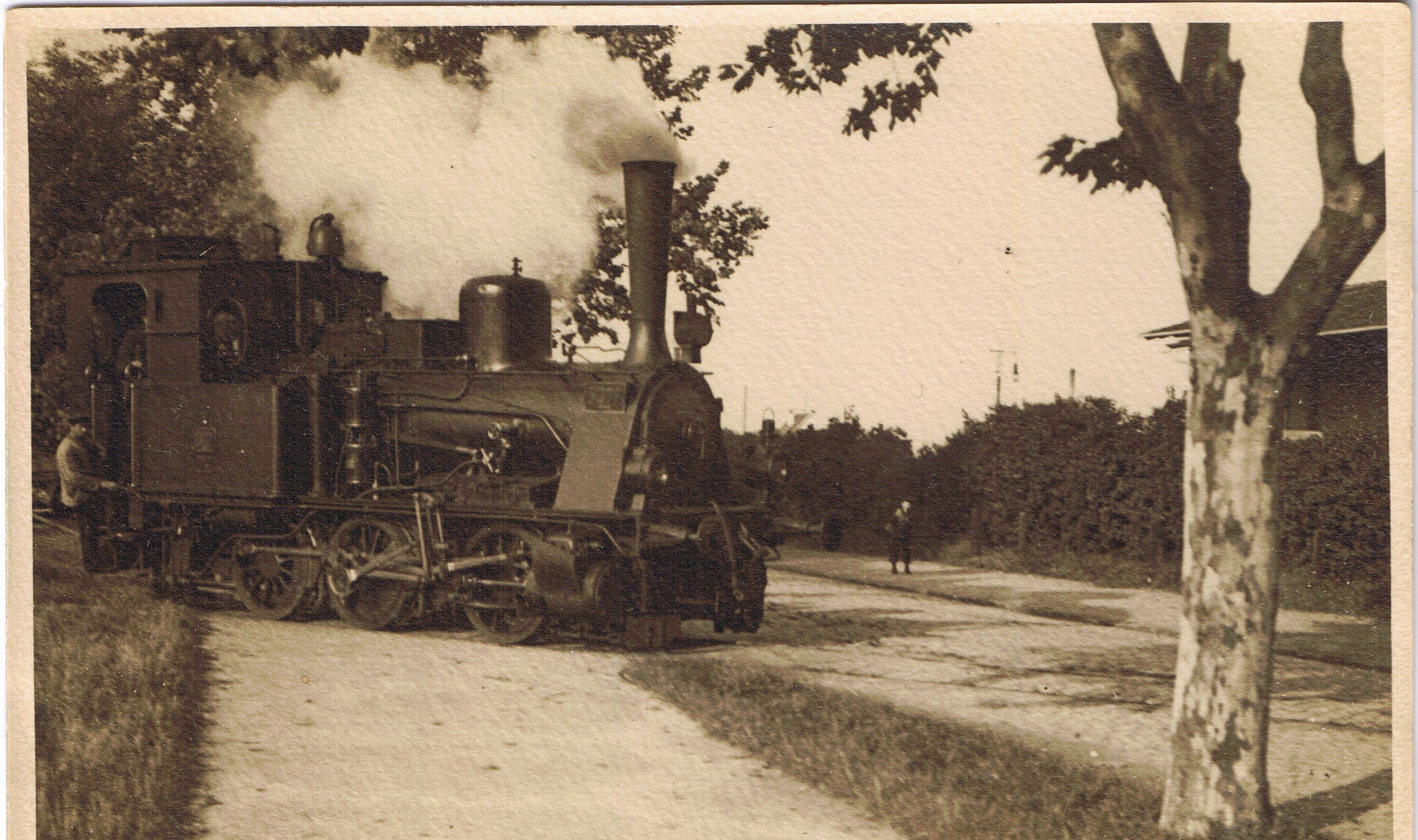
Exit of a T3 locomotive from the grounds of the brewery. Taken by Ernst Büchner, ca. 1914

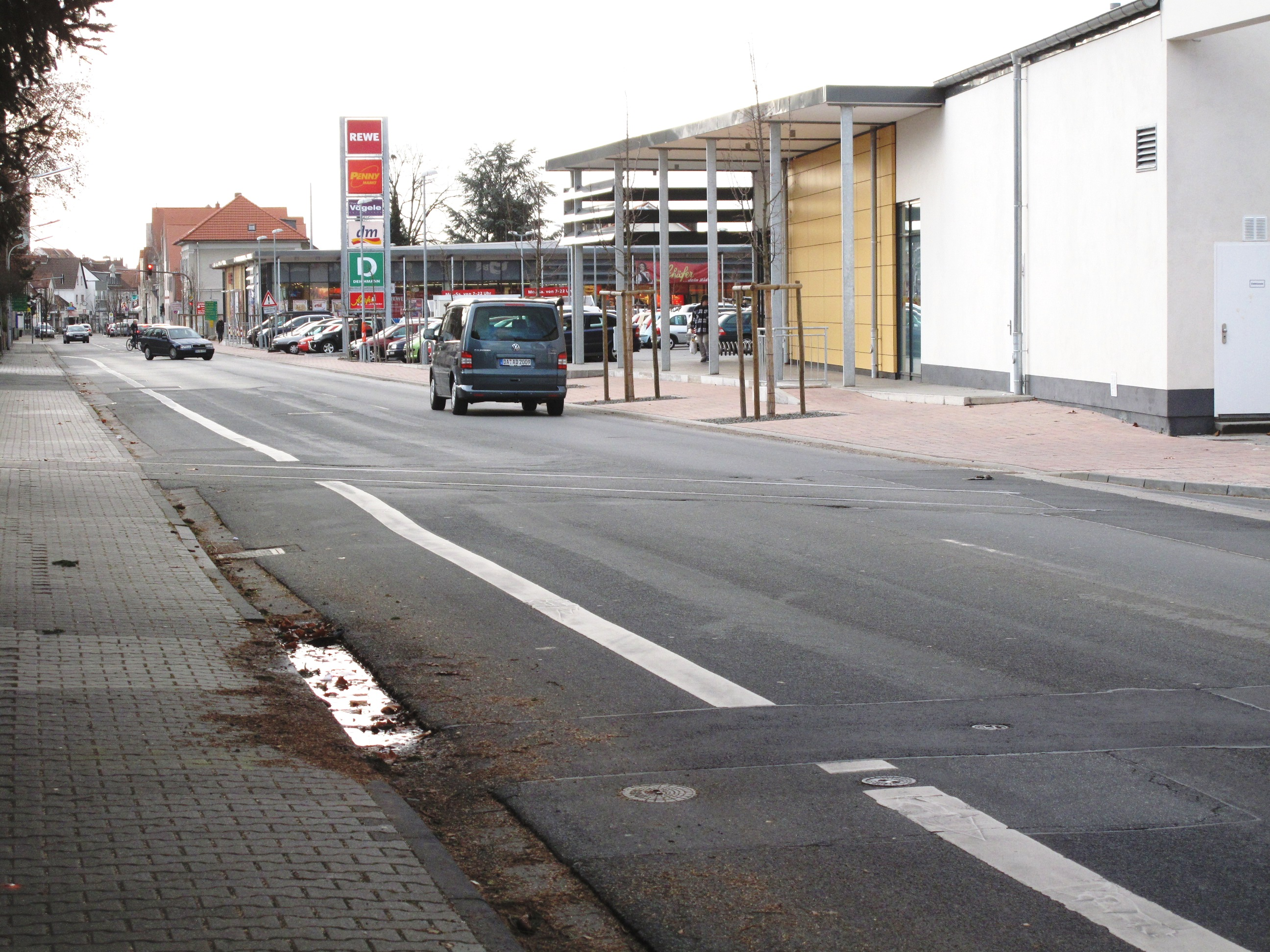
The former siding to the brewery in 2011 from about the same camera location as in 1914. The track had been removed on the right-hand side of the road.

The Pfungstadt industrialists Wilhelm Büchner (who made ultramarine fabric) and Justus Hildebrand (who owned the Pfungstadt brewery) had advocated for the construction of the line since the mid-19th century. Various alternative routes were considered, as well as a possible extension on a curve to Bickenbach, which was rejected for cost reasons. The project was discussed for 22 years from 1864. The line was finally built by the State Railways of the Grand Duchy of Hesse (Großherzoglich Hessischen Staatseisenbahnen). The Main-Neckar Railway was not chosen to build it because it was then still a Kondominalbahn (condominium railway) that was owned by several states and had its own administration.

The line was opened as a Secundärbahn (secondary railway) on 20 December 1886 and Pfungstadt was incorporated as a municipality at the same time. The line proved to be an economic success for both the railway company and the industrial area. It was Deutsche Reichsbahn's shortest timetable route. The siding to the site of the ultramarine fabric factory, which was built with the railway, was dismantled in the 1930s.

Deutsche Bundesbahn abandoned passenger services on 30 April 1955, but freight traffic (mainly wood and sugar beet) continued to 31 May 1997. At the end of the decline of the sugar beet traffic in the early 1990s, this was little traffic. The last timetable number for the passenger service before traffic ended was 315d.

== Recommissioning ==
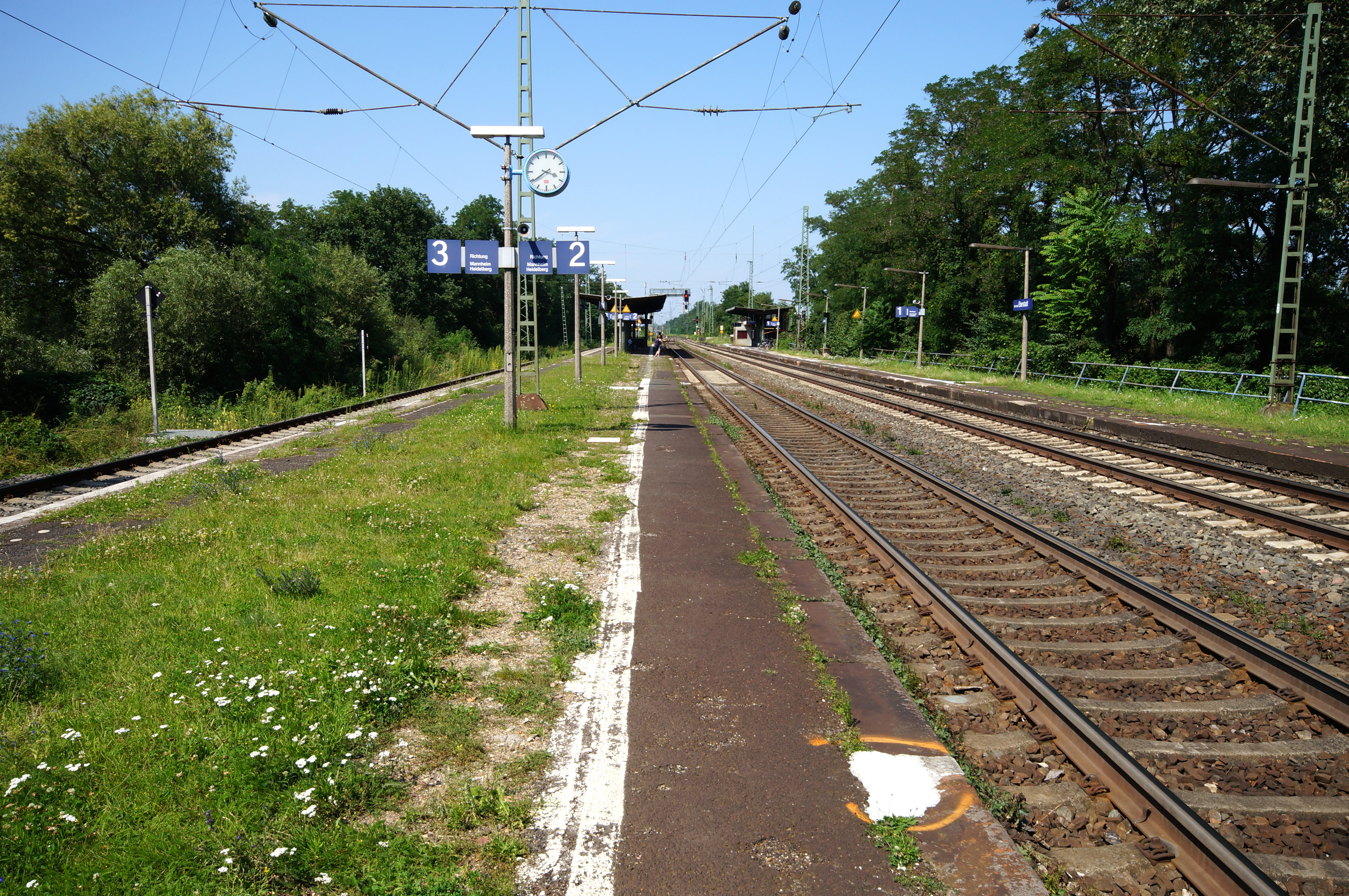
Darmstadt-Eberstadt station

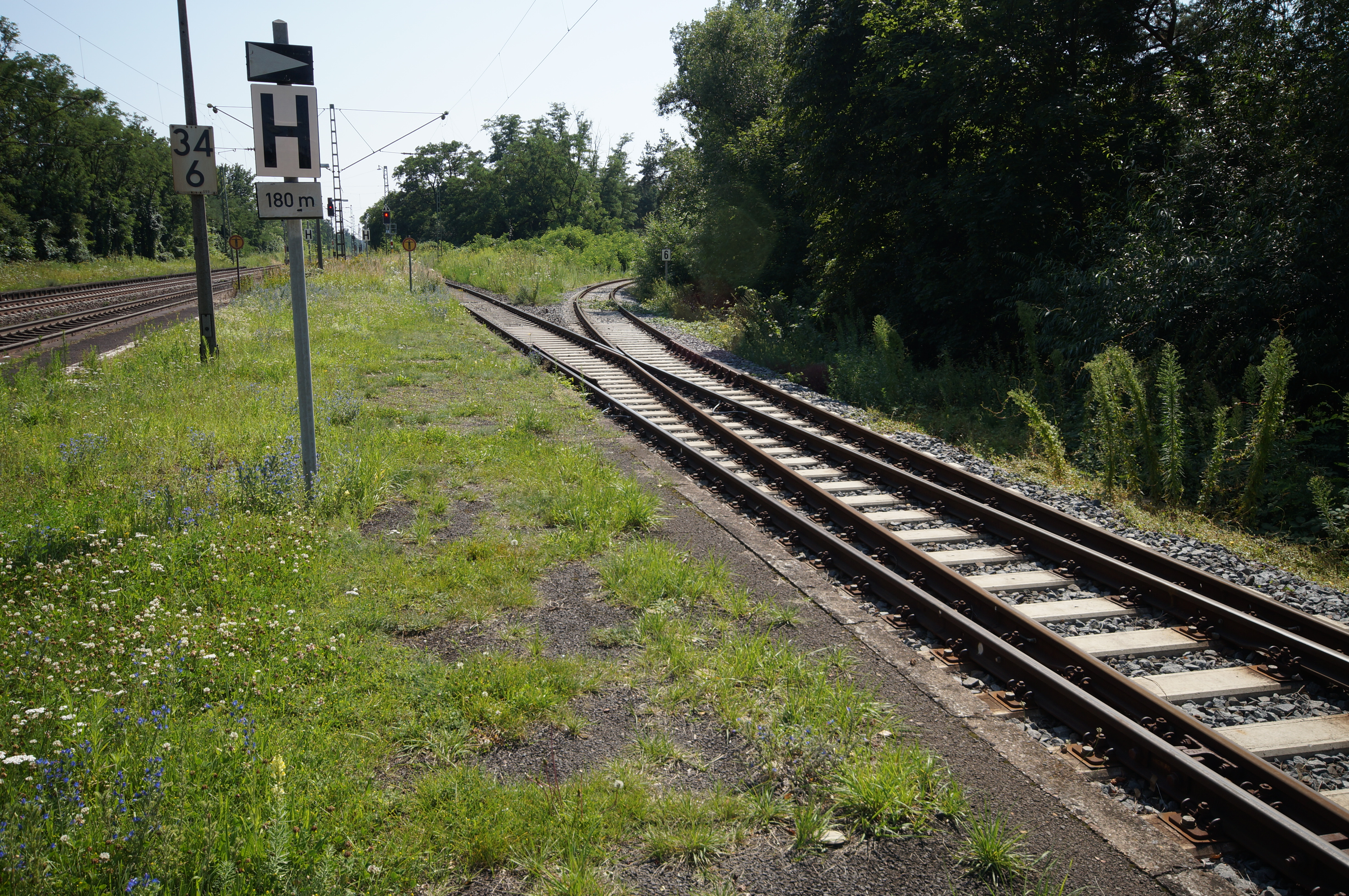
The track of the Pfungstadt Railway, which branches off from Darmstadt-Eberstadt station to Pfungstadt

=== Construction ===
The Darmstadt-Dieburger Nahverkehrsorganisation (Darmstadt-Dieburg local transport organisation, Dadina for short) decided that it would put the disused line back into service and integrate it into the Odenwald Railway. Initially scheduled for competition in December 2007, the reactivation was delayed due to necessary signalling changes at Darmstadt Hauptbahnhof and difficulties with a level crossing in Pfungstadt. The same level crossing, which is located just before the end of the line, was restored and not—as appeared likely in the meantime—replaced by an underpass or made unnecessary by shortening the line. The costs for reactivating the line were borne by the Federal Government and the state of Hesse. The total cost was valued at €7 million, of which €4.2 million was spent on the laying out of the 1.8 km-long track, which was organised by DB Netz. The annual operating cost, which is estimated to amount to €900,000, is shared by the Rhein-Main-Verkehrsverbund (Rhine-Main transport association, RMV) and Dadina. The line was commissioned at the 2011/2012 timetable change on 11 December 2011.

=== Operating program ===
The route is operated by the railway company VIAS, the operator of the Odenwald Railway, which begins in Darmstadt. Every second train of the Odenwald Railway that arrives at Darmstadt Hauptbahhnof, continues to Pfungstadt. However, these have to stay in Darmstadt for about 20 minutes before continuing. There are intermediate services that only shuttle between Darmstadt and Pfungstadt. The two lines are shown separately in the timetable: while the Odenwald Railway service is operated as RMV line 65 (RB 65), the Pfungstadt Railway service has been given the number 66. The line is listed as route 650.1 in the Deutsche Bahn timetable.

The journey to Pfungstadt takes 12 minutes with stops in Darmstadt Süd and Darmstadt-Eberstadt.

An order for four more diesel multiple units for the Odenwald Railway, placed by the Rhein-Main-Verkehrsverbund in November 2007, provided an additional Itino set for the extension to Pfungstadt.

The Pro Bahn association criticised the thin service on the weekend and the early last service in the evening as being a "half-hearted offer".

== Pfungstadt station ==
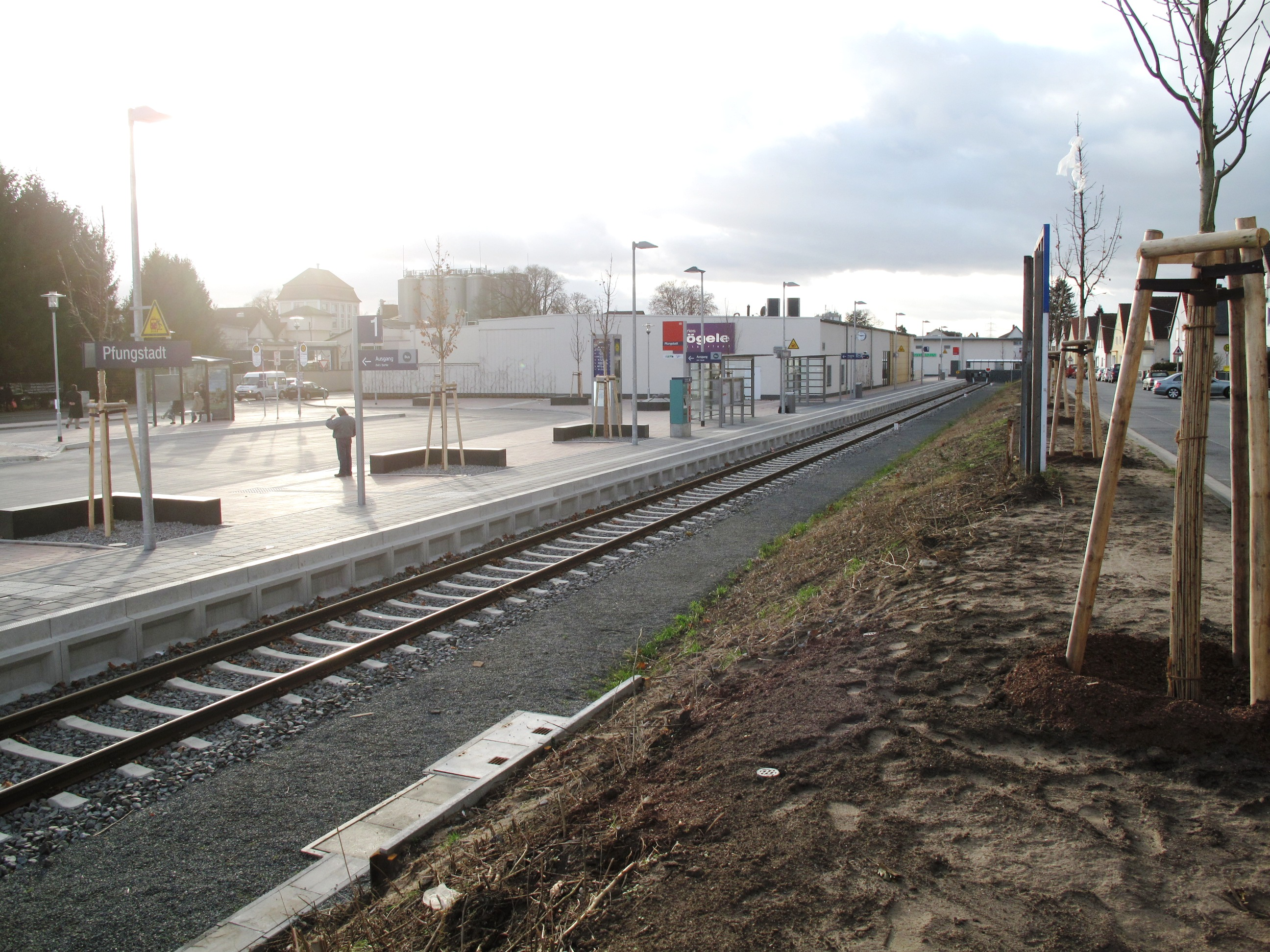
Pfungstadt station in December 2011

Pfungstadt station was opened at the same time as the railway. This was taken by Grand Duke Louis IV of Hesse-Darmstadt as an opportunity to give Pfungstadt town privileges. The original station building has been demolished. A new, simply-equipped station with a 140-metre-long platform was built on the foundations of the historic station for the reactivation. Access for local traffic is provided by a terminal loop and a park and ride parking area. Of the total costs of €2.8 million, the state of Hesse assumed €170,000 and the rest was shared by the town and the federal government.
