= List of German transport associations =

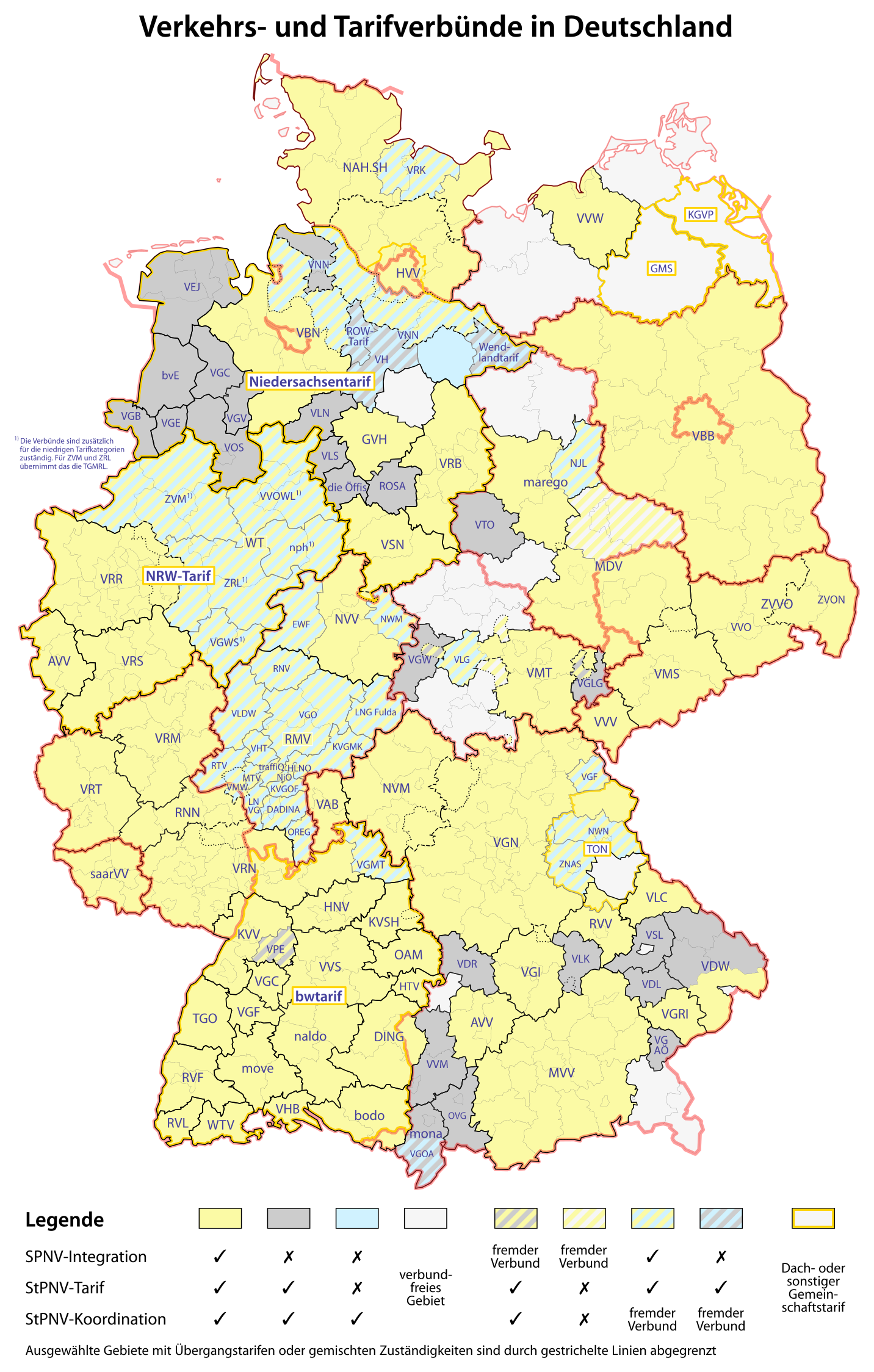
Transport associations in Germany

== Baden-Württemberg ==
- bodo Bodensee-Oberschwaben Verkehrsverbund
- DING Donau-Iller-Nahverkehrsverbund (reaches into Bavaria)
- HNV Heilbronner Hohenloher Haller Nahverkehr
- HTV Heidenheimer Tarifverbund
- KVS KreisVerkehr Schwäbisch Hall
- KVV Karlsruher Verkehrsverbund (reaches into Rhineland-Palatinate)
- naldo Verkehrsverbund Neckar-Alb-Donau
- RVF Regio-Verkehrsverbund Freiburg
- RVL Regio Verkehrsverbund Lörrach
- TGO Tarifverbund Ortenau Home page
- TUTicket Verkehrsverbund Tuttlingen
- VGC Verkehrsgesellschaft Bäderkreis Calw
- VGF Verkehrs-Gemeinschaft Landkreis Freudenstadt
- VGS Verkehrsgemeinschaft Stauferkreis Home page
- VHB Verkehrsverbund Hegau-Bodensee
- VPE Verkehrsverbund Pforzheim-Enzkreis
- VRN Verkehrsverbund Rhein-Neckar (reaches into Hesse, Rhineland-Palatinate and France)
- VSB Verkehrsverbund Schwarzwald-Baar
- VVR Verkehrsverbund Rottweil Home page
- VVS Verkehrs- und Tarifverbund Stuttgart
- WTV Waldshuter Tarifverbund

== Bavaria ==

VU in Hanau, Germany

- AVV Augsburger Verkehrs- und Tarifverbund
- DING Donau-Iller-Nahverkehrsverbund (reaches into Baden-Württemberg)
- MVV Münchner Verkehrs- und Tarifverbund
- RVV Regensburger Verkehrsverbund
- SVV Salzburger Verkehrsverbund (reaches from Austria)
- VAB Verkehrsgemeinschaft am Bayerischen Untermain Home page
- VGN Verkehrsverbund Großraum Nürnberg
- VGRI Verkehrsgemeinschaft Rottal-Inn Home page
- VLC Verkehrsgemeinschaft Landkreis Cham
- VLP Verkehrsgemeinschaft Landkreis PassauHome page
- VVM Verkehrsverbund Mainfranken

== Berlin ==
- VBB Verkehrsverbund Berlin-Brandenburg (reaches into Brandenburg)

== Brandenburg ==
- VBB Verkehrsverbund Berlin-Brandenburg (reaches into Berlin)

== Bremen ==
- VBN Verkehrsverbund Bremen-Niedersachsen (reaches into Lower Saxony)

== Hamburg ==
- HVV Hamburger Verkehrsverbund (reaches into Lower Saxony and Schleswig-Holstein)

== Hesse ==
- NVV Nordhessischer Verkehrsverbund
- RMV Rhein-Main-Verkehrsverbund (reaches into Rhineland-Palatinate)
- RNN Rhein-Nahe-Nahverkehrsverbund (reaches into Rhineland-Palatinate)
- VRN Verkehrsverbund Rhein-Neckar (reaches into Baden-Württemberg and Rhineland-Palatinate)

== Lower Saxony ==
- HVV Hamburger Verkehrsverbund (reaches into Hamburg and Schleswig-Holstein)
- GVH Großraum-Verkehr Hannover
- VBN Verkehrsverbund Bremen-Niedersachsen (reaches into Bremen)
- VEJ Verkehrsverbund Ems-Jade Home page
- VRB Verbundtarif Region Braunschweig
- VSN Verkehrsverbund Süd-Niedersachsen Home page

== Mecklenburg-Western Pomerania ==
- LTV Ludwigsluster Tarifverbund
- VVW Verkehrsverbund Warnow
- VVW Verkehrsverbund Westmecklenburg

== North Rhine-Westphalia ==
- Statewide (travel between transport associations): NRW-Tarif
  - VRR Verkehrsverbund Rhein-Ruhr
    - 2012 former VGN Verkehrsgemeinschaft Niederrhein / NVN Nahverkehrs-Zweckverband Niederrhein was merged into VRR
  - Westfalentarif / Zweckverband Nahverkehr Westfalen-Lippe
    - NPH Nahverkehrsverbund Paderborn-Höxter (Hochstift-Tarif)
    - VGM Verkehrsgemeinschaft Münsterland / ZVM Zweckverband SPNV Münsterland
    - VGWS Verkehrsgemeinschaft Westfalen-Süd / ZWS Zweckverband Personennahverkehr Westfalen Süd#
    - VRL Verkehrsgemeinschaft Ruhr-Lippe / ZRL Zweckverband SPNV Ruhr-Lippe
    - VVOWL Verkehrsverbund OstWestfalenLippe (Der Sechser)
  - Zweckverband go.Rheinland
    - AVV Aachener Verkehrsverbund
    - VRS Verkehrsverbund Rhein-Sieg Home page

== Rhineland-Palatinate ==
- KVV Karlsruher Verkehrsverbund (reaches into Baden-Württemberg)
- RMV Rhein-Main-Verkehrsverbund (reaches into Hesse)
- RNN Rhein-Nahe-Nahverkehrsverbund (reaches into Hesse)
- VRN Verkehrsverbund Rhein-Neckar (reaches into Baden-Württemberg and Hesse)
- VRM Verkehrsverbund Rhein-Mosel
- VRT Verkehrsverbund Region Trier

== Saarland ==
- saarVV Saarländischer Verkehrsverbund Home page

== Saxony ==
- MDV Mitteldeutscher Verkehrsverbund (reaches into Saxony-Anhalt and Thuringia)
- VMS Verkehrsverbund Mittelsachsen
- VVO Verkehrsverbund Oberelbe
- ZVON Zweckverband Verkehrsverbund Oberlausitz-Niederschlesien
- VVV Verkehrsverbund Vogtland

== Saxony-Anhalt ==
- marego Magdeburger Regionalverkehrsverbund
- MDV Mitteldeutscher Verkehrsverbund (reaches into Saxony and Thuringia)

== Schleswig-Holstein ==
- Schleswig-Holstein-Tarif: Statewide, travel between transport associations
- HVV Hamburger Verkehrsverbund (reaches into Hamburg and Lower Saxony)
- TGL Tarifgemeinschaft Lübeck
- VRK Verkehrsverbund Region Kiel (no own tariffs)

== Thuringia ==
- MDV Mitteldeutscher Verkehrsverbund (reaches into Saxony and Saxony-Anhalt)
- VMT Verkehrsverbund Mittelthüringen
