= Trams in Kassel =

Coordinates: 51°19′N 09°30′E

Kassel tramway network
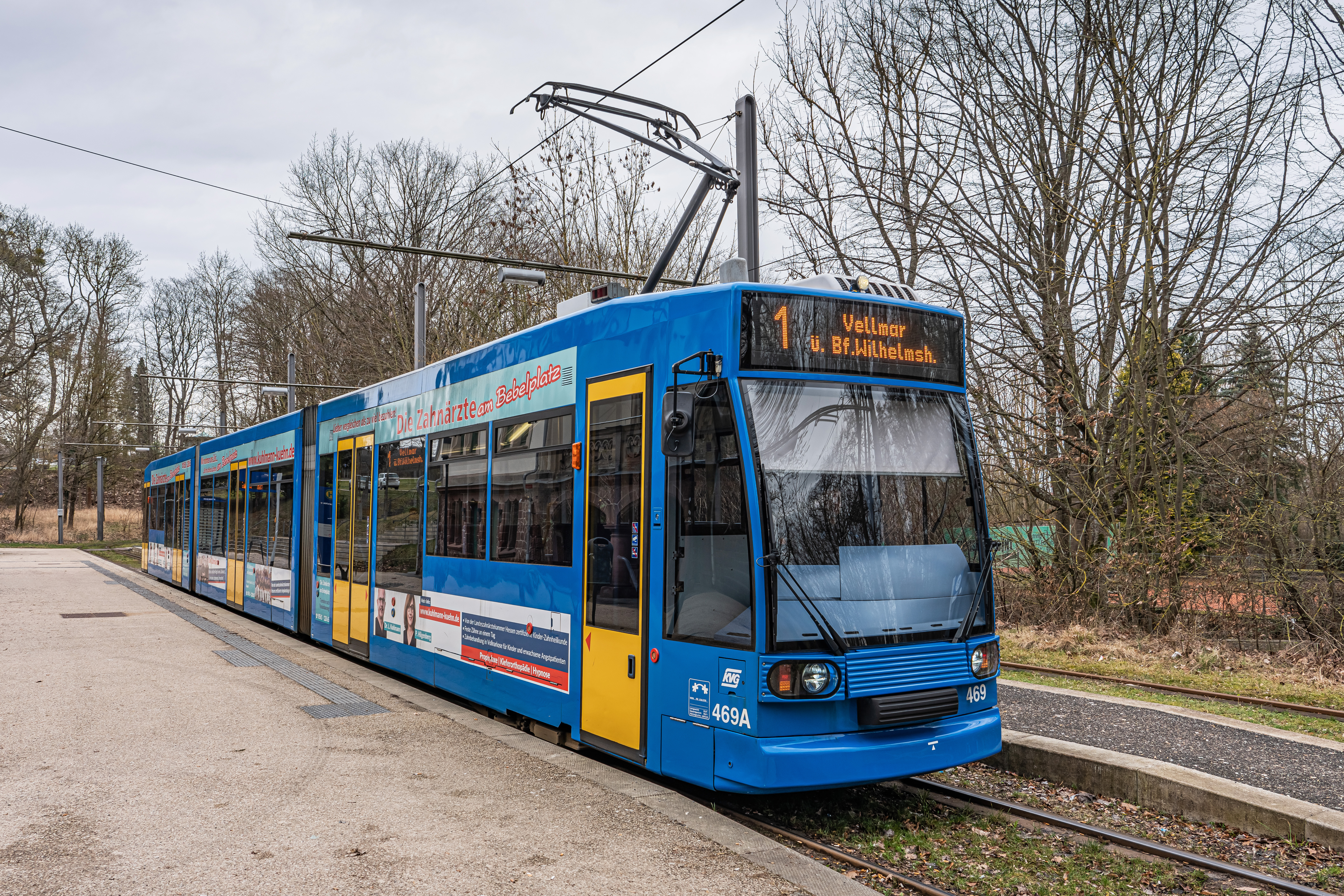

Operation
- Locale: Kassel, Hesse, Germany

Statistics
Steam tram era: 1877–1897
- Status: Converted to electricity
- Operators: Cassel Tramways Company; Casseler-Straßenbahn-Gesellschaft
- Track gauge: 1,435 mm (4 ft 8 1/2 in) standard gauge
- Propulsion system: steam
Horsecar era: 1884–1909
- Status: Converted to electricity
- Track gauge: 1,435 mm (4 ft 8 1/2 in) standard gauge
- Propulsion system: Horses
Electric tram era: since 1897
- Status: Operational
- Lines: 7 (5 local + 2 regional)
- Operator: Kasseler Verkehrs-Gesellschaft (KVG) (since 1897)
- Track gauge: 1,435 mm (4 ft 8 1/2 in) standard gauge
- Propulsion system: electricity
- Electrification: 600 V DC overhead lines
- Route length: 93.3 km (58.0 mi)
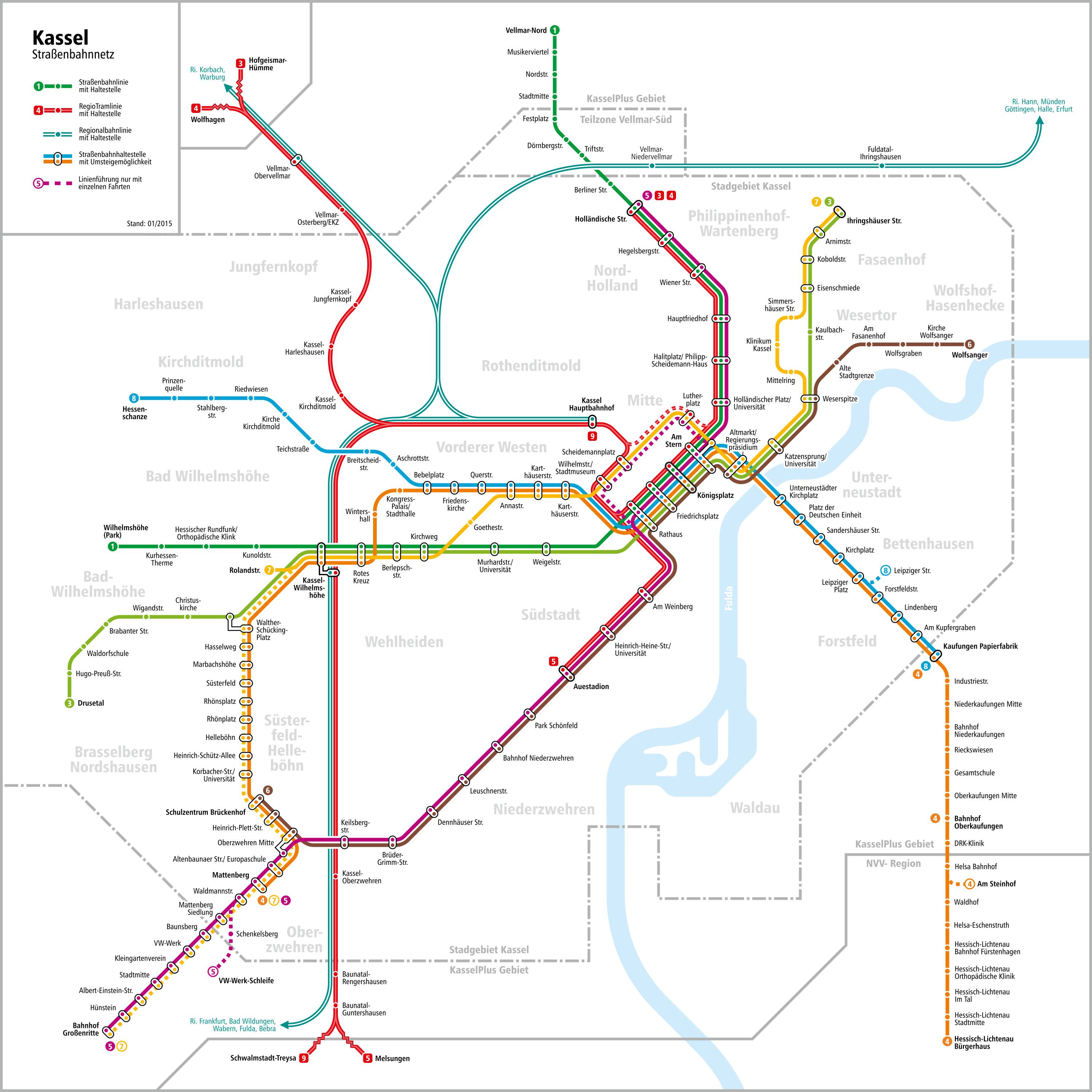
- Website: Kasseler Verkehrs-Gesellschaft (in German)

The Kassel tramway network is a 93.3-kilometer (58.0 mi) network of tramways, forming part of the public transport system in Kassel, a city in the north of the federal state of Hesse, Germany. As of 2014, the Kassel tram network is made up of seven regular tramlines.

Opened in 1877 as a steam tramway from Wilhelmshöhe the Königsplatz (Royal Square), the network has been operated since 1897 by Kasseler Verkehrs-Gesellschaft (KVG), and is integrated in the Nordhessischer Verkehrsverbund (NVV). The track gauge is 1,435 mm (4 ft 8 1/2 in) standard gauge. There existed also a narrow gauge network to the Hercules monument. The network was extended gradually into the surrounding area, partly as conventional tramways, and partly as a tram-train RegioTram network.

== History ==
In the summer of 1870 a horse-drawn omnibus line opened as part of an industrial exhibition from 1 June to 5 October 1870. The growth of the city made it attractive to operate a steam tram which was opened in 1877 by the English company "Jay & Comp. London". With the first two steam locomotives and four passenger cars they brought visitors to the Royal Palace in Wilhelmshöhe. Soon other vehicles, including locomotives made by Henschel, were added to the rolling stock. The Kassel steam train is considered to be the first tramway in Germany not pulled by horses. In 1881 the company was taken over by another company from Berlin which invested in its electrification in 1897.

The "Hercules Rail" was operated separately until 1927 bringing tourists to the Hercules monument.

== System ==
=== Tram lines ===
As of August 2022, the Kassel tram network is made up of seven regular and one additional tramline.

Line	Route	Remarks
Line 1	Wilhelmshöhe – Königsplatz – Vellmar	
Line 2	Brückenhof – Oberzwehren Mitte - Baunatal	Only on schooldays whilst school begins and ends
Line 3	Mattenberg – Murhardstr./Uni – Ihringshäuser Str.	
Line 4	Druseltal – Bebelplatz – Kaufungen – Helsa – Hessisch Lichtenau	Some journeys end at Helsa or Kaufungen
Line 5	Baunatal – Auestadion – Holländische Str.	
Line 6	Brückenhof – Auestadion – Ihringshäuser str	
Line 7	(Mattenberg – ) Bf. Wilhelmshöhe – wolfsanger	Ends at Hauptbahnhof on Weekends
Line 8	Hessenschanze – Bebelplatz – Kaufungen, Papierfabrik	

=== RegioTram ===
In addition, Kassel is served by the three lines of the RegioTram system.

== Rolling stock ==
=== Historic fleet ===
Until 1900 54 railcars were ordered at Van Zypen & Charlier and Crede. From 1955 to 1958 the railcar types "260", "261-288 (2 +2 Tw)" designed by Duewag and built in Kassel were put in service. They were in regular service until 1991. Ten vehicles were given to Gorzow in Poland and later scrapped, one of them went to the Warsaw tram friends. Other presented railcars are in two Dutch railway museums one in Hanover and one in Kassel. The next generation 301-317 and 351-366 was produced by Wegmann in Kassel in the 1960s and in service until 2003. Some of them still exist but are not in regular service any more.

=== Current fleet ===
- 417-422 (Stadtbahnwagen N8C): 16 units produced in 1981 and 6 in 1986 by Duewag - 401-416 sold to Gdańsk - 417, 419, 422 transported to Gdańsk in 2019 - only 3 operational units remaining in Kassel - 418, 420, 421
- 451–475 (NGT6C): 15 units produced from 1990 to 1991 and 10 in 1994 by Duewag
- 601–622 (Flexity Classic 8ENGTW): 22 units delivered by Bombardier from 1999 to 2000
- 631–640 (Flexity Classic 8ZNGTW): 10 units delivered by Bombardier in 2001 and 2003
- 651-672 (Flexity Classic NGT8): 22 units delivered by Bombardier from 2011 to 2013
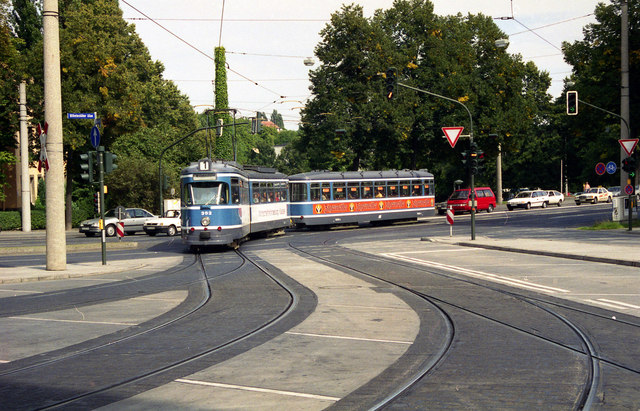
Tram in 1995

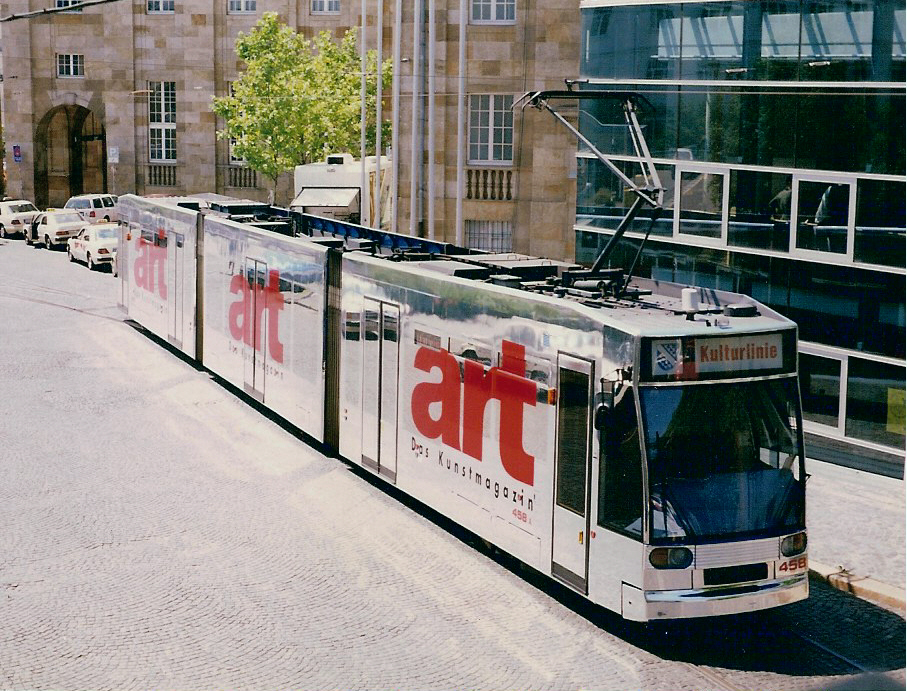
Tram no 458 with art – Das Kunstmagazin
wrap advertising, for documenta X, 1997

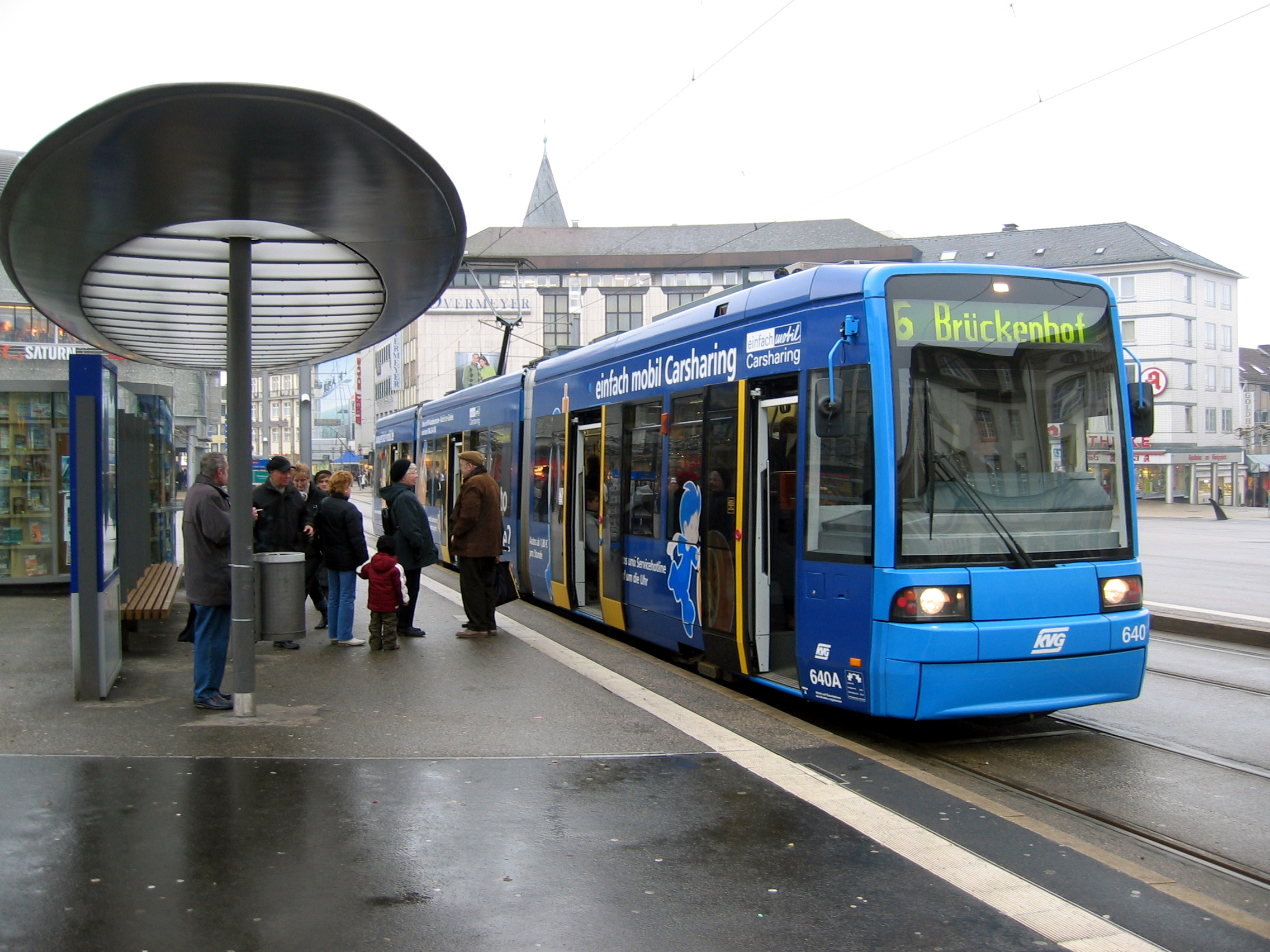
An 8ZNGTW unit at 'önigsplatz

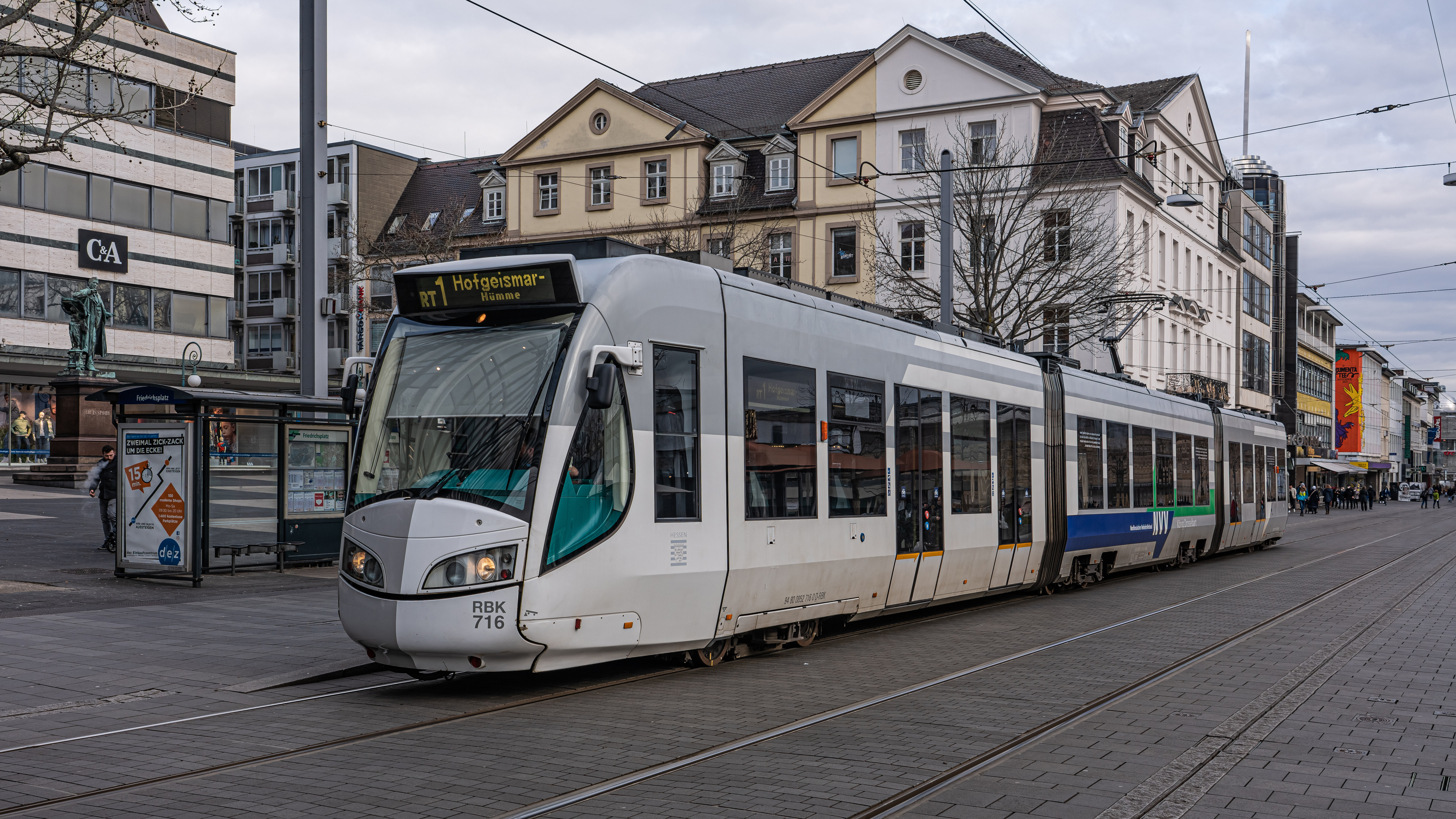
An Alstom RegioCitadis of the Kassel RegioTram

== See also ==
- Kassel RegioTram
- List of town tramway systems in Germany
- Trams in Germany
