= Kassel RegioTram =

Tram system in Kassel, Hesse, Germany

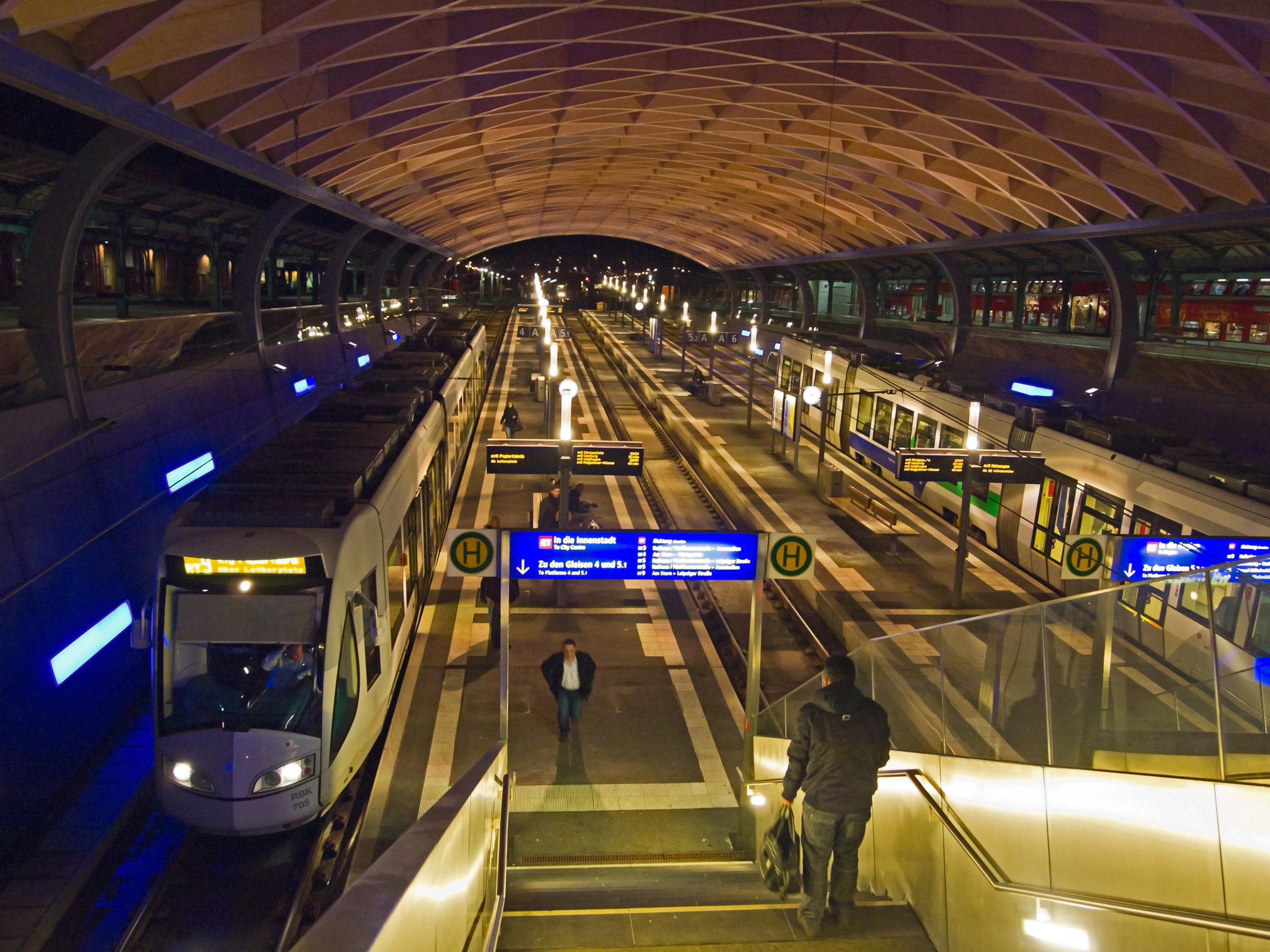
- A RegioTram at the low platforms of Kassel Hauptbahnhof.

Overview
- Locale: Kassel, Hesse, Germany
- Transit type: Tram-train
- Number of lines: 3
- Website: KVG

Operation
- Operator: Regionalbahn Kassel (RBK)
- Number of vehicles: 28 vehicles (see below)
- Train length: 3–cars
- Headway: 15–60 minutes

Technical
- System length: 184 km (114 mi)
- Track gauge: 1,435 mm (4 ft 8 1/2 in) standard gauge
- Electrification: 600 V DC/15 kV AC (18 vehicles); 600 V DC/on-board diesel engine (10 vehicles)

The Kassel RegioTram is a 184-kilometer (114 mi) tram-train light rail system in Kassel, Hesse, Germany.

Kassel's tram-train system follows the Karlsruhe model, and has been in full operation since 2007. With special RegioTram tramcars, continuous trips between the Deutsche Bahn heavy rail network and Kassel's city tram network are easily possible, thus avoiding transfers requiring long walking distances between trains of the regional rail system and trams of the Kassel city system.

The operator of the RegioTram network was, until December 2013, RegioTram mbH, a joint venture between Regionalbahn Kassel (RBK), a subsidiary of the Kasseler Verkehrs-Gesellschaft (KVG), and DB Regio. Since 9 December 2013, the RegioTram is operated by a consortium of the KVG and Hessische Landesbahn (HLB). The system is integrated in the Nordhessischer Verkehrsverbund (NVV).

== Concept ==
The implementation of the RegioTram project includes various interlocking measures to improve local public transport in Kassel. The aim of the project is to link Kassel's local tram network with the regional rail network so that tram-train vehicles can travel from the city's tram network into the surrounding countryside on regional railroad tracks. The core component of the Kassel RegioTram project is a newly created link between the two rail systems at the Kassel Hauptbahnhof. RT1 and RT4 run up to 4 trains per hour, RT5 up to 2 per hour.

== Operations ==
=== Services ===
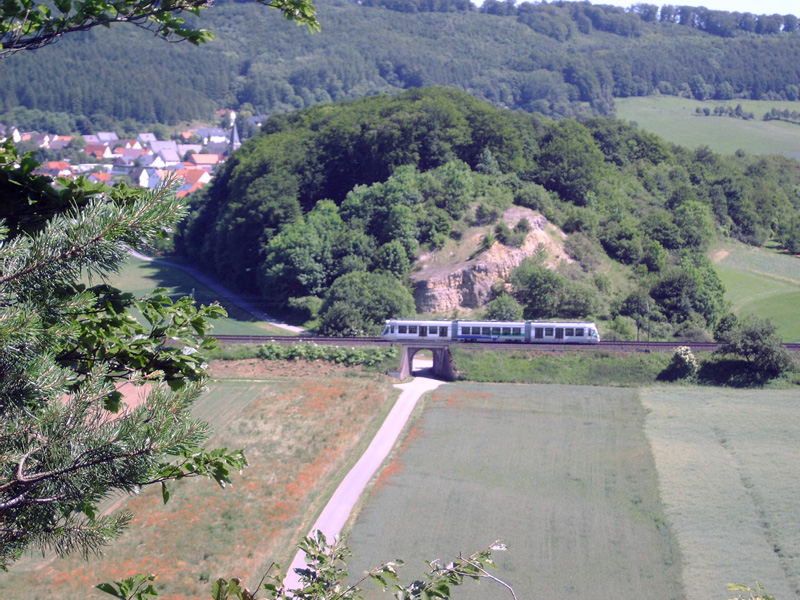
RegioTram train on the route between Kassel and Warburg.

Kassel is served by the three services of the RegioTram system, which operate on 184 kilometers (114 mi) of railway lines of which only six kilometers (four miles) are newly built lines (mostly to link the regional rail network to Kassel city's tram network).

Service	Route	Map
RT1	Hofgeismar-Hümme – Kassel	
RT4	Wolfhagen – Kassel	
RT5	Melsungen – Kassel	

=== Rolling stock ===
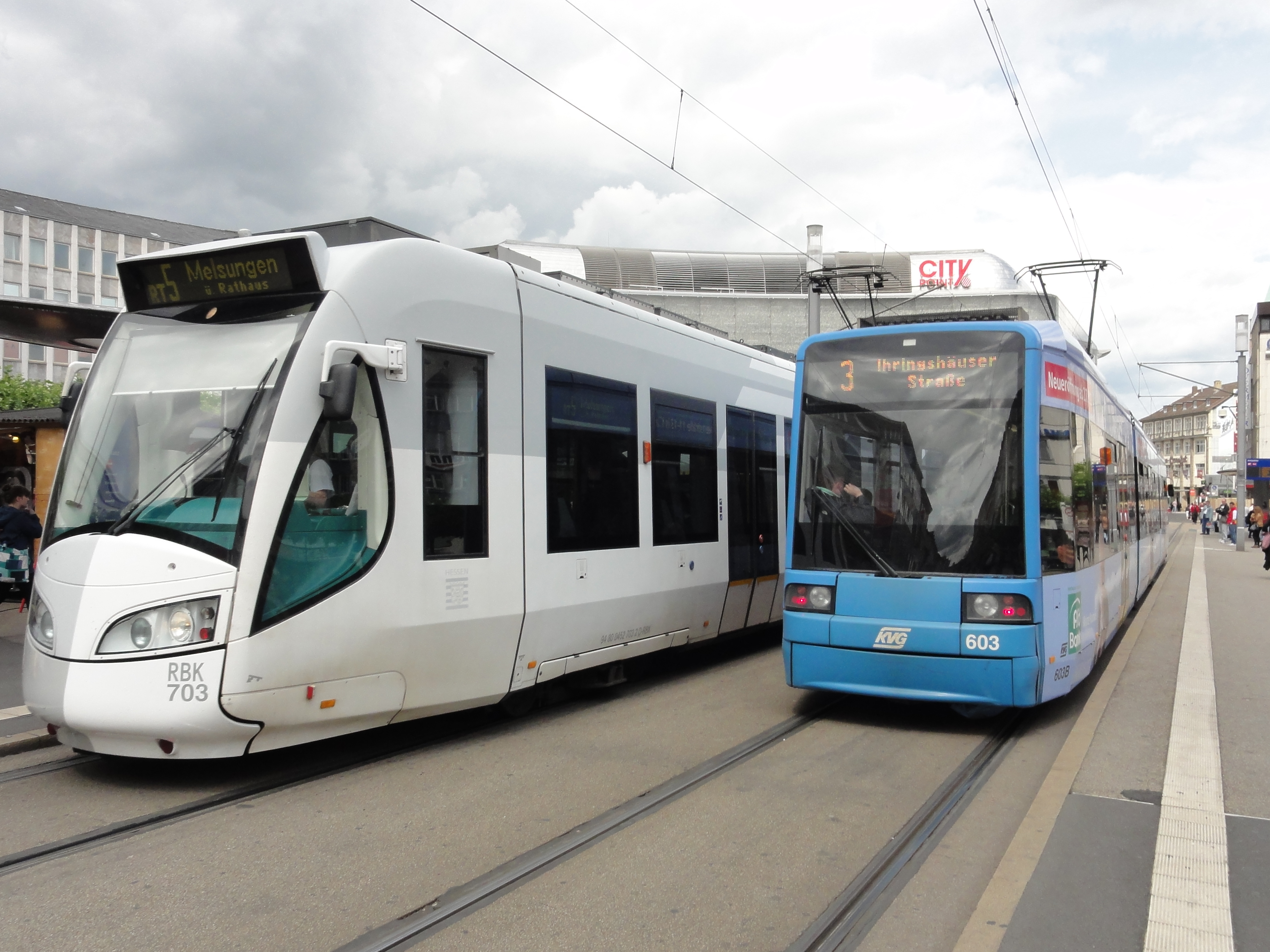
RegioTram Kassel dual voltage DC/AC Alstom RegioCitadis (on left) next to a KVG Bombardier Flexity Classic Kassel tram (on right) at Königsplatz.

RegioTram operates using 28 tramcars from Alstom RegioCitadis delivered in 2004. There are two versions of these tramcars: 18 dual voltage tram-trains for use on the electrified network in and outside of Kassel, and 10 hybrid tram-trains (DC/diesel) for use with a diesel engine outside Kassel on the section around Wolfhagen. Similar vehicles of the same model are also in use on RandstadRail in the Netherlands.

== History ==
Preliminary operations started on 10 June 2001, initially with six borrowed Saarbahn tramcars, on the Warburg–Kassel line. Thus, the previous regional railway timetable was now being served by the new vehicles. RegioTram operation with 30-minute headways was realized. RegioCitadis type vehicles manufactured by Alstom in Salzgitter were delivered in July 2004, and took over the operation on this line on 8 May 2005; the borrowed Saarbahn tramcars were then returned. This route is now served by RegioTram Line 1 (RT1).

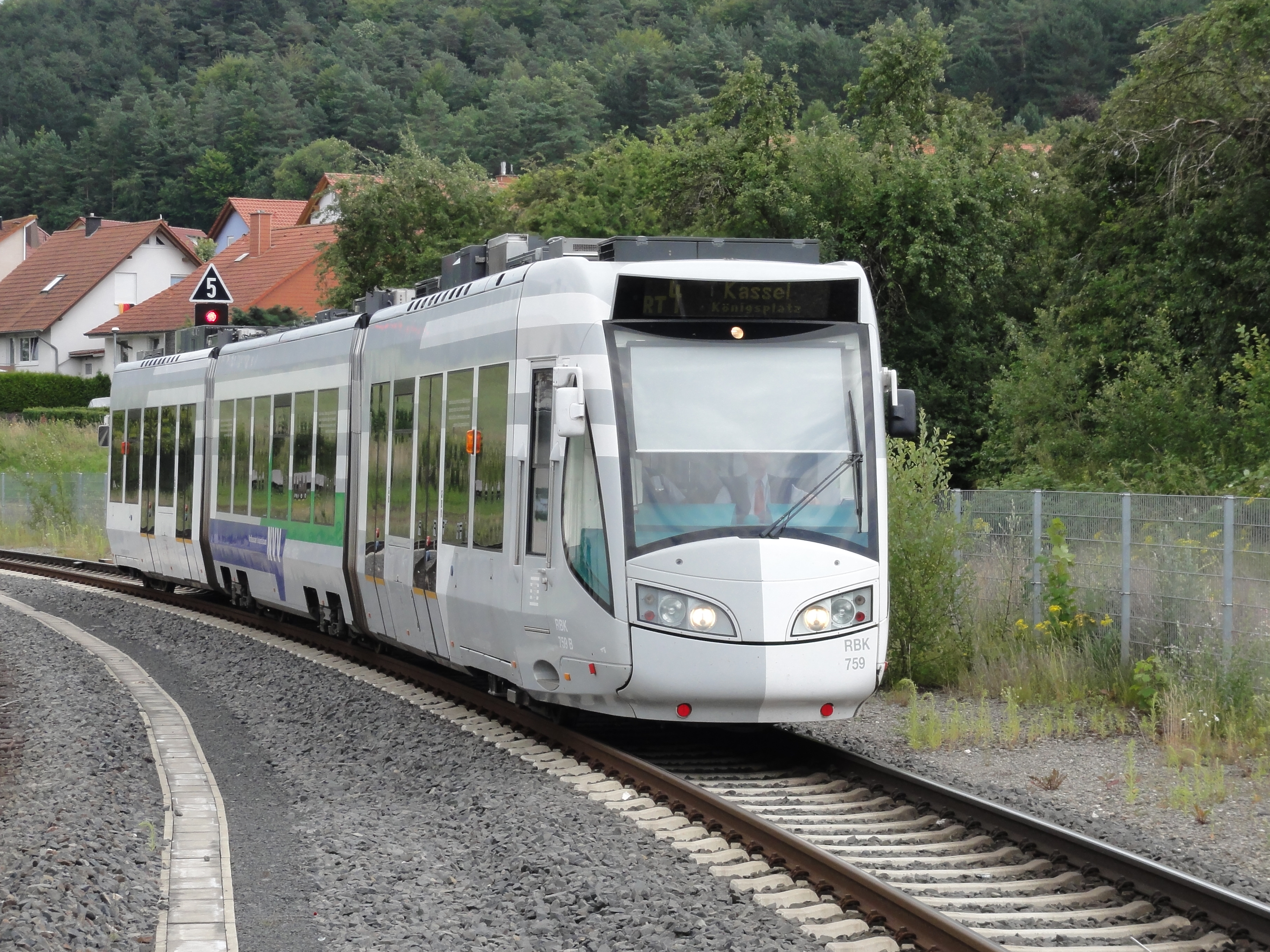
RegioTram Kassel dual mode diesel/electric Alstom RegioCitadis train approaching Wolfhagen using diesel power.

Starting on 29 January 2006, the first RegioTram operations began on the Kassel tram rail network itself. The hybrid RegioTram vehicles joined the tram tracks in the downtown core of Kassel on the Lossetalbahn to Hessisch Lichtenau during peak hours, the terminus of the tram line. The diesel-electric vehicles used a direct route over the Waldkappel rail line between Ober- and Nieder-Kaufungen which is not electrified. This meant, in contrast to the trams which served all stops, a reduction in journey time. In August 2007, the switch to the continuous use of conventional tramcar vehicles on this line was made. The former tram-train runs over the non-electrified railway through Waldkappel were replaced by tram "express" trips that do not operate at all stops along the route.

Starting 1 June 2006, RegioTram operations from Kassel Hauptbahnhof, through Baunatal, Guxhagen and Körle, to Melsungen, began. This RegioTram Line 5 (RT5) runs alternately once and twice every hour.

Operations between Kassel and Wolfhagen, through Ahnatal and Zierenberg, began on 10 December 2006 on RegioTram Line 4 (RT4).

Between 16 September 2007 and the timetable change in December 2007, the RegioTram Line 9 (RT9) operated in advance from Kassel Hauptbahnhof to Treysa.

RegioTram routes in Kassel started running on the Inner City Ring to Leipziger Straße on 19 August 2007 (RT4), 16 September 2007 (RT3 and RT5) and December 2007 (RT9). The full development of the infrastructure to allow for a 30-minute headways on all lines was implemented in December 2013.

On the lines RT3 and RT4, new stops at Kassel-Jungfernkopf, and Vellmar-Osterberg/EKZ on the Harleshäuser Kurve, were put into operation on 13 December 2008. On 25 April 2009, a new station Kassel-Kirchditmold was also added to the same section. In Melsungen, a new stop at Melsungen-Bartenwetzerbrücke was put into operation on the RT5 on 20 May 2011.

In December 2015, the RT9 line to Treysa was discontinued and replaced by Regionalbahn and Regional-Express trains.

== See also ==
- Trams in Kassel
- Tram-train
- List of town tramway systems in Germany
- Trams in Germany
