= Darmstadt-Eberstadt station =

Railway station in Germany

Darmstadt-Eberstadt
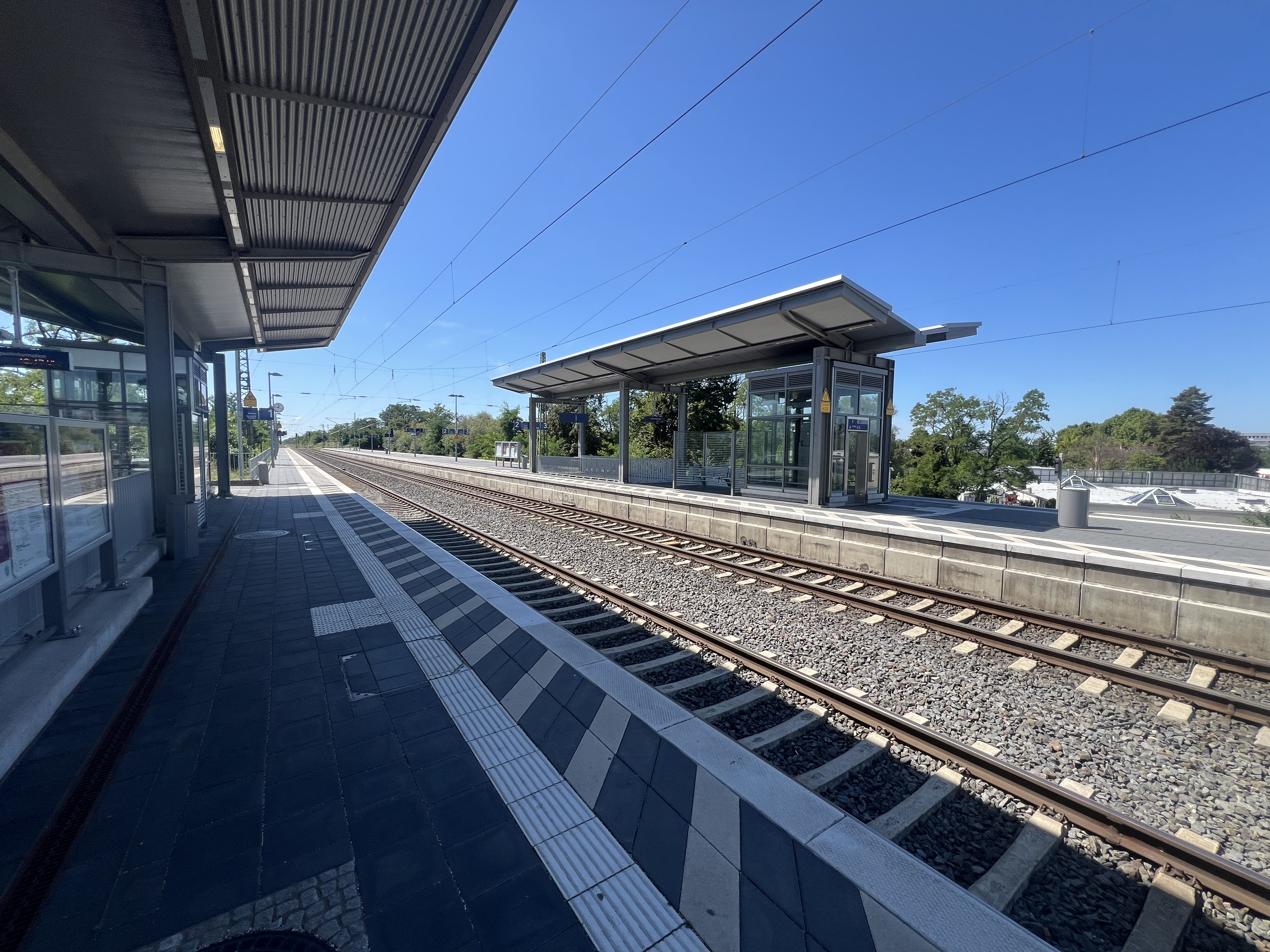
- Looking southwest from platform 1 onto platforms 2 and 3.

General information
- Location: An der Eisenbahn 1; 64297 Darmstadt-Eberstadt; Hesse; Germany
- Coordinates: 49°48′51″N 8°37′33″E
- Owner: DB Netz
- Operator: DB Station&Service
- Lines: Main-Neckar Railway (KBS 650); Pfungstadt Railway (KBS 650.1)
- Platforms: 1 island platform 1 side platform
- Tracks: 3
- Train operators: DB Regio Mitte; VIAS

Other information
- Station code: 1131
- DS100 code: FDE
- IBNR: 8001379
- Category: 4
- Fare zone: : 4045
- Website: www.bahnhof.de

History
- Opened: 1846

Services
Preceding station	DB Regio Mitte	Following station
Darmstadt Süd towards Frankfurt (Main) Hbf	RB 68	Bickenbach (Bergstr) towards Wiesloch-Walldorf
Preceding station	VIAS	Following station
Darmstadt Süd towards Darmstadt Hbf	RB 66	Pfungstadt Terminus
Location
- Location within Hesse

Darmstadt-Eberstadt station is a railway station in the Eberstadt district of the town of Darmstadt, located in Hesse, Germany. The station opened in 1846. The station building was demolished in March 1966 and replaced by a simple entrance structure.
