= Pfungstadt station =

Railway station in Hesse, Germany

Pfungstadt
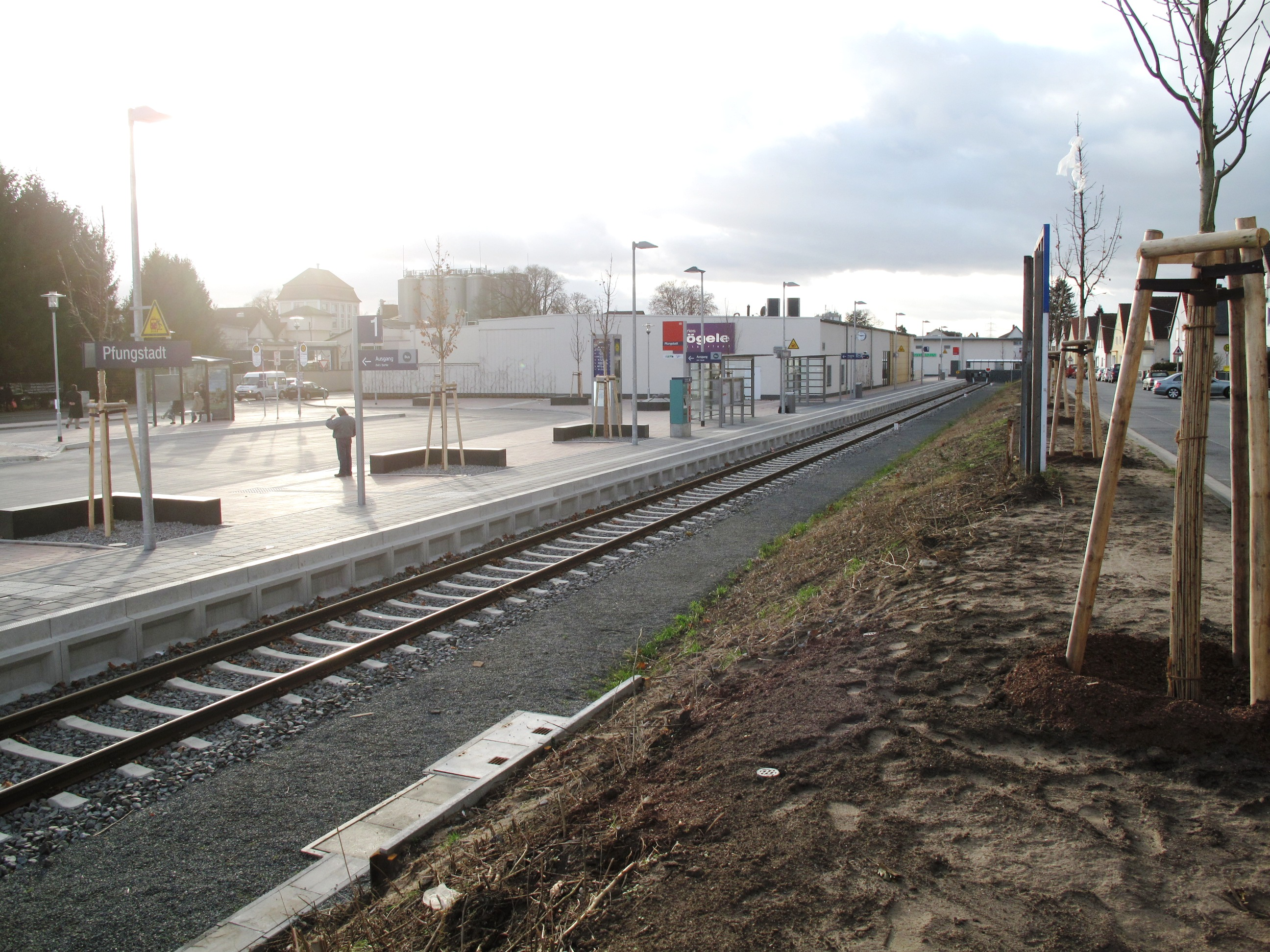

General information
- Location: Eberstädter Straße; 64319 Pfungstadt; Hesse; Germany
- Coordinates: 49°48′23″N 8°36′29″E
- Owner: DB Netz
- Operator: DB Station&Service
- Line: Pfungstadt Railway
- Platforms: 1 side platform
- Tracks: 1
- Train operators: VIAS

Construction
- Accessible: Yes

Other information
- Station code: 8264
- DS100 code: FPU
- IBNR: 8004816
- Category: 6
- Fare zone: : 4050
- Website: www.bahnhof.de

History
- Opened: 1886

Services
Preceding station	VIAS	Following station
Darmstadt-Eberstadt towards Darmstadt Hbf	RB 66	Terminus
Location
- Location within Hesse

Pfungstadt station is a railway station in the municipality of Pfungstadt, located in the Darmstadt-Dieburg district in Hesse, Germany.

== History ==
The station was opened with the Pfungstadt Railway by the Grand Duchy of Hesse State Railways in 1886. This was taken by Grand Duke Louis IV of Hesse-Darmstadt as an opportunity to give Pfungstadt town privileges. The original station building has been demolished. A new, simply-equipped station with a 140 metre-long platform was built on the foundations of the historic station for the reactivation. Access for local traffic is provided by a terminal loop and a park and ride parking area. Of the total costs of €2.8 million, the state of Hesse assumed €170,000 and the rest was shared by the town and the federal government.
