= Nordhessischer Verkehrsverbund =

Logo of the Nordhessischer Verkehrsverbund.

The Nordhessischer Verkehrsverbund (NVV) is a transport association that organises the cooperation of more than 40 North Hessian transport companies, such as supra-regional public transport and regional rail passenger transport. The Verkehrsverbund und Fördergesellschaft Nordhessen mbH is responsible for this.

The network covers an area of approximately 7000 km^{2} with a network of 7113 km, 84 stations/stops and 5608 stop positions. Bus and train lines, Kassel's tram system, and the Kassel RegioTram light rail system operate in the NVV area. The NVV was established on 13 July 1994 and took effect on 1 May 1995.

== Public agency/Supply area ==
The following local authorities have joined forces to act as sponsors of the NVV:

- Kassel urban district
- Hersfeld-Rotenburg district
- Kassel district
- Waldeck-Frankenberg district
- Schwalm-Eder-Kreis
- Werra-Meißner-Kreis

as well as

- the State of Hesse.

== Transport companies ==
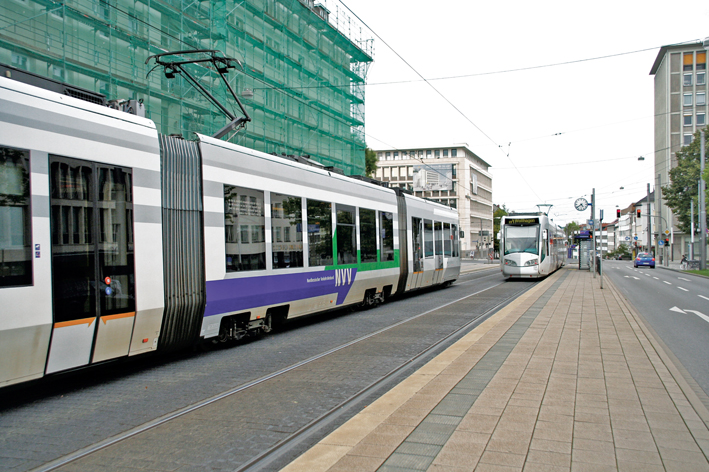
A RegioTram in Kassel with a logo of the NVV.

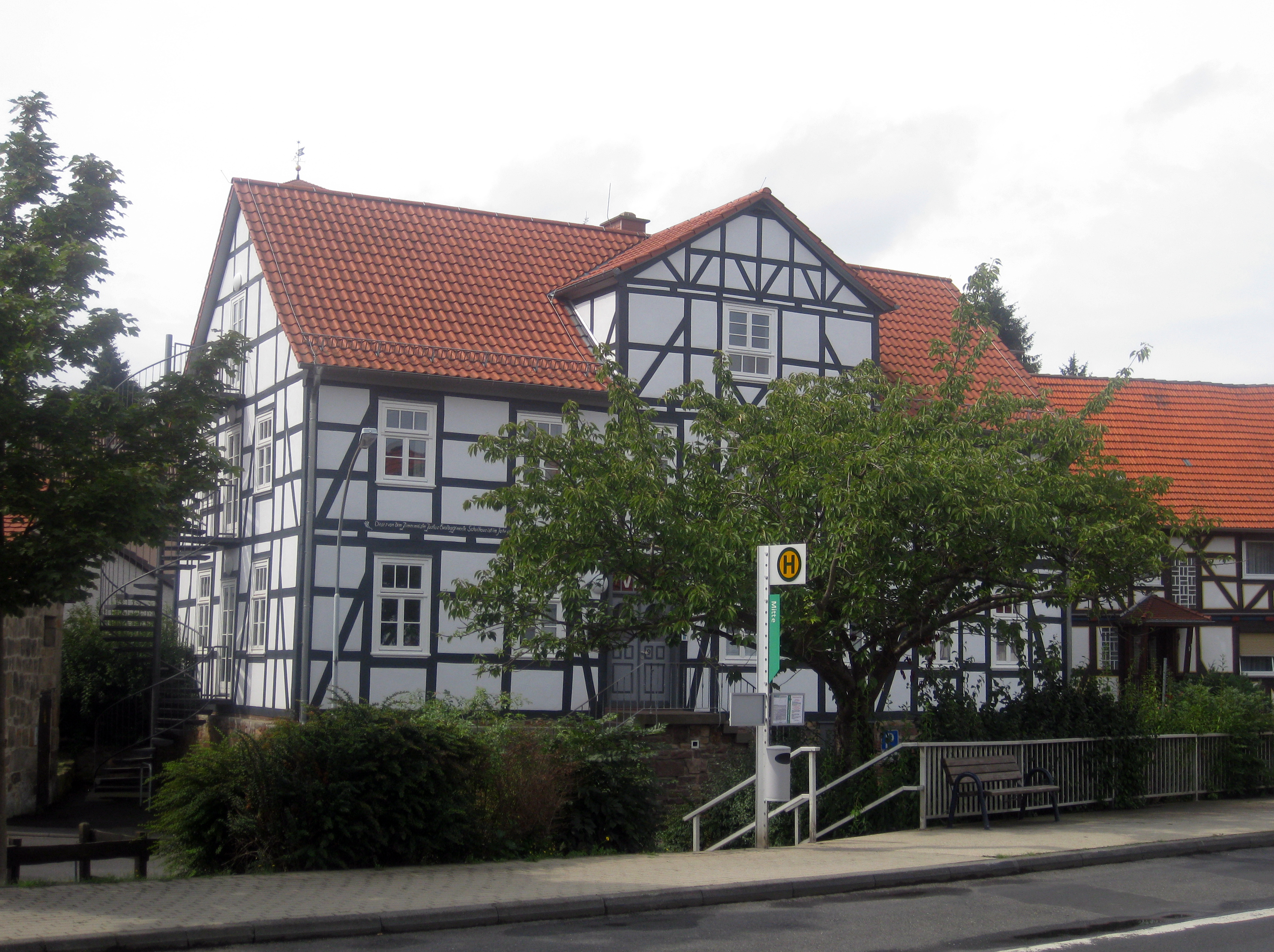
A stop of the NVV (at Lohfelden).

- Auto Nau GmbH & Co. KG
- Bad Wildunger Kraftwagenverkehrs- und Wasserversorgungsgesellschaft mbH
- cantus Verkehrsgesellschaft mbH
- DB Regio AG (DB Regio Mitte)
- Energie Waldeck-Frankenberg GmbH
- EOV Frölich
- EW Bus
- Frölich Bus
- Grau Busreisen
- Hans Happel Omnibus-Betrieb
- Heinrich Sandrock GmbH & Co. Omnibusbetrieb KG
- Henze-Reisen
- Hessische Landesbahn
- Kahlhöfer-Reisen
- Karin Spies Haunetal-Reisen
- Kasseler Verkehrs-Gesellschaft AG
- Konrad Briel Omnibusreisen
- DB RegioNetz Verkehrs GmbH – Kurhessenbahn
- Omnibusbetrieb Sallwey
- OVG – Oberhessische Verkehrsgesellschaft
- Pfeil-Reisen
- Regionalverkehr Kurhessen GmbH
- Reisedienst Bonte GmbH
- Wilhelm Grebe Reisedienst
- RegioBus Uhlendorff
- Regionalbahn Kassel GmbH
- RegioTram Betriebsgesellschaft mbH
- Reinhold Leuchter Linien- und Verkehrsbetrieb
- Stadtwerke Witzenhausen GmbH
- Taxi Schmidt
- Trümner-Reisen
- ÜWAG Bus GmbH
- Verkehrsgesellschaft Mittelhessen mbH
