= Everling =

Everling is a surname. Notable people with the surname include:

- Gerald Everling (born c. 1943), American football player and coach and collegiate wrestler and coach
- Norbert Müller-Everling (born 1953), German artist
- Ulrich Everling (1925–2018), German jurist
