= German Academy of the Performing Arts =

The German Academy of the Performing Arts (German: Deutsche Akademie der Darstellenden Künste) is an academy founded in Hamburg in 1956 as a nonprofit organization, representing members from theatre, film, television and radio. Their activities and events are supported by foundations, the public sector, broadcasters and sponsors. The location moved to Frankfurt in 1962, and to Bensheim in 2004. The academy awards include the Gertrud-Eysoldt-Ring, the Förderpreis für Regie, and the Radioplay of the Month.

It is also the co-organizer of the German Theratre Award, "Der Faust".

== History ==
Erwin Piscator was the first president of the academy, which was conceived as workshop and for education, but the teaching aspect was not realised. It was first based in Hamburg. In 1962 it moved to Frankfurt am Main. Weeks of experimental theatre called Experimenta were organised in 1966, 1967, 1969, 1971 and 1975. In 1990, a sixth event presented works by Heiner Müller at the Theater am Turm in Frankfurt, followed in 2001 by a seventh Experimenta.

When Frankfurt withdrew its financial support, the academy moved to Bensheim, where the prizes Gertrud-Eysoldt-Ring and the had already been awarded.

== Radioplay of the Month ==
The Radioplay of the Month was established in 1977 togethr with thye ARD association. Since 1987, the Radio Play of the Year has been chosen from the twelve Radio Plays of the Month.
