= Gertrud-Eysoldt-Ring =

German theatre award

The Ringelband Foundation has been awarding the Gertrud-Eysoldt-Ring with the city of Bensheim and the German Academy of the Performing Arts since 1986. The award is endowed with €10,000. The jury changes annually. The prize is awarded for an outstanding performance in the theatre. The theatre critic Wilhelm Ringelband, who died in Bensheim in 1981, donated the prize. Ringelband wanted the name of the Max Reinhardt actress Gertrud Eysoldt (1870–1955) he admired to be associated with an award. The Gertrud-Eysoldt-Ring is one of the most important theatre awards in German-speaking countries.

== Recipients ==
- 1986: Doris Schade
- 1987: Gert Voss
- 1988: Edith Clever
- 1989: Hans Christian Rudolph
- 1990: Cornelia Froboess
- 1991: Ulrich Mühe
- 1992: Rolf Boysen
- 1993: Jürgen Holtz
- 1994: Christa Berndl
- 1995: Martin Wuttke
- 1996: Corinna Harfouch
- 1997: Josef Bierbichler
- 1998: Jutta Lampe
- 1999: Hans-Michael Rehberg
- 2000: Angela Winkler
- 2001: Judith Engel
- 2002: Michael Maertens
- 2003: Dörte Lyssewski
- 2004: Ulrich Matthes
- 2005: Tobias Moretti
- 2006: Nina Hoss
- 2007: Ernst Stötzner
- 2008: Klaus Maria Brandauer
- 2009: Barbara Nüsse
- 2010: Kirsten Dene, Alexander Khuon
- 2011: Nicholas Ofczarek
- 2012: Constanze Becker
- 2013: Steven Scharf
- 2014: Samuel Finzi and Wolfram Koch
- 2015: Charly Hübner
- 2016: Jana Schulz
- 2017: Sophie Rois
- 2018: André Jung
- 2019: Sandra Hüller
- 2021: Lina Beckmann
- 2022: Alicia Aumüller, Patrycia Ziółkowska
- 2023: Jörg Pohl
- 2024: Birgit Minichmayr
- 2025: Thomas Schmauser
