= Kirchberg (Bensheim) =

Coordinates: 49°41′16″N 8°37′36″E

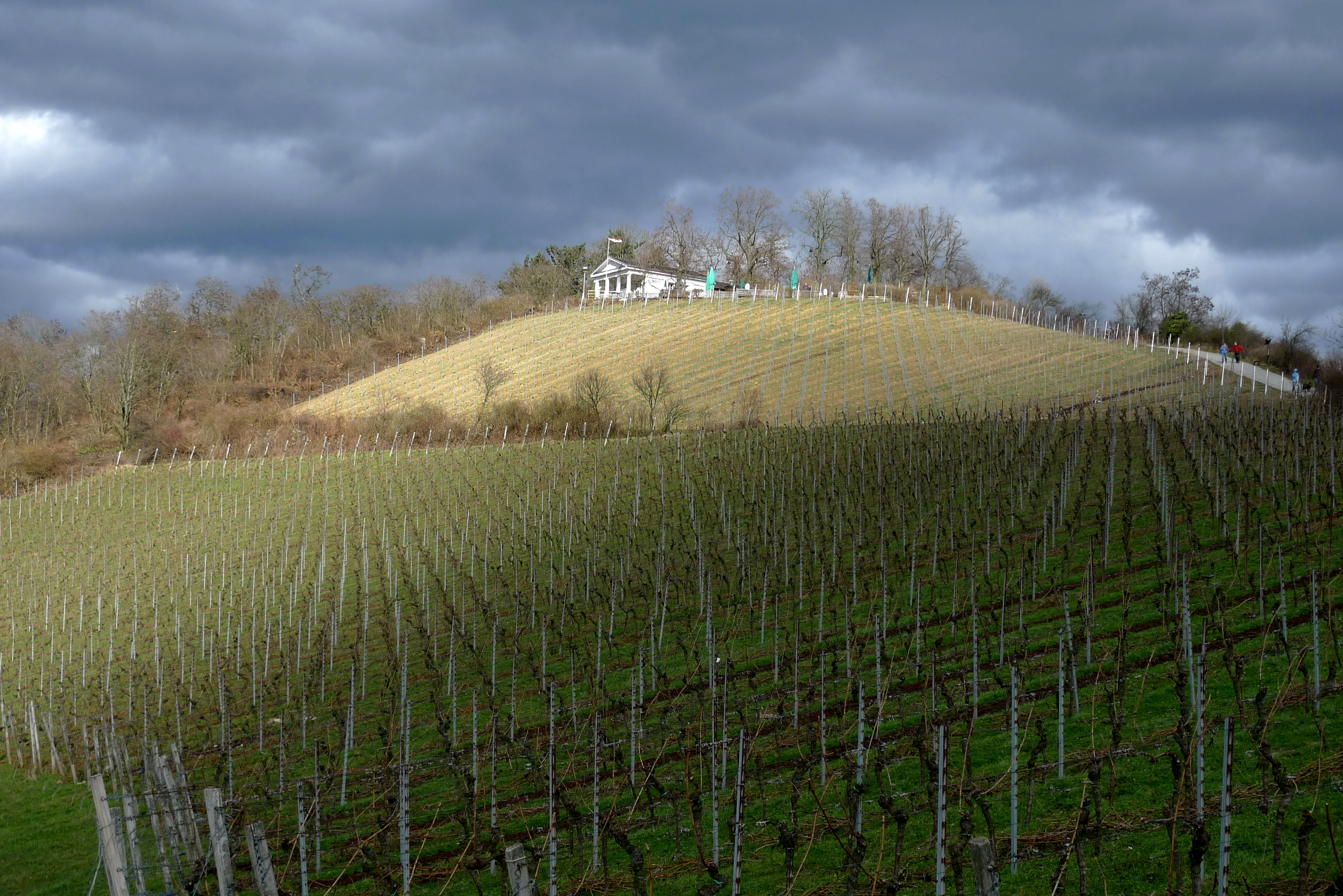
- View of Kirchberg

Highest point
- Elevation: 220.6 m (724 ft)

Geography
- Location: Hesse, Germany

Kirchberg (German pronunciation: [ˈkɪʁçbɛʁk]) is a hill located near Bensheim in Hesse, Germany. It stands at an elevation of approximately 220.6 meters.

The hill is renowned for its vineyards, particularly those producing Riesling wines, contributing to the region's reputation in viticulture.

== Site of massacre ==
On 24 March 1945 - three days before American troops reached nearby Bensheim - twelve German and foreign prisoners, men and women, were murdered by the Gestapo north of the Kirchberg summit. Among the murdered were three American paratroopers (W.H. Forman, R.T. McDonald, Ray F. Hermann). A memorial stone commemorates the act. The murdered were Rosa Bertram, Erich Salomon and Walter Hangen from Worms, Lina Bechstein from Kriegsheim, Gretel Maraldo from Offenbach am Main, Jakob Gramlich from Bonsweiher, two Frenchmen Eugene Dumas and Lothaire Delaunay, Dutchman Frederik Roolker, and three other unidentified People. Pole Johann Goral survived the shooting with serious injuries. Besides him survived Russian Alexander Romanov, as well as the four Groß-Rohrheimer citizens Heinrich Ahl, August Lautenbach, Henry Menger and Georg Ackermann. The memorial stone, which is located at the place of execution, can be reached - coming from the Brunnenweg - on a narrow steep path up to the Kirchberg.
