= Wilhelm Ringelband =

Wilhelm Ringelband (1921–1981) was a German theater critic and endower of the Gertrud-Eysoldt-Ring. The actress Gertrud Eysoldt was a close friend and adviser to him. When Ringelband died, he left extensive archives of German film- and theatre history including a collection of pictures. The archive is located in Bensheim where Ringelband lived until his death.
