= Elsa Fraenkel =

German–born British sculptor (1892–1975)

- Born: Else Rothschild; 25 August 1892; Bensheim, Germany
- Died: 13 June 1975 (aged 82); Bangalore, India
- Known for: Sculpture, Drawing

Elsa Fraenkel née Rothschild (1892–1975) was a German–born British sculptor raised in Heidelberg, Germany.

== Education and Marriage ==
Elsa Fraenkel's interest in art began when she was a young girl. She received the support of her family in this endeavor and took drawing lessons in Brussels at age 16. She also attended History of Art lectures in Heidelberg University and studied at Karlsruhe Academy under Friedrich Fehr (drawing) and Herman Foehri (sculpture). In 1918, the year of her marriage to Dr.jur. Georg Fraenkel, she moved to Hanover, where her husband had his practice. They had two children. She lived in Hannover till 1933. While in Hannover, Germany Elsa Fraenkel travelled to Paris at least once a year to study further under Jacques Loutchansky, the sculptor, and moved in the artist circles of Constantin Brâncuși, Piet Mondrian, Charles Despiau, Aristide Maillol, Fernand Léger and others.

== Career ==
Elsa Fraenkel began to sculpt mainly bronze life size busts of people and family members she would come across in her daily life and who struck her as being special in some way. Examples include a young American girl (1926), a musician (1927), a young Chinese (1928), an Arabian dancing girl (1929), a gypsy boxer (1930), and a mathematician lecturing with his eyes open she thought was striking. None of these works were commissioned. She exhibited her works in Hanover, Berlin, Brunswick and Mannheim. Her sculpture of a young girl was purchased in 1927 by the Landesmuseum, Hanover.

Elsa Fraenkel moved to Paris in 1933 and lived there till 1935. She was influenced by the portraits of Despiau and by the Chaldean art in the Louvre. In Paris, she worked with bronze, pewter and silver. Among her works are professors she interacted with at the Sorbonne. As a result of the severe political climate in Germany against the Jews, in 1935 Elsa Fraenkel moved to St. John's Wood in London and then to Loughton, Essex, where she lived in a flat at the now demolished Elm Lodge, Church Lane. She was a member and officer of the Essex Art Club, and exhibited at its shows. Fortunately she carried at least one copy of many of her works with her from Germany to Paris and eventually to England as today there is very little evidence of Elsa Fraenkel's works in German catalogues except for the foundry where her work were cast. Her sculpture of a young girl as well as the portrait of the young Chinese were located in the Sprengel Museum, Hanover in 2008.

Until the end of World War II, Fraenkel was less prolific but she continued to sculpt a few individuals she would meet. After the war however, many of Elsa's works from Germany and Paris went on show in several London galleries and museums including the Leicester Galleries, Ben Uri Gallery, Leighton House museum, Stafford Gallery, the Tate Gallery, and the Royal Academy. Her works have also been on show at the Tel Aviv Museum, the Jewish Museum in New York and the Royal Library in Copenhagen. In the 1950s Fraenkel was a contemporary of Dora Gordine (also a sculptor) and became a friend of Sylvia Pankhurst. They worked on some joint projects together. Elsa also began to receive commissions to sculpt bronze and silver busts of well known people.

== Legacy ==
Today, her works are in private collections but are mostly with family members. The following is a list of selected work with their known locations.

- Young Frenchman - permanent collection of the Tate Britain in London
- Rabbi and Jewish Writer - Ben Uri Gallery and Museum, London
- St Michael with Angels - statuette at Church of St Michael and All Angels, Dumfries Scotland
- Princess Tsahai - Royal Palace in Addis Ababa, Ethiopia
- Sri Aurobindo - Aurobindo Ashram, Pondicherry, India
- Queen Sirikit - Palace of Bangkok, Thailand
- The Dalai Lama - Dalai Lama abode, Dharamsala, India
- Prof. Lazarus Goldschmidt’s portrait - Royal Library, Copenhagen, Denmark and the Jewish Museum, New York.

Her work was also presented by Rachel Dickson, Head of Curatorial Services, Ben Uri Gallery and Museum, London (Art, Identity and Migration) in the paper, “I hear only what my eyes tell me”: Elsa Fraenkel (1892-1975) and Erna Nonnenmacher (1889-1980) – Two Jewish Women Sculptors in Exile at the PMSA - Public Monuments and Sculpture Association and 3rd Dimension Annual Conference 2016, Émigré Sculptors in Britain (1500-2016). The paper studied the difficulties these German women faced as they forged new careers in Britain. Elsa Fraenkel had been part of Kurt Schwitters’ circle in Hanover early in her career, and Erna Nonnenmacher graduated in ceramics from Berlin's prestigious Reimann Schule. Nonnenmacher was initially interned on the Isle of Man, when she arrived in Britain, and Dickson revealed how the two faced complex issues as exiled women artists and, as they sought to re-establish their professional careers, both exhibited with the Ben Uri Art Society.

== Memberships ==
- Fellow of the Royal Society of Arts
- Vice President of the Essex Art Club
- Honorary Member of Council of The Royal Society for India, Pakistan and Ceylon

== Major exhibitions ==
- Young American Girl – Artificial stone –(1923) - Sprengel Museum Hannover, Germany
- Minna Tobler, Mask of a Musician- Bronze- (1927) - Leicester Galleries, London; Ben Uri Gallery, London; Women's International Art Collection London
- Ching Sou Cho, Young Chinese architecture student - Bronze- (1928) - Leighton House Museum, London
- Kadra, Arabian Dancing Girl- Bronze- (1929) - Leicester Galleries, London; Gallery of Herr von Garvens, Hannover
- Frank, Son of the Artist (1929) – Bronze, Stucco- Stafford Gallery, London
- Trollman, Gypsy Boxer - Bronze- (1930) - Leicester Galleries, London;
- Dr. Conrades, Art Historian - Bronze- (1931) - Tel Aviv Museum
- Madelaine, granddaughter of French poet Stَephane Mellarmَe– Pewter -(1931)- Leicester Galleries, London
- Professor Dr. Conrad Mueller, Mathematician - Bronze- (1932) – Paris Salon; Palais des Beaux Arts, Brussels; Royal Academy, London; Leicester Galleries, London, Guild Hall, London
- Arnold Hirsch, Lecturer at the Sorbonne – Silver-bronze- (1934) – Vienna
- Young Frenchman - Bronze- (1934/35) - Tate Gallery, London.
- Sidney Sabin - Bronze- (1939) - Stafford Gallery, London.
- Dr Stella Kramrich, Curator of Indian Section Philadelphia Museum of Art – Bronze, Silver- (1940's) - Royal Academy, London
- Very Rev. Haham Dr. M Gaster, Rabbi and Jewish Writer – Bronze-silver- (1946) - Leicester Galleries, London; Ben Uri Gallery, London, Hove Museum, Hove, England
- Professor Dr. Lazarus Goldschmidt, Translator of Talmud and Koran – Bronze-silver- (1946) - Jewish Museum in New York and Royal Library in Copenhagen
- Dr Reginald Le May, Art Historian of Southeast Asian art - Bronze- (1953) - Leicester Galleries, London; Paris Salon
- Sri Aurobindo, Saint and philosopher – Bronze - silver- (1957) –Kings College Library, Cambridge; Royal Exchange, London; Leeds University; Durham University; Essex Art Club
- The Dalai Lama - Bronze-silver- Leicester Galleries, London

== Death ==
Elsa Fraenkel moved to Bangalore, India to live with her daughter in 1969 and died there in 1975.
