= Friedrich von Eichheimer =

Georg Friedrich von Eichheimer (18 August 1764 – 13 October 1854) was a Bavarian military doctor and Generalstabsarzt (Surgeon General) of the Army.

Eichheimer was born in Bensheim. He joined the Bavarian army as a Feldsher on 21 August 1786 and took part in campaigns against France, Austria, Prussia and Russia from 1790 to 1812. Afterwards he was chief of the medical service (Chef des Sanitätswesens) in the army of general Karl Philipp von Wrede in the rank of Oberstarzt. He was advanced to the rank Major General (MC) in 1826, and died in Munich, where he lived at Sonnenstraße 18 around 1850.

== Publications ==
- Umfassende Darstellung des Militair-Medizinal-Wesens in allen seinen Beziehungen mit Rücksicht auf die dermaligen Armeen-Verfassungen im Allgemeinen, zunächst aber als ein vollständiges Reglement für die Königlich-Baierische in Friedens- und Kriegszeiten, Augsburg, 1824
