= Norbert Müller-Everling =

German artist

- Born: 27 March 1953; Bensheim, West Germany
- Known for: Sculptor

Norbert Müller-Everling (born 27 March 1953) is a contemporary German artist working with concrete art.

== Time line ==
Year	
1953	Born in Bensheim (Hesse, Germany), raised in Wattenscheid (North Rhine-Westphalia)
1973–79	Studied at the Academy of Fine Arts, Düsseldorf, with Erwin Heerich
1979–82	Studied philosophy at the RWTH Aachen University
1982–86	Worked at freelanced artist
1987–92	Worked in the center of arts Wachsfabrik in Cologne
1986–90	Cooperated with jazz musician Markus Stockhausen (Performance Lila)
1993–98	Worked at freelanced artist
1996–present	Instructor of arts in Altenkirchen, Rhineland-Palatinate

== Style ==
Norbert Müller-Everling is an artist characterised by his unique philosophy and usage of colour in his work. 1973–79 he was studying at the Kunstakademie Düsseldorf as a student of Erwin Heerich, afterwards philosophy in Aachen. He began developing his own style in the early 1980s. His work of that time is characterised to create forms which follow the tradition of concrete art, as Max Bill and others founded it. He sought to create objects so that the new science of form could be experienced by the senses. A prime example of his sculptural work is his Percent for Art work for the Bundesverteidigungsministerium Bonn, (1997). His later works are characterised by using colour sparingly in objects in material form of coloured paraffin. He developed his own style of having light be the medium of the work itself. It allows his work to be independent of connections to any kind of representation.

== List of special works ==
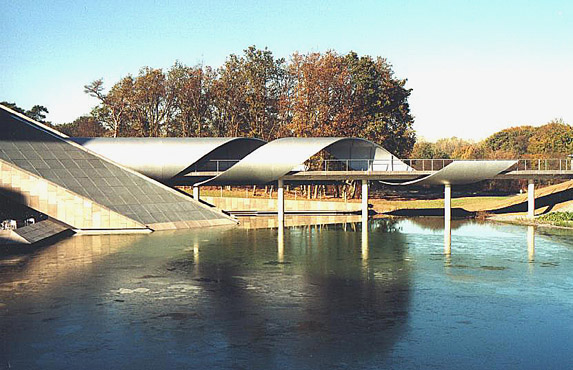
Norbert Müller-Everling, bridge object through the canteen, Bundesverteidigungsministerium Bonn, 1997

- 1989 – Goethe-Institut Lima
- 1992 – Logarithmische Wassertreppe, Sozialgericht Cologne
- 1994 – Clemens-Hastricht-Platz, Cologne-Bickendorf
- 1994 – Suermondt-Ludwig-Museum Aachen
- 1997 – Bundesverteidigungsministerium Bonn

== Solo exhibitions (selected) ==
- 1991: Aine Art Museum Tornio in Finland
- 1994: art multiple Düsseldorf
- 2000: Stadtmuseum Siegburg
- 2007: Die krumme Wahrheit des Raums, Kunstbüroberlin, Berlin, Germany (with Norvin Leineweber, Dirk Radtke and Heiner Thiel)
- 2008: kunst & kommunikation Bochum
- 2018: Art Pütz, Montzen, Belgium
- 2022: Konkretionen des Lichts - Stiftung für Konkrete Kunst Roland Phleps, Freiburg im Breisgau

== Group exhibitions (selected) ==
- 1988 – Pyramiden“, Internationales Kongresszentrum Berlin u. Galerie Jule Kewenig, Frechen
- 1998 – BBK-Köln, Stapelhaus
- 1998 – 1. Biennale für konkrete Kunst, Künstlerforum Bonn
- 1999 – 7 konkrete Künstler im Brunswiker Pavillon, Kiel
- 1999 – „gruppe konkret“ und Gäste, Museum Abtei Liesborn
- 1999 – International Art Festival, Naju, Süd-Korea
- 2000 – Gesellschaft für Kunst und Gestaltung, Bonn (mit Norvin Leineweber)
- 2001 – 3. Biennale für konkrete Kunst, Andernach
- 2001 – „Logik und Poesie in der konkreten Kunst“, Haus Dacheröden, Erfurt
- 2001 – 4 Konkrete aus Rheinland-Pfalz, Landtag, Mainz
- 2002 – „Transparent – Transluzid“, Galerie Renate Bender, München
- 2002 – „Übersicht“ - Westdeutscher Künstlerbund, Museum Bochum
- 2002 – „Europa Konkret Reduktiv“, Museum Modern Art, Hünfeld
- 2003 – 30 Positionen - 30 Räume, Museum Modern Art, Hünfeld
- 2005 – Konkrete Kunst in Rheinland-Pfalz, Haus Metternich, Koblenz
- 2005 – „Lohn der Arbeit“ - Westdeutscher Künstlerbund, Kunstmuseum Gelsenkirchen
- 2007 – Die krumme Wahrheit des Raums, Kunstbüroberlin, Berlin, Deutschland (mit Norvin Leineweber, Dirk Radtke und Heiner Thiel)
- 2010 – „Landpartie“, Westdeutscher Künstlerbund, Museum Abtei Liesborn
- 2017 – 25 Jahre „Kunst und Kommunikation“, Bochum
- 2020 – Haus Metternich, Koblenz
- 2024 – Schau Fenster Schau #9, Galerie r8m, Köln (with Peter Dorn, Thomas Kemper, Ivo Ringe)

== Bibliography ==
- Die krumme Wahrheit des Raumes – Ausstellungskatalog Kunstbüroberlin, Bremen, Hachmannedition, 2007
- Europa Konkret Reduktiv – Ausstellungskatalog Museum Modern Art Hünfeld, 2002, Hrsg. Jürgen Blum
- Übersicht – Westdeutscher Künstlerbund – Katalog zur Ausstellung im Museum Bochum, 2002
- Logik + Poesie – Dokumentation zu einem Kolloquium im Forum Konkrete Kunst Erfurt, 2001
- Im Studium bei Erwin Heerich 1961–1987 – Buchhandlung Walther König, Köln, 2000
- Norbert Müller- Everling, Diaphainon – Ausstellungskatalog, Hrsg. Gert Fischer, darin: Pohlmann, Andreas: Diaphainon – Zu den Wandarbeiten aus Wachs von Norbert Müller-Everling – Katalog Stadtmuseum Siegburg 2000
- Kunst und Bau NRW – Ministerium f. Bauen und Wohnen, Düsseldorf, 1998
- Johannes Peter Hölzinger: “Synthese des Arts” – Die Verbindung von Kunst u. Architektur bei den Regierungsbauten auf der Hardthöhe in Bonn. Edition Axel Menges, Stuttgart/London, 1998, ISBN 3-932565-09-6
- Ingeborg Flagge (Hrsg.): Eine Architektur für die Sinne: Busmann & Haberer. Verlag Ernst & Sohn, 1996, ISBN 3-433-02658-0
- Norbert Müller- Everling: Ausstellungskatalog, Galerie am Tiergarten, Hannover, 1993
