= Gerald Everling =

American football player and wrestler, coach

Biographical details
- Born: c. 1943

Playing career

Football
- 1961–1964: Syracuse
- 1965: Mohawk Valley Falcons

Wrestling
- 1963–1965: Syracuse
- Position: Offensive guard

Coaching career (HC unless noted)

Football
- 1965–1966: Rush–Henrietta HS (NY) (assistant)
- 1967–1968: Elmira Notre Dame HS (NY)
- 1969–1970: Union (NY) (DC)
- 1971–1974: Union (NY)
- 1975–1999: Rush–Henrietta HS (NY)
- 2000–2001: Rush–Henrietta HS (NY) (assistant)

Wrestling
- 1969–1974: Union (NY)

Head coaching record
- Overall: 11–23 (college football)

Gerald A. Everling (born c. 1943) is an American former football player and coach and collegiate wrestler and coach. He served as the head football coach at Union College in Schenectady, New York from 1971 to 1974, compiling a record of 11–23. Everling played college football at Syracuse University and spent one season with the Mohawk Valley Falcons of the Atlantic Coast Football League (ACFL).

== Head coaching record ==
=== College football ===
| Year | Team | Overall | Conference | Standing | Bowl/playoffs |
|---|---|---|---|---|---|
Union Dutchmen (New England Small College Athletic Conference) (1971–1974)
| 1971 | Union | 3–6 | | | |
| 1972 | Union | 4–5 | | | |
| 1973 | Union | 2–6 | | | |
| 1974 | Union | 2–6 | | | |
| Union: | | 11–23 | | | |
| Total: | | 11–23 | | | |
