= Bensheim =

- Town
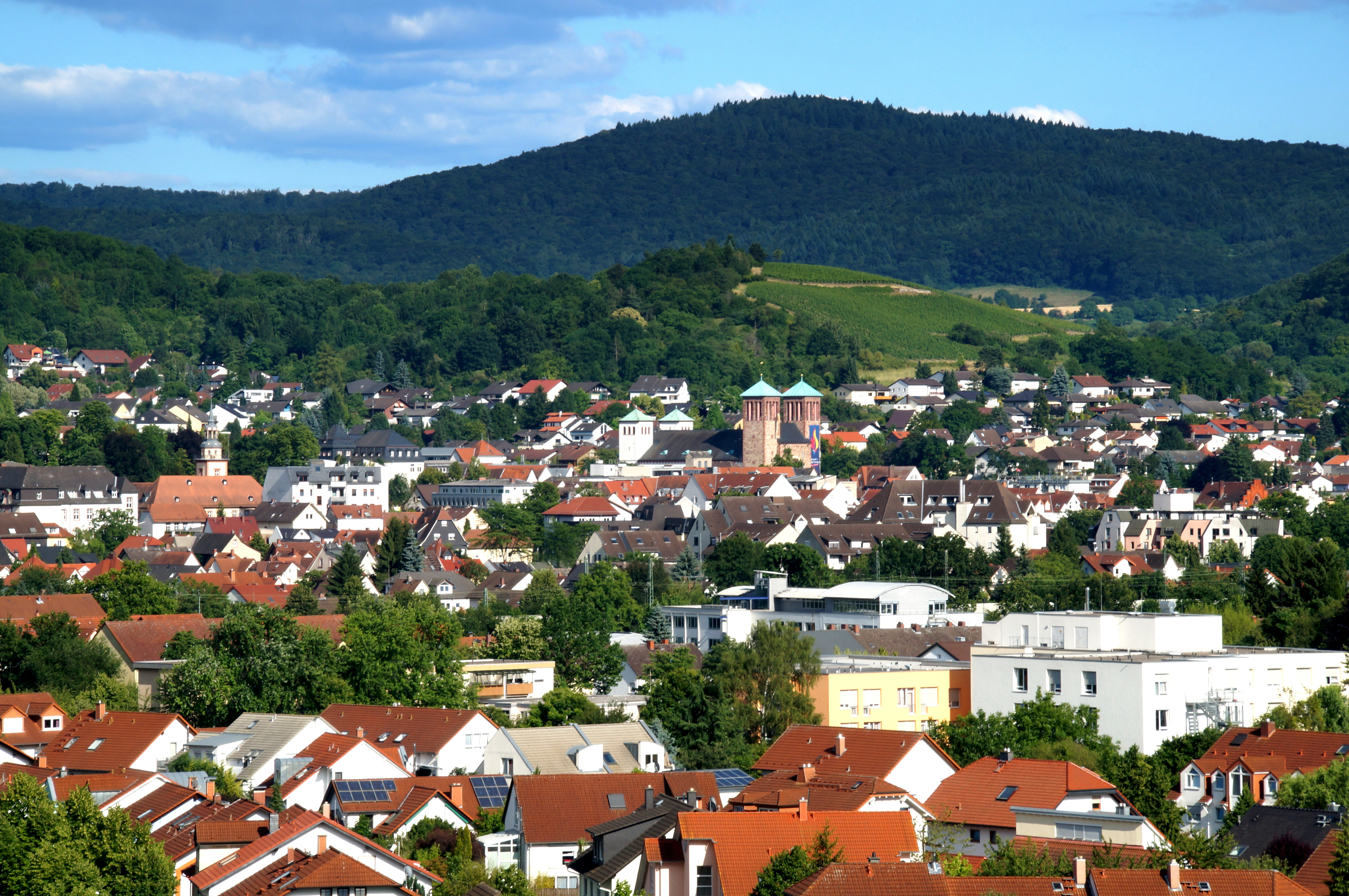
- Inner city of Bensheim

- Coat of arms

- Location of Bensheim within Bergstraße district
- Interactive map of Bensheim
- Location within Germany Location within Hesse
- Coordinates: 49°40′N 8°37′E
- Country: Germany
- State: Hesse
- Admin. region: Darmstadt
- District: Bergstraße

Government
  - Mayor (2020–26): Christine Klein (SPD)

Area
  - Total: 57.83 km^{2} (22.33 sq mi)
- Elevation: 115 m (377 ft)

Population (2025-12-31)
  - Total: 40,848
  - Density: 706.3/km^{2} (1,829/sq mi)
- Time zone: UTC+01:00 (CET)
  - Summer (DST): UTC+02:00 (CEST)
- Postal codes: 64625
- Dialling codes: 06251
- Vehicle registration: HP
- Website: https://www.bensheim.de/

Bensheim (German pronunciation: [ˈbɛnsˌhaɪm]) is a town in the Bergstraße district in southern Hessen, Germany. Bensheim lies on the Bergstraße and at the edge of the Odenwald mountains while at the same time having an open view over the Rhine plain. With about 40,000 inhabitants (2016), it is the district's biggest town.

== Geography ==
=== Location ===
The town lies at the eastern edge of the Rhine rift on the slopes of the western Odenwald on the Bergstraße. The nearest major cities are Darmstadt (some 22 km (14 mi) to the north), Heidelberg (some 35 km (22 mi) to the south), Worms (some 18 km (11 mi) to the west) and Mannheim (some 32 km (20 mi) to the southwest). The district seat of Heppenheim lies roughly 5 km (3 mi) to the south.

The Lauter flows through Bensheim, coming from the Lauter valley from the east, which after it passes through Bensheim is known as the Winkelbach. In the south of town runs the Meerbach, also coming from the Odenwald (but from the Zell valley). Mostly channelled underground and only coming above ground at the western edge of town is the Neuer Graben, or “New Channel”, which branches off the Lauter.

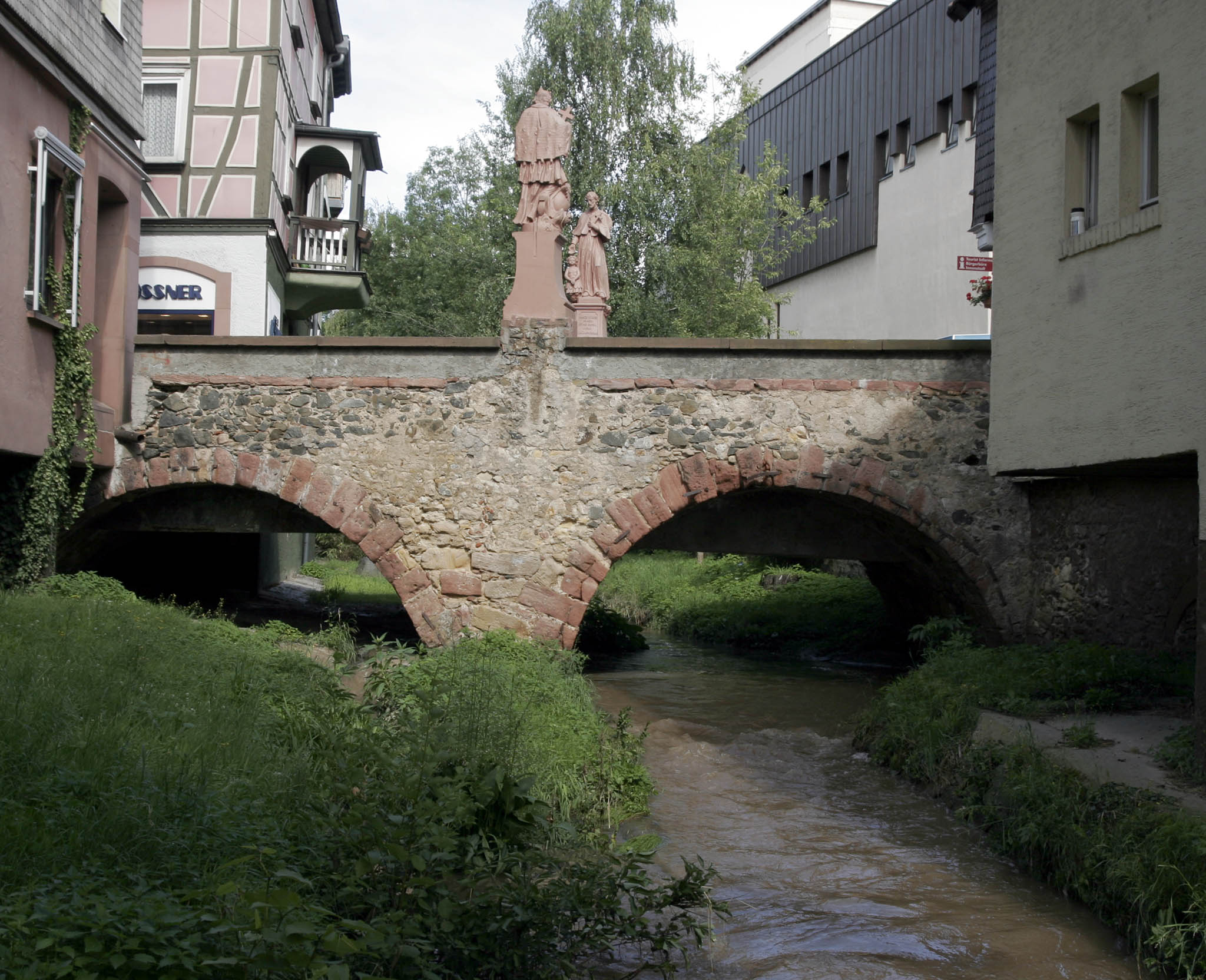
The Winkelbach at the Mittelbrücke

=== Neighbouring communities ===
Bensheim borders in the north on the town of Zwingenberg and the communities of Alsbach-Hähnlein und Seeheim-Jugenheim (both in Darmstadt-Dieburg), in the east on the community of Lautertal, in the south on the town of Heppenheim and in the west on the town of Lorsch and the community of Einhausen.

=== Constituent communities ===
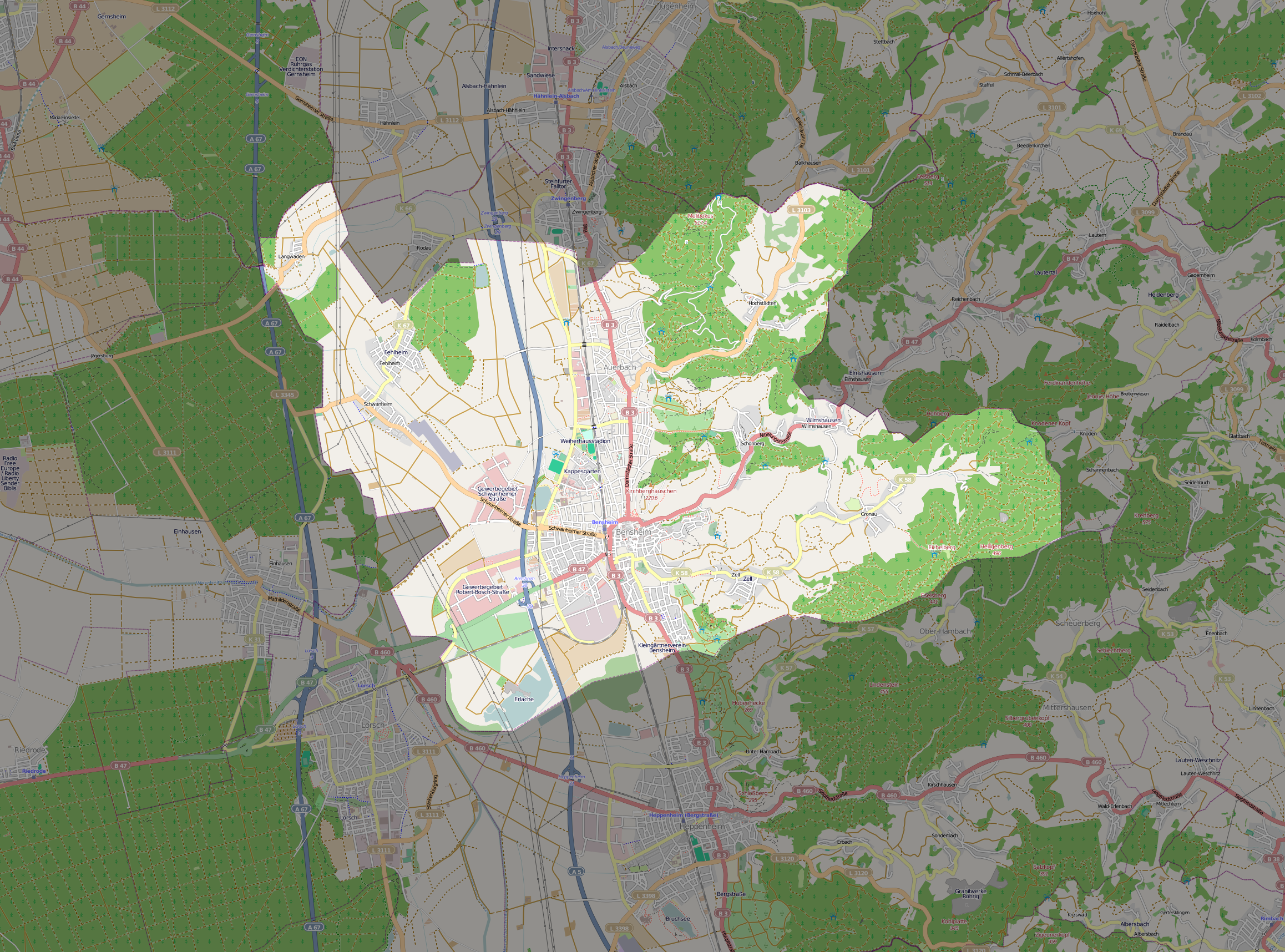
City limits of Bensheim

Bensheim is roughly subdivided thus:

- The main town east of the railway line (old town and outskirts) with many modern town expansion developments (for example the neighbourhoods of Brunnenweg, Metzendorf, Griesel, Meerbach and Hemsberg);
- The Weststadt ("West Town") west of the railway line (for example the neighbourhoods of Port Arthur, Marokko, Leibweh and Kappesgärten);
- The outlying centre of Auerbach to the north of the main town on the Bergstraße;
- The outlying centres of Hochstädten, Schönberg, Wilmshausen, Gronau and Zell in the nearer Odenwald valleys;
- The outlying centres of Langwaden, Fehlheim and Schwanheim in the Hessisches Ried (part of the Rhine rift in Hesse).

=== Climate ===
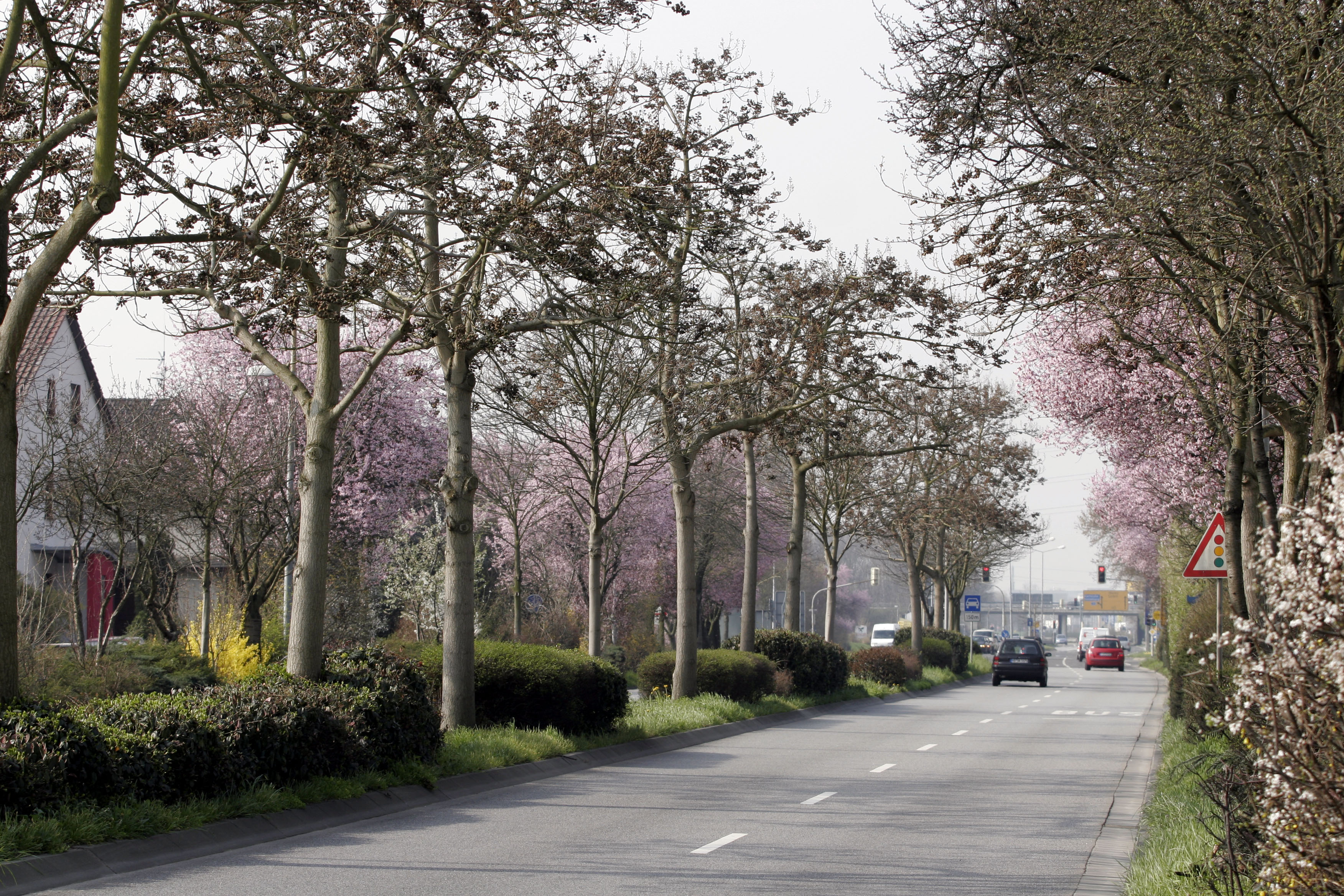
Blossoming almond trees on Wormser Straße on 16 March 2007

Bensheim is especially well known, like other places along the Bergstraße as well, for its particularly mild and sunny climate with roughly 2,000 hours of sunshine yearly and Germany's earliest onset of spring. Under the Odenwald's protection, kiwifruit, almonds, figs and peaches thrive here, giving the Bergstraße the nickname "Germany's Riviera".

The town of Bensheim fosters almond tree cultivation, to name one example, in people's front gardens. Each year in Bensheim, there is even a Blütenkönigin ("Blossom Queen"). She is put forth every year by the Bensheim Automobile Club and for decades has been Bensheim's hallmark both within the country and abroad.

== History ==
Bensheim has grown out of a village that had its first documentary mention in the 8th century. In the 14th century, Bensheim was granted town rights. On 26 March 1945, shortly before American forces entered, much of the Old Town was destroyed by incendiary bombs.

=== Settlement history ===
The South Hesse area was settled quite early on. The many finds from archaeological digs stretch back to the time of the Linear Pottery and Corded Ware cultures (roughly 2500 to 1500 BC), peoples who raised crops and livestock.

=== Middle Ages ===
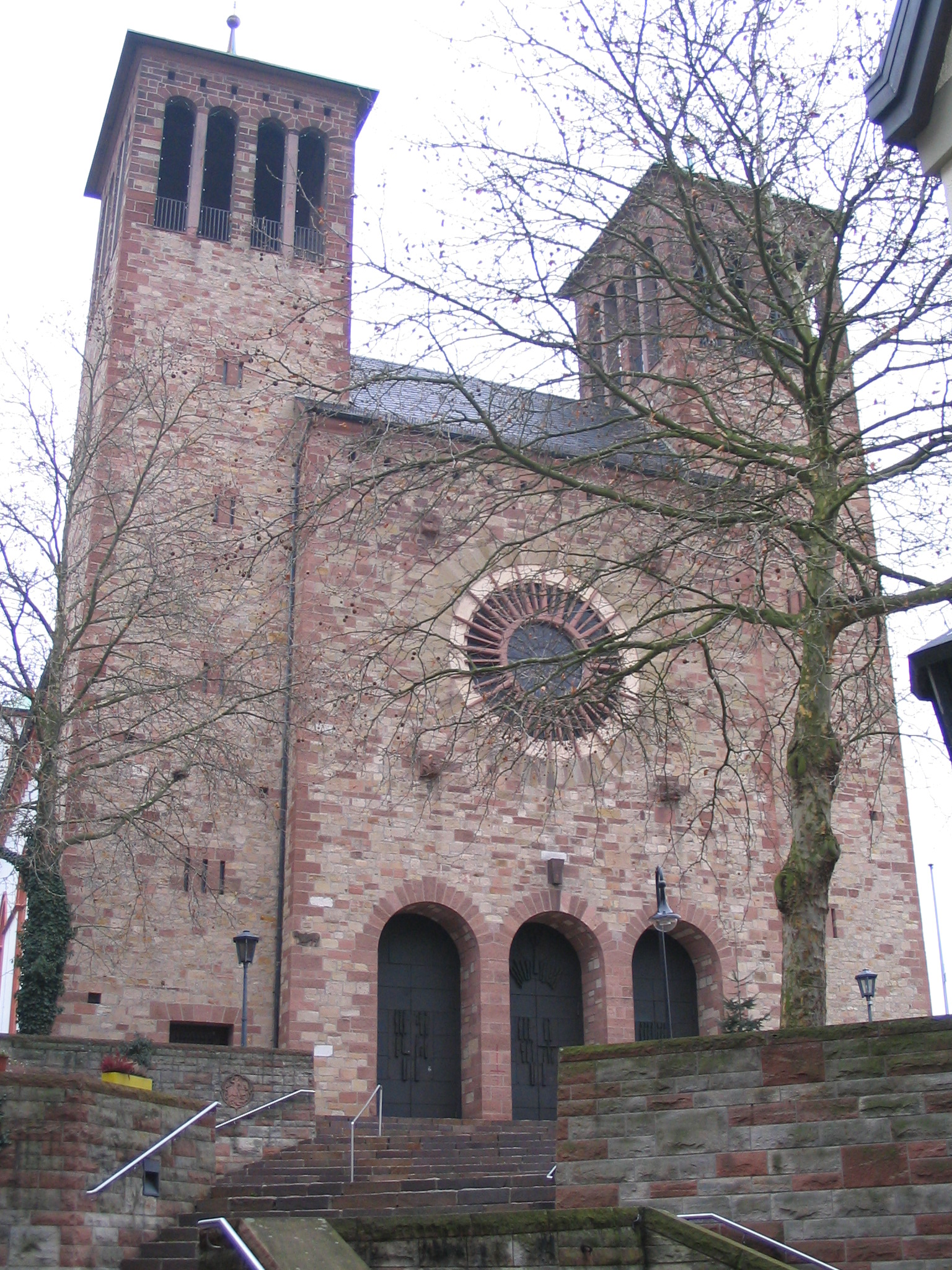
Saint George's church

In 765, Basinsheim had its first documentary mention in the Lorsch Abbey's Codex Laureshamensis. Its founding may go back to a knight named Basinus, who received the rights to found a settlement.

The name changed from Basinsheim to Basinusheim and then to Besensheim, finally becoming Bensheim. Noteworthy is that town rights were granted early on by Emperor Otto I on 5 March 956. It can be inferred from the document text that Otto I, on the occasion of his stay in Frankfurt am Main, with his wife Adelheid's intervention, awarded the Lorsch Abbey's oldest market privilege. The concept, called publicae mercationes in the original, indicates the community, where public buying and selling was allowed. It still cannot be assumed that this led to a regular yearly or weekly market. Great parts of the town were destroyed in the siege of 1301 by King Albrecht I.

When Friedrich II enfeoffed the territory of the now derelict Lorsch Imperial Abbey to Archbishop Siegfried III of Eppstein, Bensheim became part of the Electorate of Mainz's domains and likely received town rights only a few decades later, which is, however, only proved by a certificate issued in 1320.

=== Early modern times ===
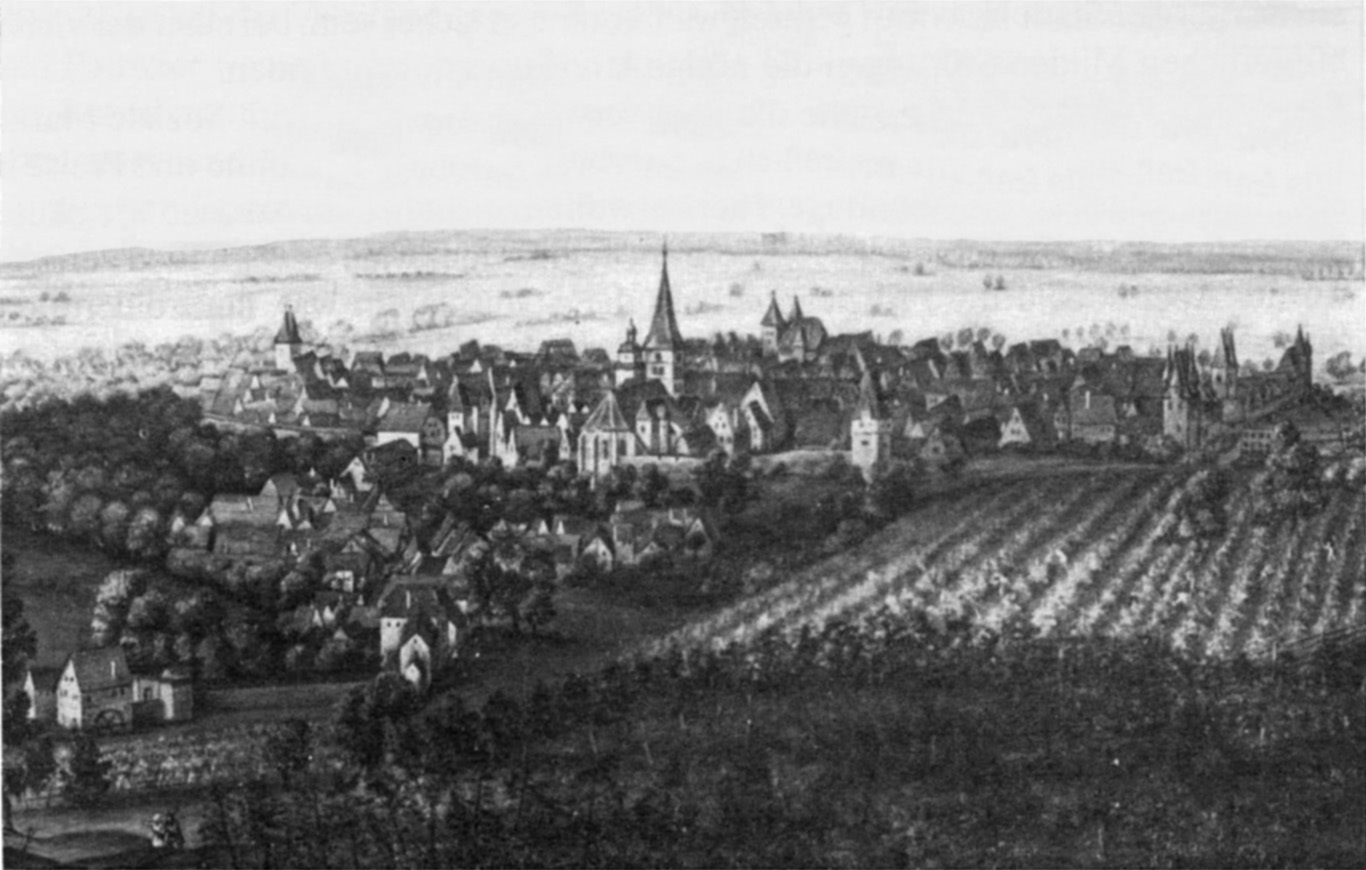
Bensheim about 1612

In today's outlying centres of Auerbach and Schönberg, Bensheim borders on what were the Upper County – "Upper" here refers to geography, not rank – of the Counts of Katzenelnbogen and domains of the Schenken of Erbach. When the Katzenelnbogens died out in 1479, the Landgraviate of Hesse became a neighbour to the north. In 1532, the Erbachs were raised to counts and the County of Erbach became a neighbour to the east.

In the time of the pledging to the counts palatine of the Rhine from 1461 to 1650, Bensheim experienced a boom, but as a Palatinate town, however, it was embroiled in the Bavarian-Palatine war of succession in 1504, and for eleven days was unsuccessfully besieged by the Landgrave of Hesse, who was charged with the execution of the ban of the Empire, and his confederates, the Dukes Henry of Brunswick and Henry of Mecklenburg. From this year, two yearly markets and one weekly can be established; a third yearly market came in 1619.

With the introduction of the Reformation in the Landgraviate of Hesse in 1526 and in the County of Erbach in 1544, Bensheim got not only a territorial border with these neighbours, but also a denominational one.

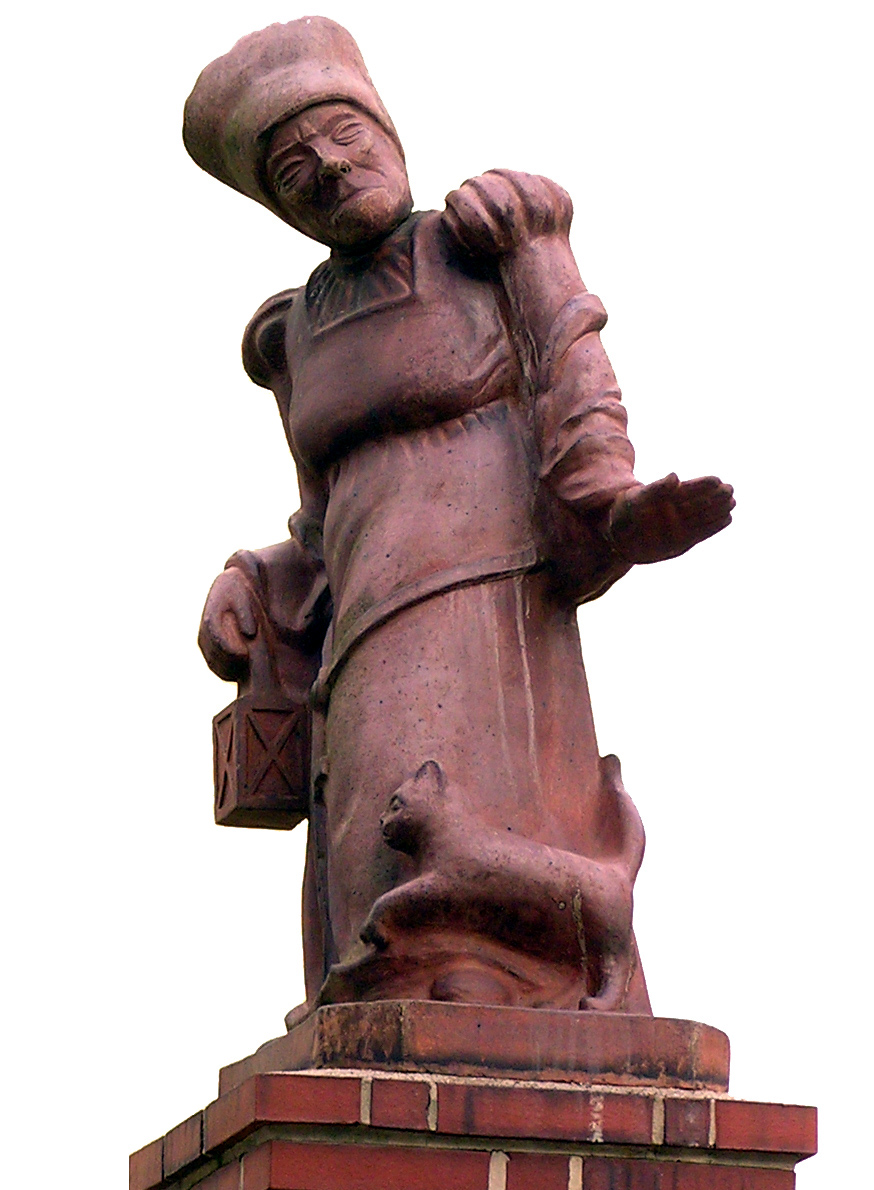
Fountain figure of the Fraa vun Bensem

The Thirty Years' War put an end to all the positive developments mentioned above. On 20 November 1644, Bensheim was occupied by French and Swedish troops, who were driven out again on 2 December by Bavarian units. Later, the legend of the Fraa vun Bensem arose (the "woman from Bensheim" is said to have led the Bavarians into town through a secret route). In 1650, after just under 200 years of being pledged to the Electorate of the Palatinate, Bensheim was once again redeemed by the Archbishopric of Mainz.

=== Modern times ===
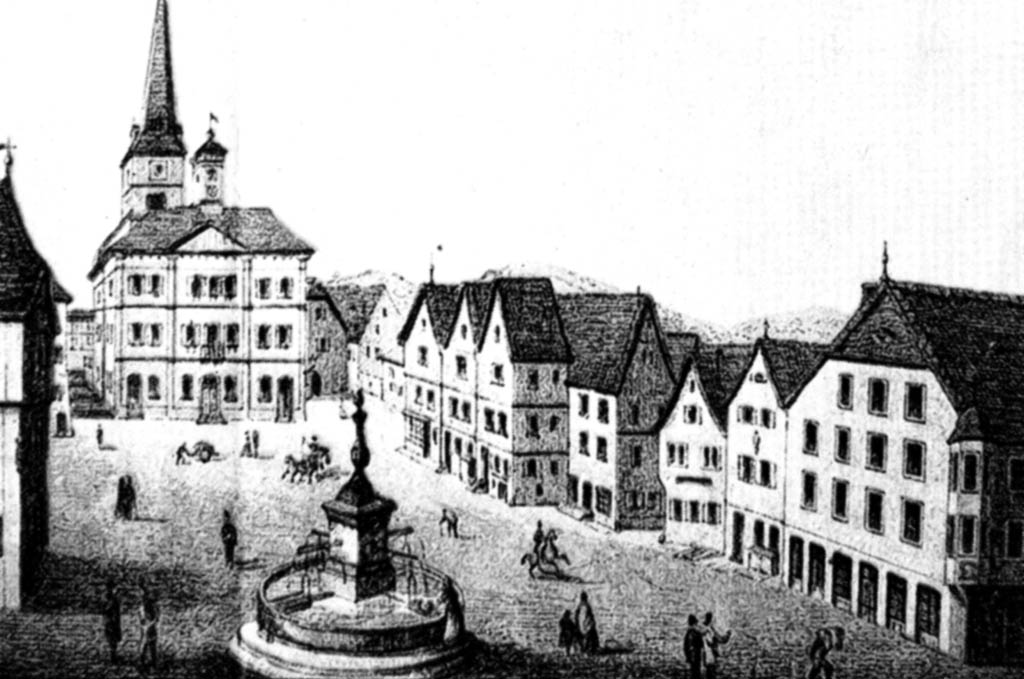
Bensheim's marketplace in 1869 (lithograph by F. Rau)

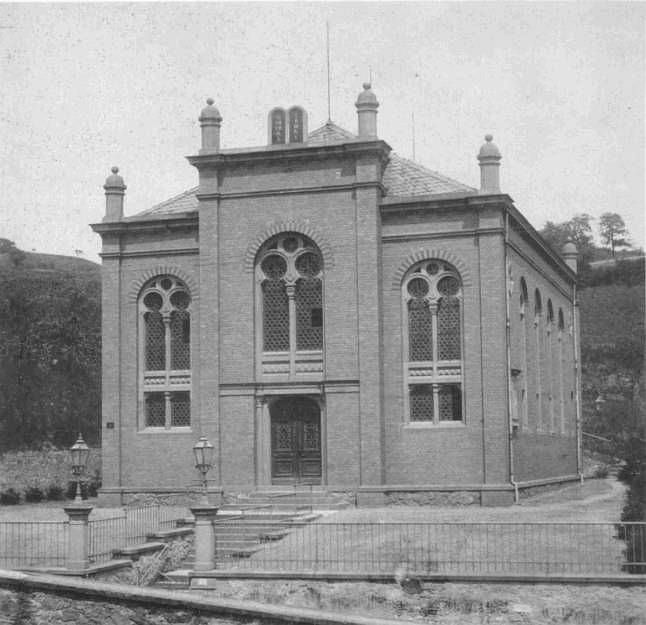
Synagogue of Bensheim in 1900

By the Reichsdeputationshauptschluss in 1803, Bensheim passed to the Landgrave of Hesse-Darmstadt, who joined the Confederation of the Rhine in 1806 and was raised to Grand Duke. In 1822, there was a great fire in which 16 buildings were destroyed and 15 others were heavily damaged.

Bensheim became the seat of the Landratsbezirk (an administrative region) of Bensheim in the province of Starkenburg, which in 1832 was merged with the Landratsbezirk of Heppenheim to form the district of Bensheim (Kreis Bensheim) with Bensheim as its seat.

In 1918, the Grand Duke was removed and out of the Grand Duchy of Hesse the People's State of Hesse was formed. On 1 November 1938, the districts of Bensheim and Heppenheim were merged into one district, Kreis Bergstraße with Heppenheim as its seat. To offset Bensheim's loss of the status of district seat, the town got the district leadership of the Nazi Party.

During Kristallnacht on 9 November 1938, the synagogue was destroyed, while the one in Auerbach survived. In 1939, Auerbach, Schönberg and Zell were amalgamated, raising the population to just under 16,500. In Auerbach, a subcamp of Natzweiler-Struthof Concentration Camp was built.

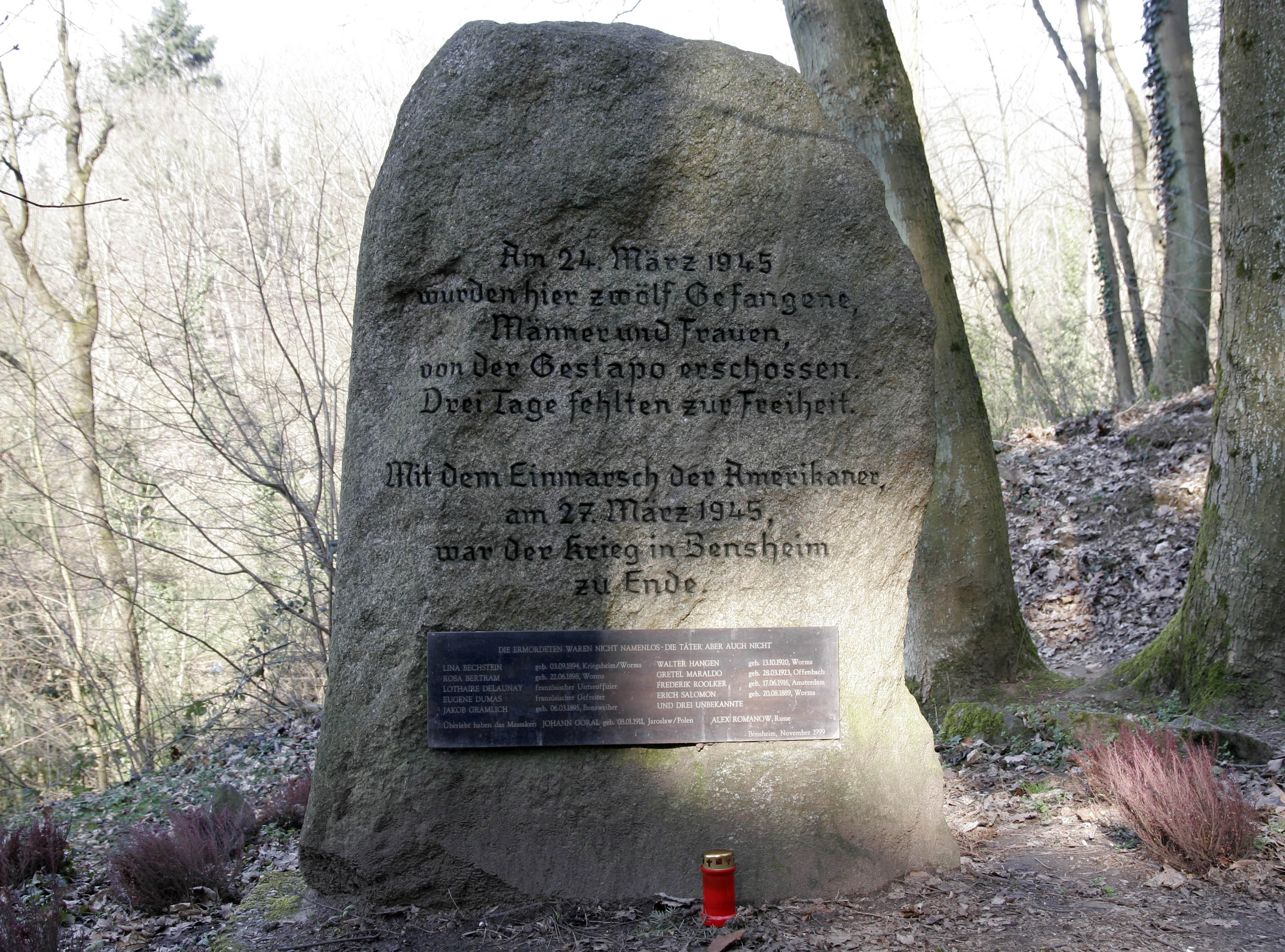
Memorial stone to the massacre of 24 March 1945

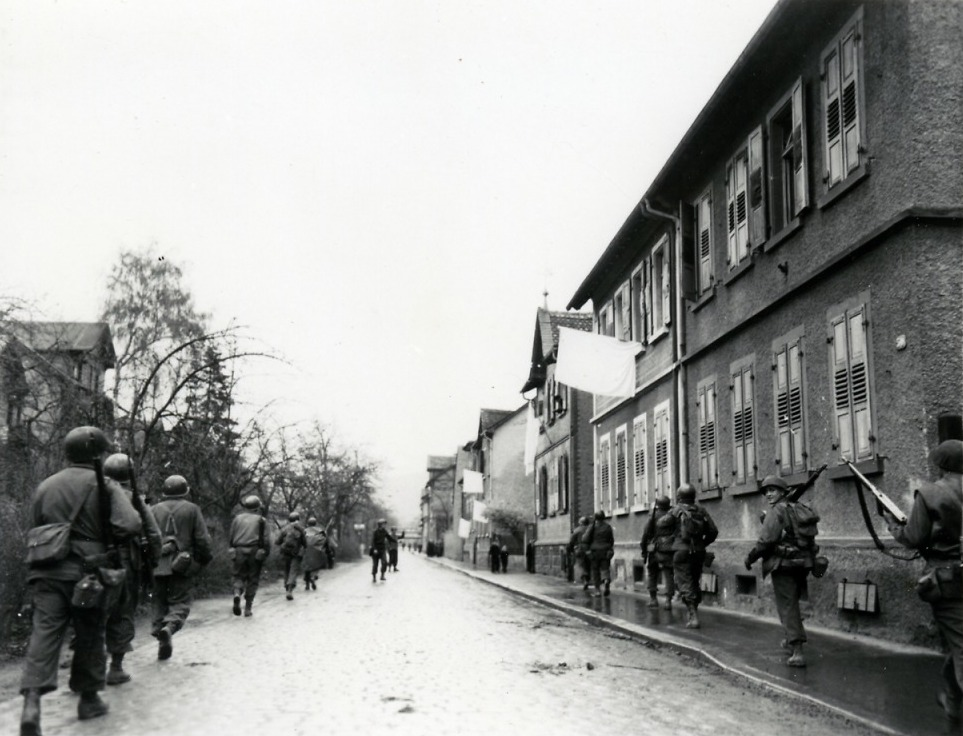
US 180th Infantry Regiment entering Bensheim 27 March 1945

On 24 March 1945, twelve people were taken to the Kirchberg (mountain) where they were murdered by the Gestapo. Two days later, on 26 March 1945, Saint George's Parish Church, the Town Hall and parts of the Old Town were destroyed by incendiary bombs. On 27 March, the town was occupied by United States troops. As the U.S. Army Counter Intelligence Corps agent, Henry Kissinger was the most important representative of the occupying power, after the official town commander.

In 1945, Bensheim passed to the newly formed state of Hesse.

After the Second World War ended in 1945, a displaced persons camp was established in Bensheim, first for Polish former forced labourers, later for Jewish displaced persons. The camp was dissolved in 1949.

In 1971, the population rose to some 34,000 with the amalgamation of Langwaden, Schwanheim, Fehlheim, Hochstädten, Gronau and Wilmshausen.

From 1859 to 1987 on the Nibelungenstraße towards Schönberg stood the Guntrum Bräu Bensheim brewery. In 1979, the brewery was taken over by Binding Bier Mainz, and then closed and torn down in 1987. Today, the former premises are home to a number of houses.

== Politics ==
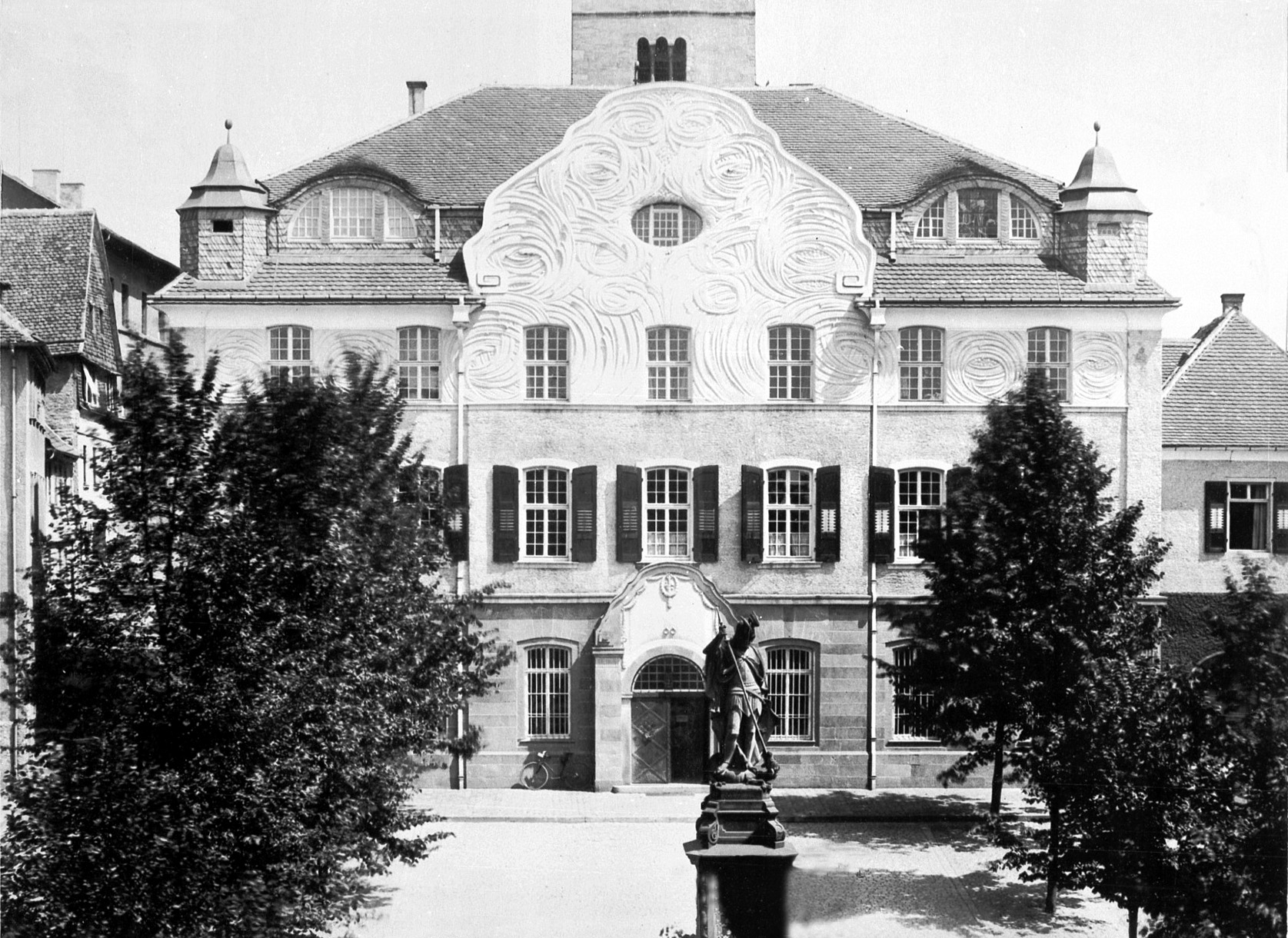
Bensheim's old town hall in 1905, built by Heinrich Metzendorf and destroyed in the Second World War

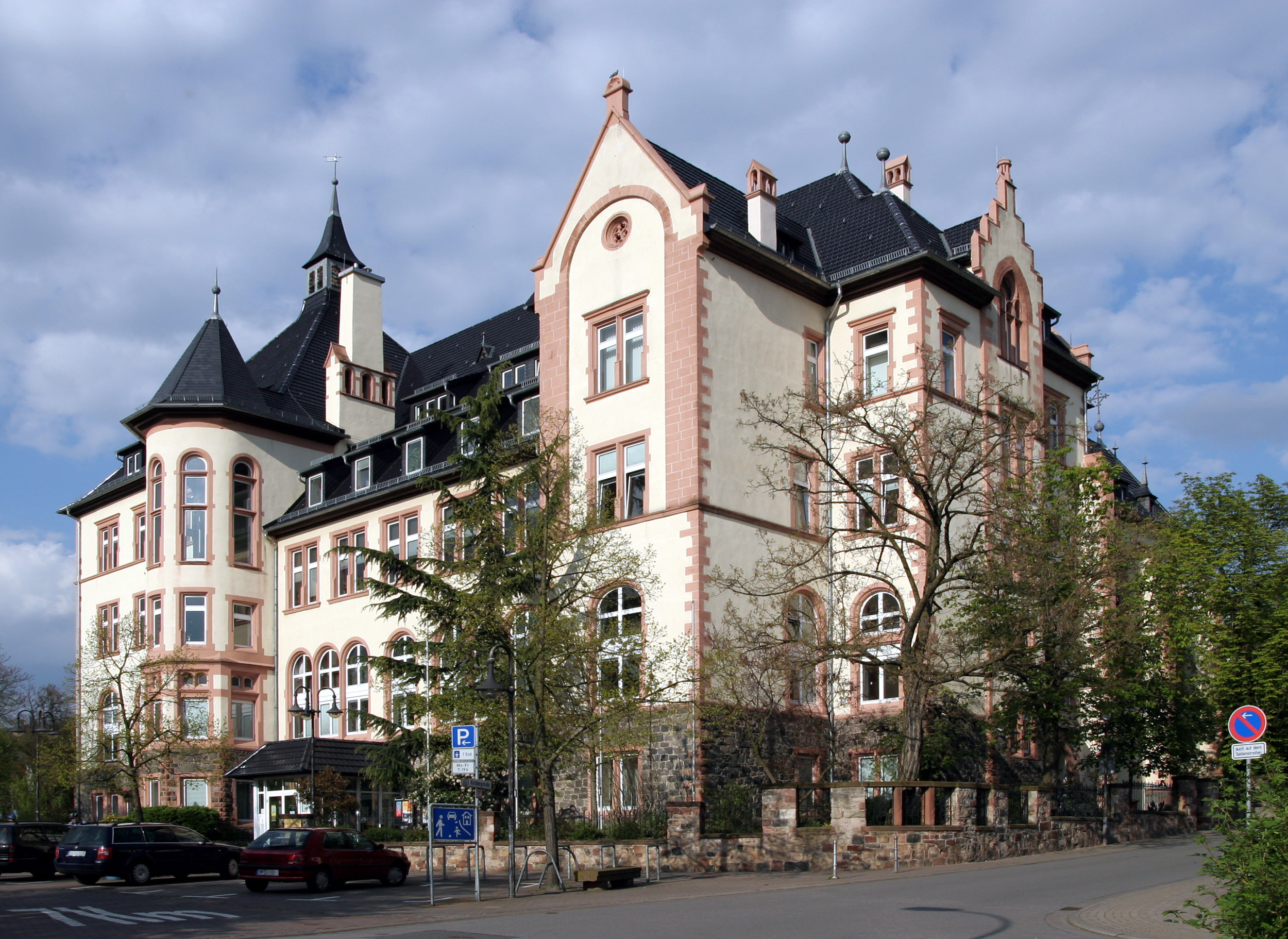
Bensheim town hall (former episcopal theological college)

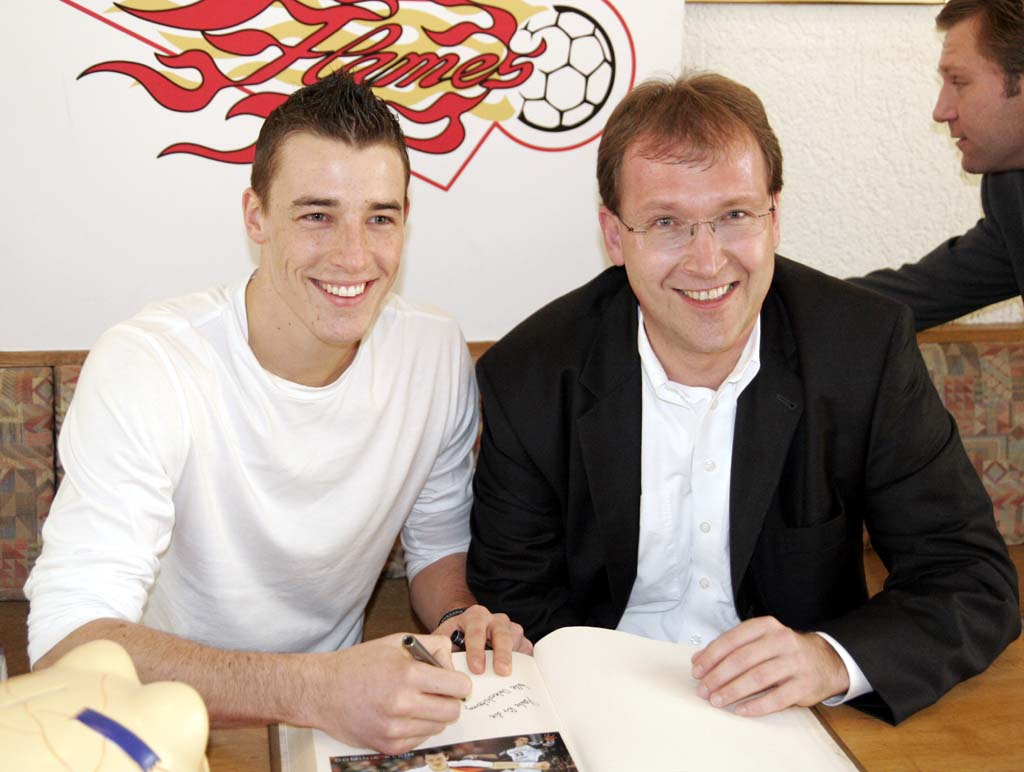
Mayor Thorsten Herrmann (right) with Dominik Klein, entering himself in Bensheim's Golden Book, on 10 March 2007

=== Town council ===
The municipal election held on 24 March 2021 yielded the following results:

Parties and voter communities		% 2021	Seats 2021	% 2016	Seats; 2016	% 2011	Seats; 2011	% 2006	Seats; 2006	% 2001	Seats; 2001
CDU	Christian Democratic Union of Germany	31.87	15	33.3	15	36.4	16	43.2	20	43.1	20
SPD	Social Democratic Party of Germany	16.92	7	17.5	8	23.8	11	29.5	13	32.7	15
FDP	Free Democratic Party	8.98	4	6.9	3	4.0	2	7.1	3	5.3	2
GLB	Grüne Liste Bensheim	---	---	14.1	7	22.9	10	13.6	6	13.7	6
GRÜNE	Bündnis 90/Die Grünen	25.52	11	---	---	---	---	---	---	---	---
FWG	Freie Wählergemeinschaft Bensheim	5.56	3	3.0	1	5.7	3	6.6	3	5.2	2
BFB	Bürger für Bensheim	6.73	3	11.8	5	7.2	3	---	---	---	---
AfD	Alternative für Deutschland	4.42	2	13.3	6	---	---	---	---	---	---
Total		100	45	100	45	100	45	100	45	100	45
Voter turnout in %			48.98		49.1		47.0		43.0	50.5	

The Green List Bensheim (GLB) became a full member of the party Bündnis 90/Die Grünen and ran in the 2021 local elections as Bündnis 90/Die Grünen (Greens). The Magistrat (roughly "town executive") is made up of nine councillors and the mayor Christine Klein. The full-time councillor is Nicole Rauber-Jung. The other seats are shared among the CDU (3), the SPD (1), Bündnis 90 Die Grünen (2) FDP (1) and the FWG (1).

=== Mayors ===
When the Municipal Order of the Grand Duchy of Hesse came into force on 30 June 1821, Bensheim citizens were allowed to choose their mayor.

- 1822–1825: Philipp Meißel
- 1825–1837: Philipp Werle
- 1837–1840: Adam Fertig
- 1840–1857: Johannes Traupel
- 1857–1859: Joseph August Hainz
- 1860–1870: Franz Heinz
- 1871–1902: Aloys van Gries
- 1902–1912: Ignaz Frenay
- 1913–1922: Karl Löslein
- 1922–1933: Rudolf Angermeier
- 1933–1934: Heinrich Nachtigall
- 1934–1938: Georg Brückmann
- 1938–1945: Ernst Missler
- 1945–1945: Theodor Kräge
- 1945–1946: Willy Klapproth
- 1946–1954: Joseph Treffert, CDU
- 1954–1972: Wilhelm Kilian, CDU
- 1972–2002: Georg Stolle, CDU
- 2002–2014: Thorsten Herrmann, CDU
- 2014–2020: Rolf Richter, CDU
- 2020–incumbent: Christine Klein, SPD

=== Coat of arms ===
The town's arms might be described thus: Gules a knight with kontos, held in both hands, and armour Or astride a steed salient argent, the whole sinister, below which a dragon statant reguardant sinister vert, the knight's kontos thrust through it.

The German blazon says that the kontos, or lance, is golden, and that the dragon is green, although the achievement shown here, whose source is the town administration itself, shows different tinctures for these two charges.

The red field refers to the Mainz coat of arms, as the town was owned by the Bishopric of Mainz until 1802. The knight slaying the dragon represents Saint George, who was said in earlier times to have been Bensheim's patron saint.

=== Town partnerships ===
- Beaune, Côte-d'Or, France, since 1960
- Amersham, Buckinghamshire, United Kingdom, since 1977
- Mohács, Baranya County, Hungary, since 1987
- Riva del Garda, Trentino, Italy, since 1989
- Kłodzko, Lower Silesia, Poland, since 1996
- Hostinné, Hradec Králové Region, Czech Republic, since 2002

Moreover, some outlying centres have their own separate partnerships.

=== Sponsorship ===
On 29 April 1956, a Patenschaft (roughly, "sponsorship") was set up for Sudeten Germans driven out of the town of Arnau (now Hostinné in the Czech Republic) on the Elbe in the Hohenelbe district.

== Culture and sightseeing ==
=== Theatre ===
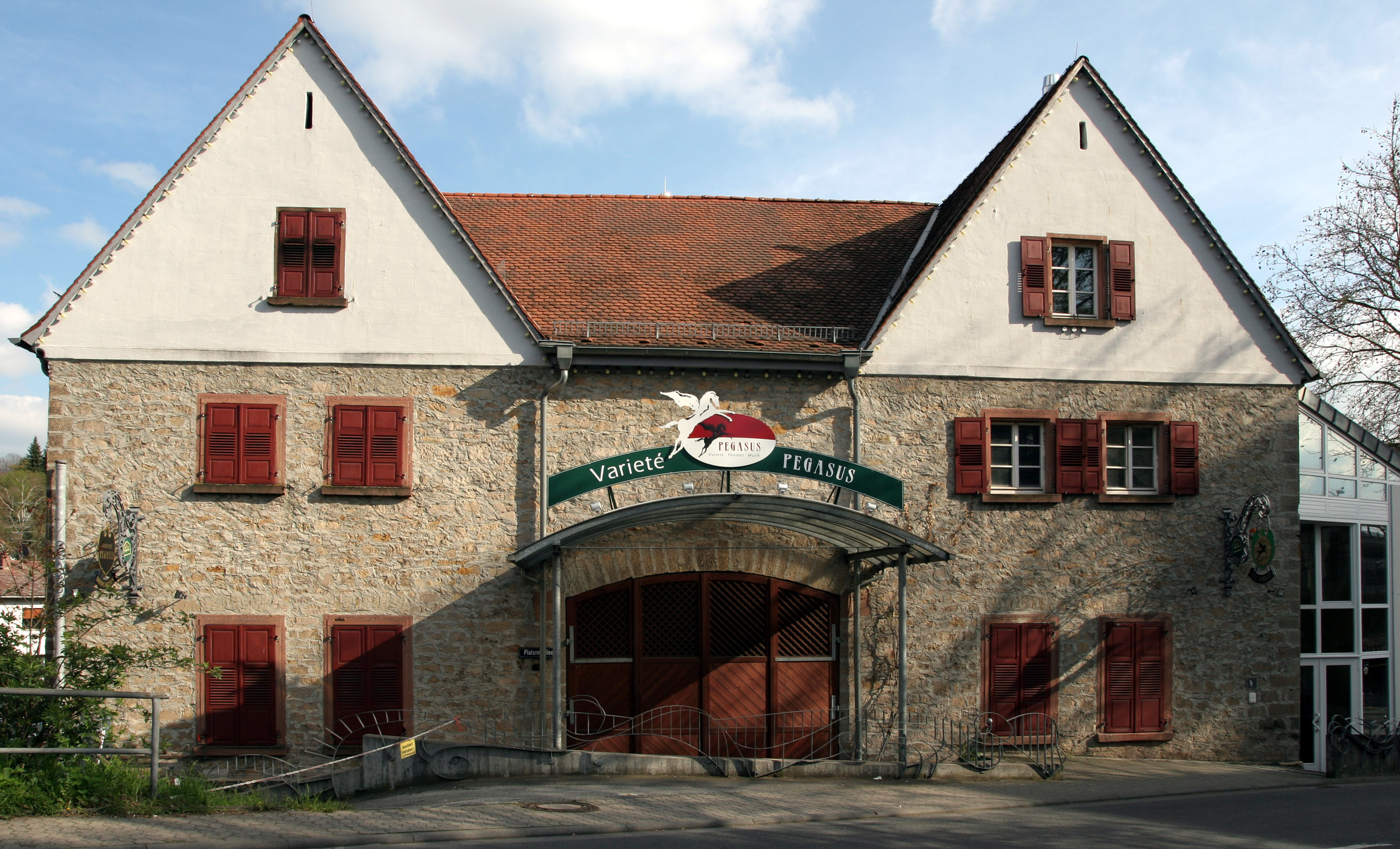
The Varieté Pegasus in the Old Tannery

The Parktheater was built in 1968 and offers cultural activities. Besides the municipal programme of plays, freelance producers, clubs and schools bring a multifaceted programme in the fields of spoken theatre, musical theatre and dance theatre. From October 1998 to December 1999, the Parktheater was optically, technologically and artistically made over from the ground up.

Furthermore, Bensheim also has the PiPaPo Theater (cabaret), the Vornerum Theater, the Varieté Pegasus and the Autorenkollektiv Laufkundschaft.

=== Museums ===
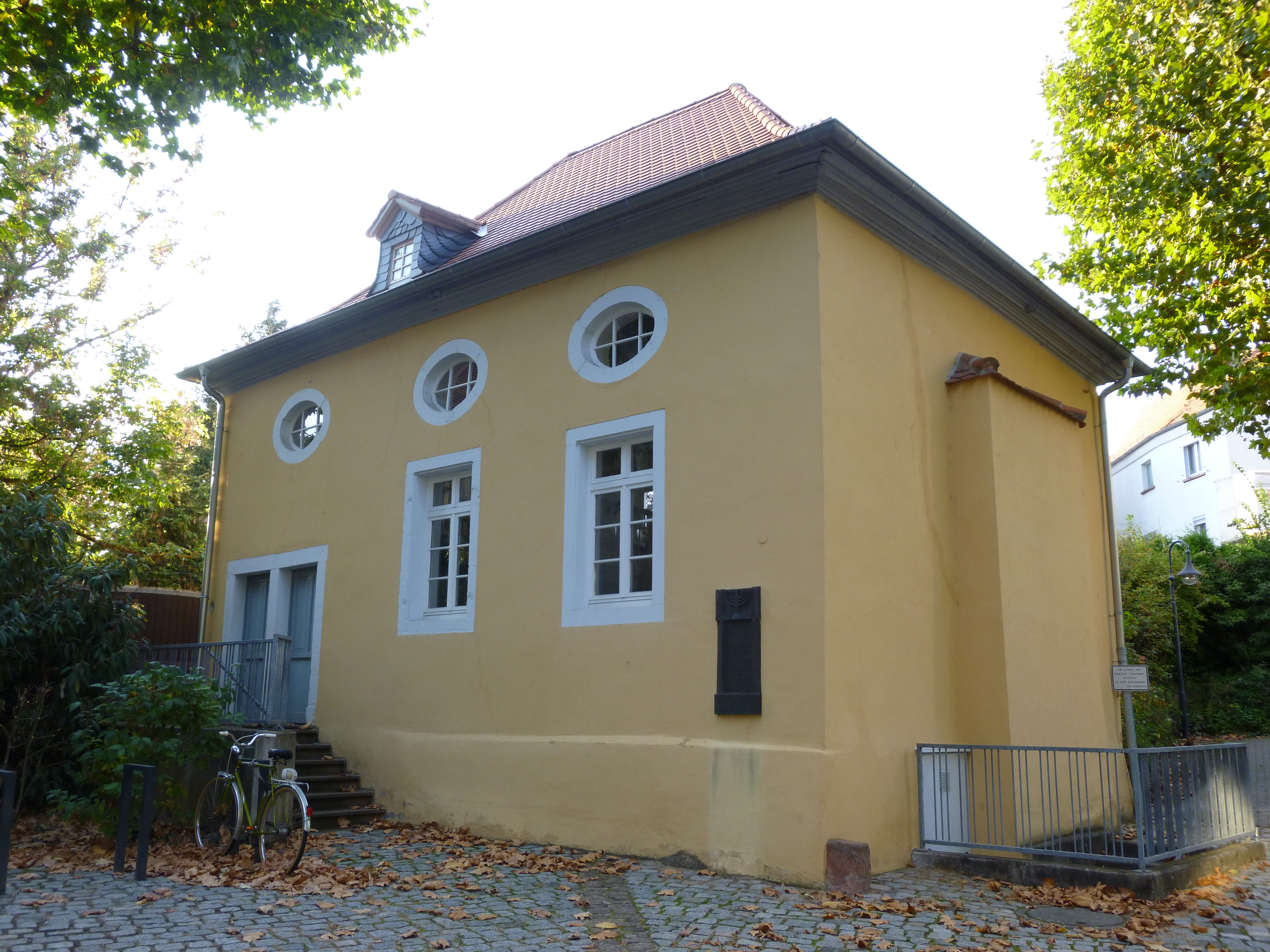
The former Synagogue in Auerbach which nowadays houses a museum

Besides the Museum der Stadt Bensheim (municipal museum), there is also the old synagogue in Auerbach which nowadays houses a museum.

=== Music ===
The Bensheim Music School was founded in 1979. By taking part in various contests, the students at this municipal music school regularly find themselves among the prizewinners at both the state and national level. Many ensembles promote the music school's community spirit.

=== Buildings (secular) ===
Bensheim, along with all its outlying centres has all together 557 cultural monuments. The following is a selection of the town's most important buildings:

- Alte Faktorei, Mainz cathedral chapter's former factory (in the sense of "commercial outpost")
- Alte Gerberei (Old Tannery), from 1873
- Bismarckturm (tower), from 1902, on the Hemsberg (262 m)
- Dalberger Hof, former noble estate
- "Luginsland" (Blaues Türmchen or Eckturm [tower]) on the Höhenweg above Baßmannpark, built in 1910
- Hohenecker Hof, former noble estate from 1756
- Kirchberghäuschen (220 m), built in 1849, dedicated in 1857
- Metzendorf-Villen (villas)
- Rinnentorturm (tower), from the 13th or 14th century
- Rodensteiner Hof, stately home with park
- Roter Turm, watchtower from the old town wall, from the 13th century
- Walderdorffer Hof, southern Hesse's oldest timber-frame house, built in 1395
- Wambolter Hof, former noble estate from about 1732/33

The Landgraves of Hesse once used the Fürstenlager near Bensheim-Auerbach as a spa. It is an artistic combination of simple buildings clustered like a village around the Good Well in the middle of a picturesque landscaped park. Like many territorial overlords of their day, its owners sought the peace of a rural idyll far removed from the pomp and circumstance of court.

=== Buildings (ecclesiastical) ===
- Saint George's Parish Church (Pfarrkirche St. Georg), from 1830
- Saint Joseph's Hospital Church (Hospitalkirche St. Joseph), from the 14th century
- Saint Crescentius's Graveyard Church (Friedhofskirche St. Crescens), from 1618
- Saint Michael's Church (Michaelskirche), from 1863
- Saint Lawrence's Catholic Parish Church (Katholische Pfarrkirche St. Laurentius), from 1965

All the above churches are Catholic, except Saint Michael's, which is Evangelical.

All 557 cultural monuments are listed in the Liste der Kulturdenkmäler in Bensheim.

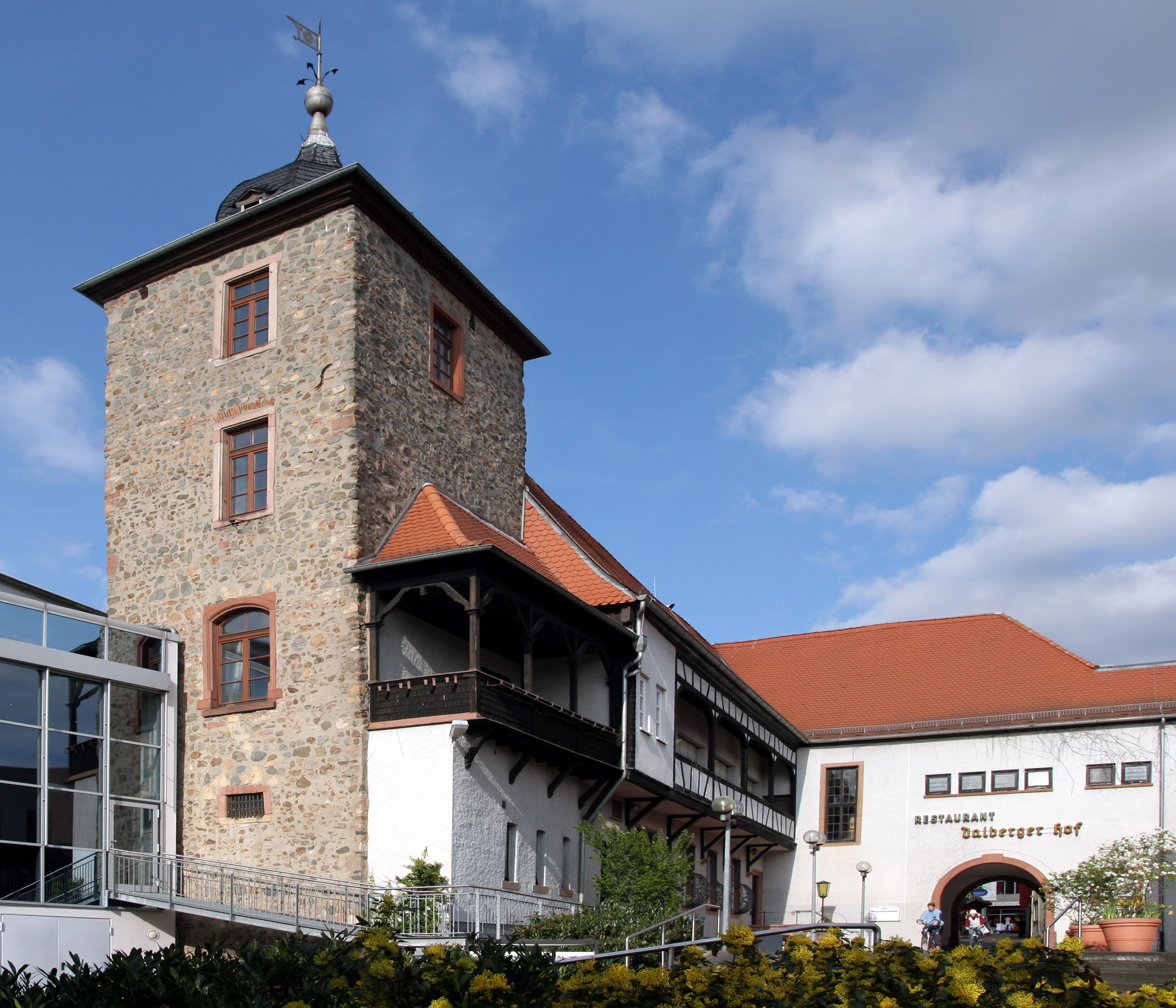
Dalberger Hof

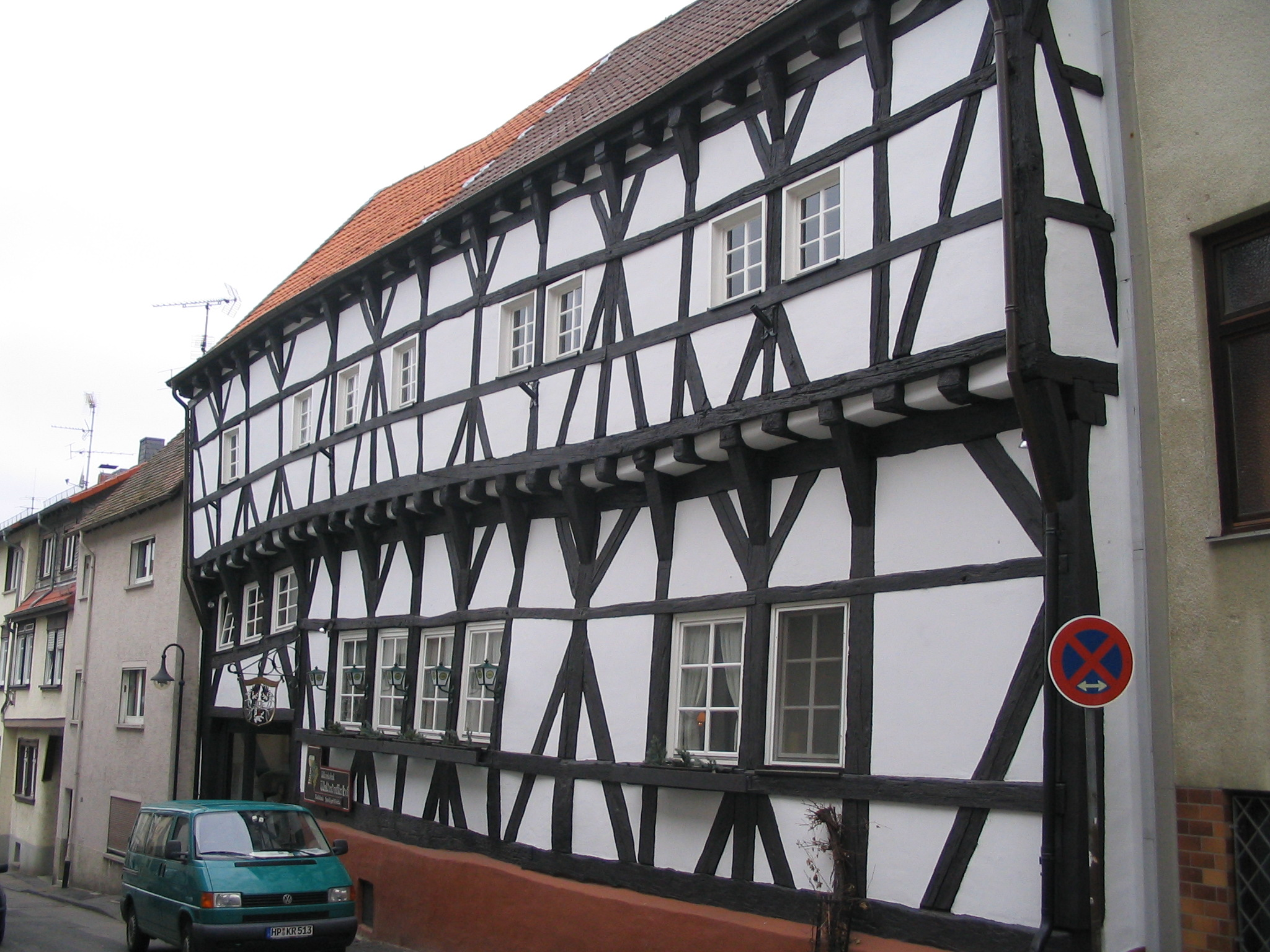
Walderdorffer Hof

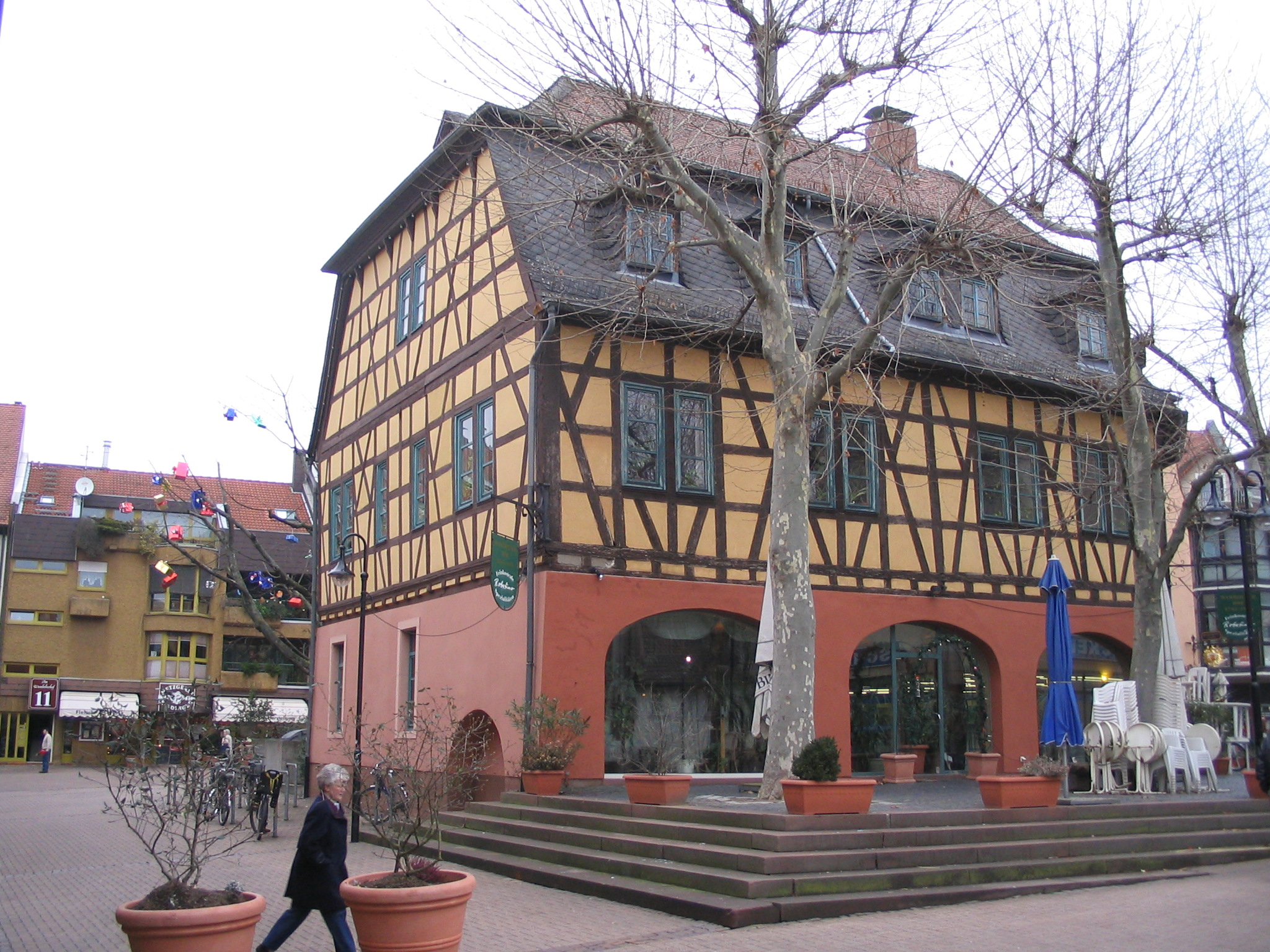
Wambolter Hof

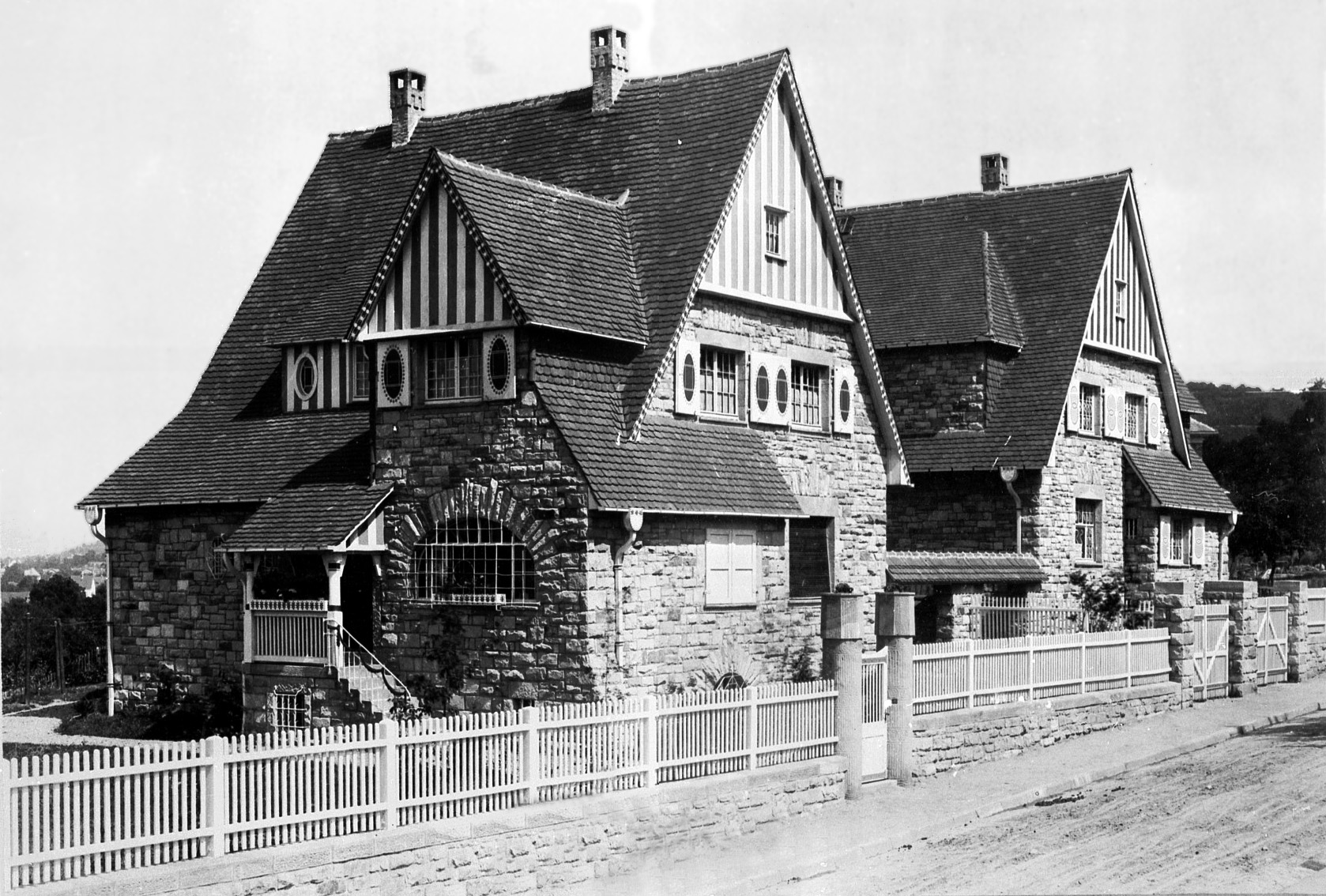
Villa Ernst (Ludwigstraße) by Heinrich Metzendorf, 1905

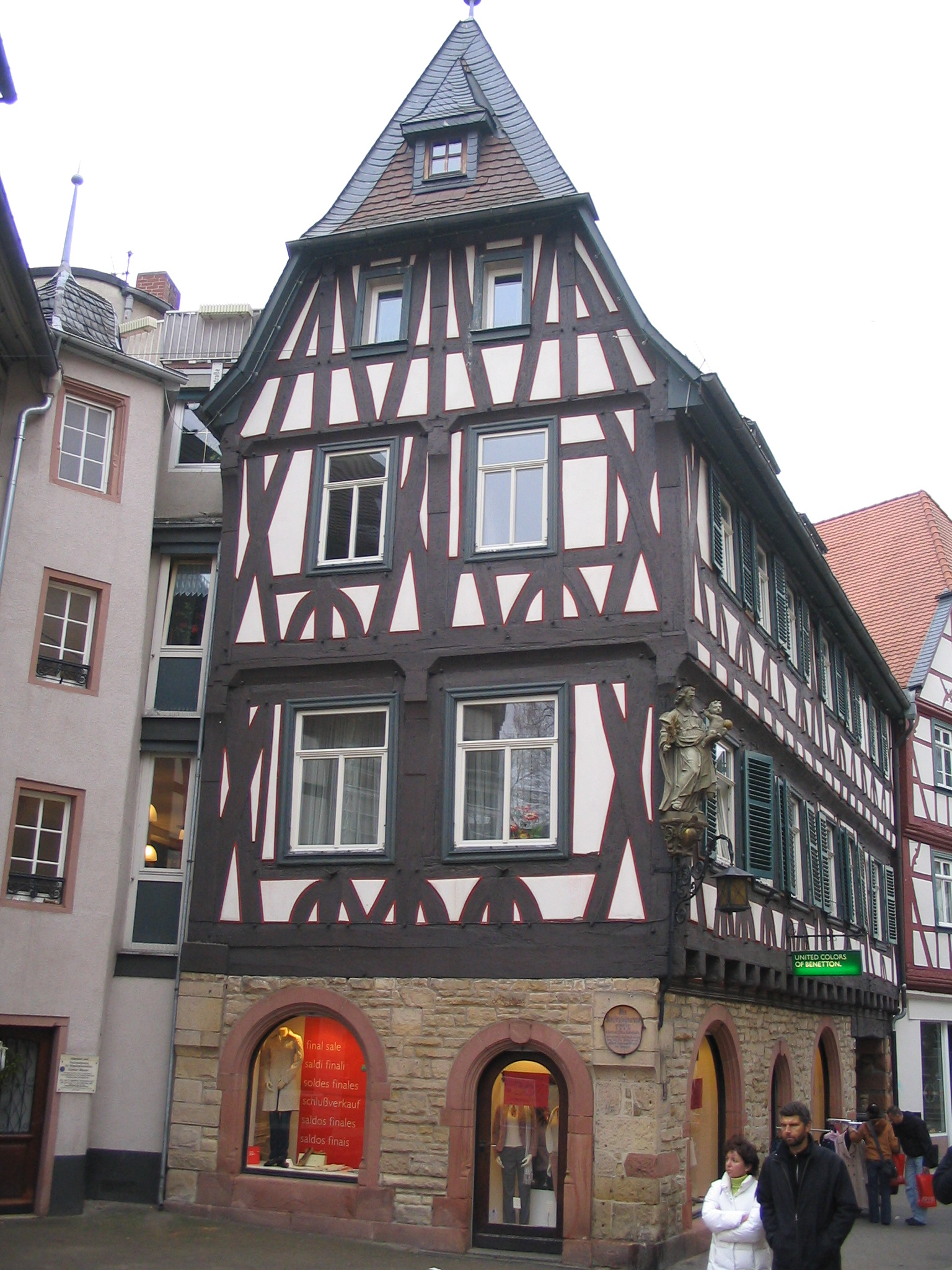
Flecksches Haus

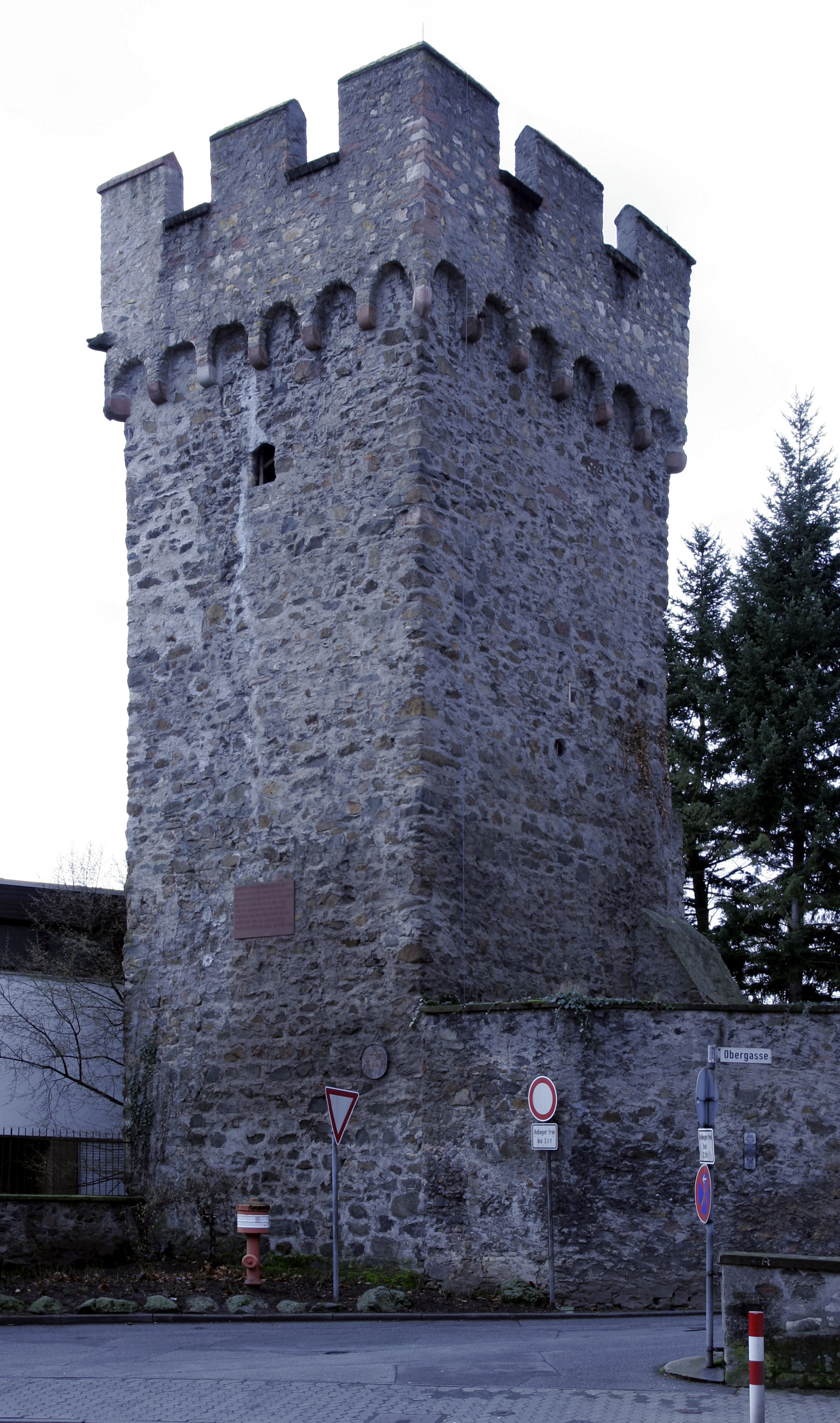
Rote Turm from about 1300

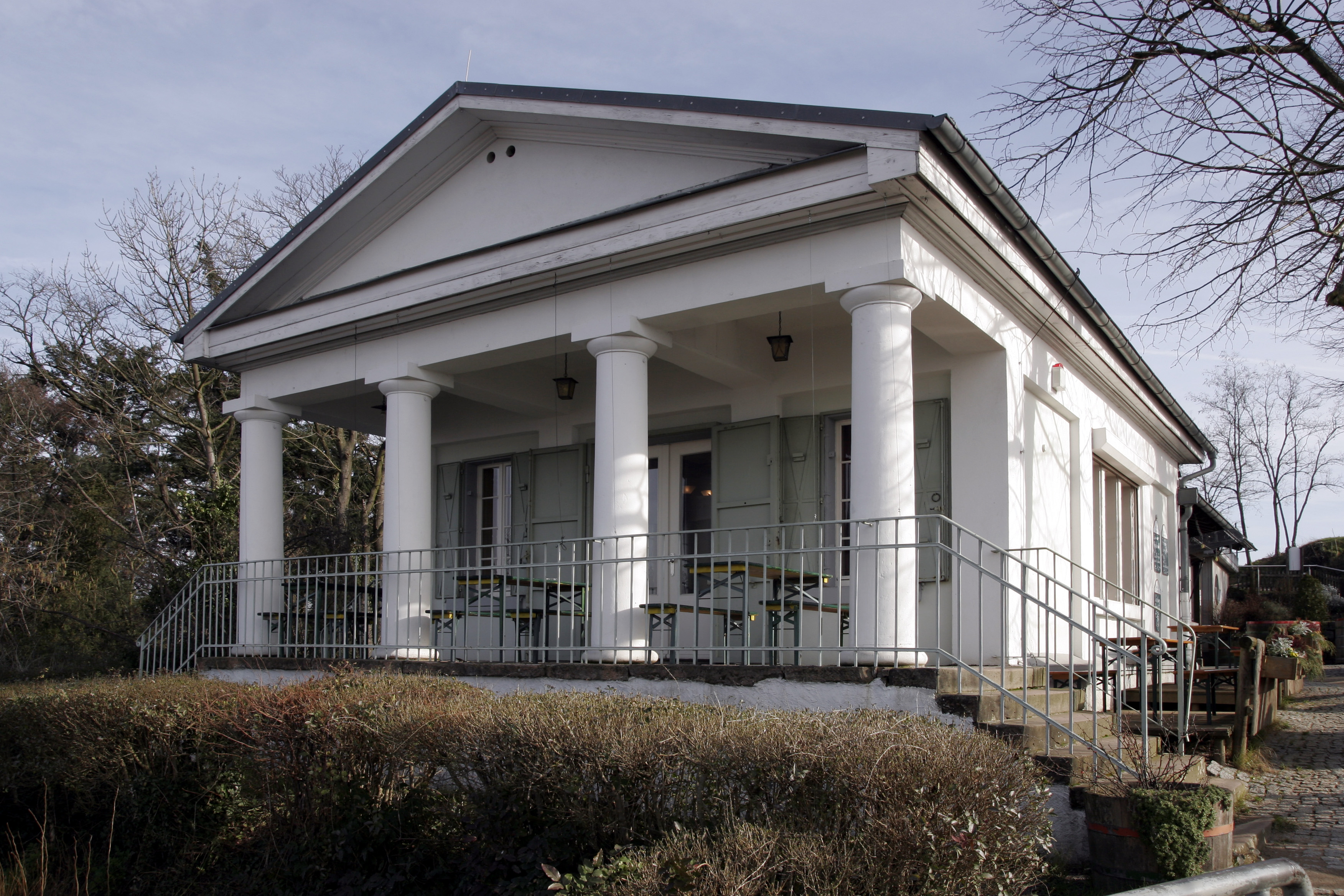
Kirchberghäuschen

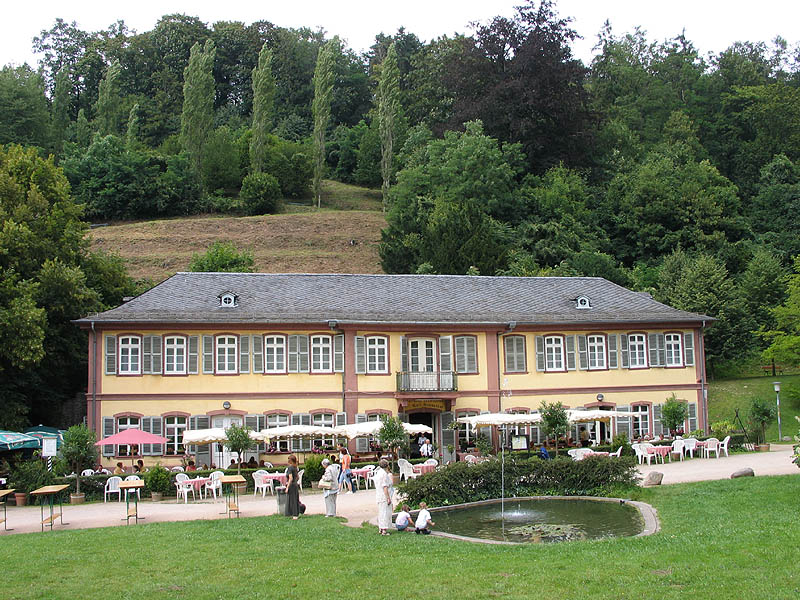
Fürstenlager near Bensheim

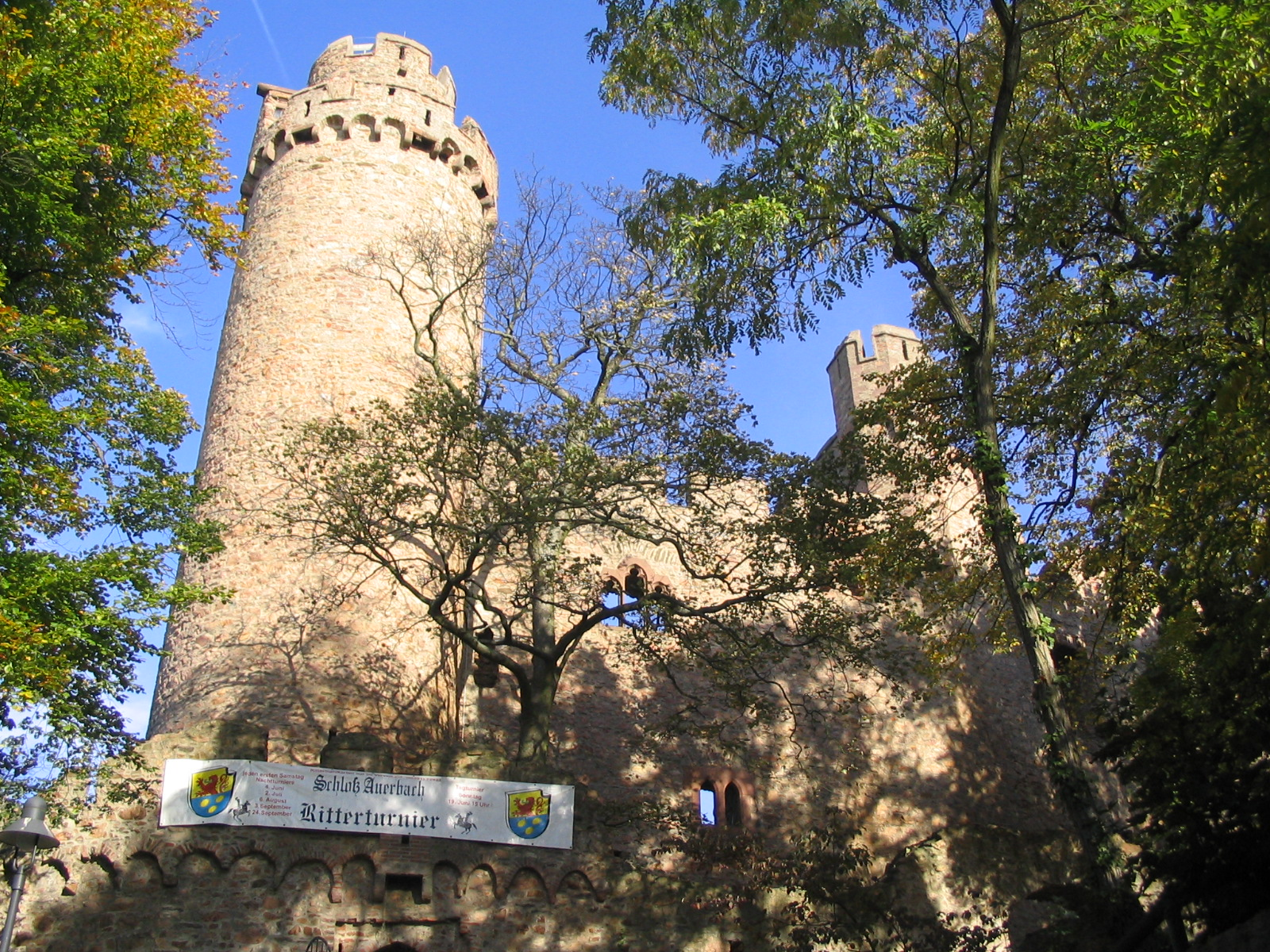
Auerbach Castle

=== Sport ===
Nationally known is the HSG Bensheim/Auerbach women's handball team, which plays in the 1. Handball-Bundesliga.

Bensheim and its outlying centres are also home to many other sport clubs.

== Denominational Institute ==
Since 1947, Bensheim has been home to the Evangelical Federation's Konfessionskundliches Institut ("Denominational Institute"), Europe's biggest ecumenical institute. It was housed at Wolfgang-Sucker-Haus from 1947 to 1967 and also has been once again since November 2007.

=== Youth culture ===
Bensheim has many offerings for children up to 14 years old, with, for example, a new youth centre, opened on 26 January 2006 offering ample possibilities, busying itself with this. The old, bigger youth centre on Wilhelmstraße was then closed. For youths, there is relatively little on offer. However, work has begun on the new Skate/BMX-park, on the same site where the old one was. The park was promoted and planned by youths themselves.

Bandsheim ("Band Home") has afforded the youth music scene an outlet that regularly hosts "newcomer" concerts in Bensheim. Besides Bandsheim there is also an outlet in Party-Bensheim, which offers a venue for youths to get to know each other, have discussions and make arrangements. Both these outlets were founded by youths themselves.

Bensheim does host an "unofficial" youth club. Since the early 1980s there has been "McSlobos", an inn that had its beginnings in the "Germania-Hof", which has now been torn down. With many live concerts by famous local bands and the guests' active engagement in political issues, this inn has grown into an attraction for many youths.

Nevertheless, many youths feel left out, as they must pay for all leisure activities. Hence there has also been for some time the will to create a self-administering youth centre. To this end, various action groups and campaigns have been started, such as, for example SKJuz, a "promotional club for a self-administering culture and youth centre in Bensheim", and the action group BürgerMaiStar.

In 2010 about 50 young people from the region occupied a derelict army complex in order to establish a self-organised youth centre. However, the occupation was broken up by police several hours after it had begun.

As a follow-up to the SKJuz club the JUKUZ Bensheim e.V. was formed, which is still actively promoting the idea of a self-administered, self-organised youth centre.

== Regular events ==
The nationally known Bergsträßer Winzerfest ("Bergstraße Vintners' Festival") is held every first week in September throughout the inner town. The festival, which begins on the Saturday, lasts nine days. On the first Sunday there is a great festive parade, and on the second Saturday, fireworks are lit on the Kirchberg. The first Bergsträßer Winzerfest was held from 19 to 22 October 1929. Even at this first festival there were a festive parade and fireworks on the Kirchberg. Bensheim is in an area where wine grapes are grown extensively.

The Bürgerfest ("Citizens' Festival"), which was introduced on the occasion of the opening of the pedestrian precinct in 1975, has been regularly celebrated in early summer since 1977. Great popularity is enjoyed by the Auerbacher Bachgassenfest, an outdoor gastronomical event put on by those who live on the Bachgasse ("Brook Lane") in Auerbach, first held in 1987. Since 1986, in memory of Gertrud Eysoldt, a German actress and director, the Gertrud-Eysoldt-Ring, one of Germany's most important theatrical prizes, has been awarded yearly.

Since 2003, the Maiway has been held every year. This is a gastronomical festival at which many pubs in Bensheim have musical groups perform.

=== Culinary specialities ===
Bensheim has Zwewwelkuche à la Fraa vun Bensem ("onion cake à la woman from Bensheim"). The first word is a local form of the German Zwiebelkuchen, and the woman is the one mentioned under History (see above).

== Economy and infrastructure ==
=== Established businesses ===
Bensheim is part of the economically strong Rhine Neckar Area and is together with various neighbouring towns and communities (among others, Heppenheim, Lorsch and Lautertal) identified as a middle centre in South Hesse regional planning.

The town has in its favour good economic data – even in relation to the Rhine Neckar Area's as a whole – above-average employment figures and an especially high proportion of graduates in the resident population's above-average buying power.

Sirona Dental Systems GmbH has its head office in Bensheim. The enterprise is the district's biggest employer and produces goods and services for dentists. Kern GmbH manufactures enveloping systems for banks, insurance companies, telecommunications businesses and information technology service providers and is also headquartered in Bensheim. Offering services to pharmaceutical businesses is Cegedim Deutschland GmbH, which also has its head office in Bensheim. Furthermore, there are the electronics firm Tyco Electronics AMP GmbH, SAP AG, which is active in the information technology field, the Institut für Organisationskommunikation (IFOK) and HTV GmbH, which tests and programs semiconductors for manufacturers from almost all fields of electronics. Also, the auto manufacturer Suzuki International Europe GmbH is headquartered in Bensheim. The cars in the company's national television advertising bear registrations beginning with "HP" (Heppenheim/Kreis Bergstraße) for this reason, which is seldom otherwise seen in this context. Deutsche Papier Vertriebs GmbH, which belongs to PaperlinX, runs, as a nationally active paper wholesaler, one of Germany's most modern high-bay warehouses. GGEW, a service-providing business for electricity, natural gas and drinking water, has its head office in Bensheim.

=== Media ===
Local happenings are reported in Bensheim and the surrounding area are reported by the Bergsträßer Anzeiger, a newspaper belonging to the Mannheimer Morgen publishing group. The paper's address is Rodensteinstraße 6 and it is published from Monday to Saturday.

=== Transport ===
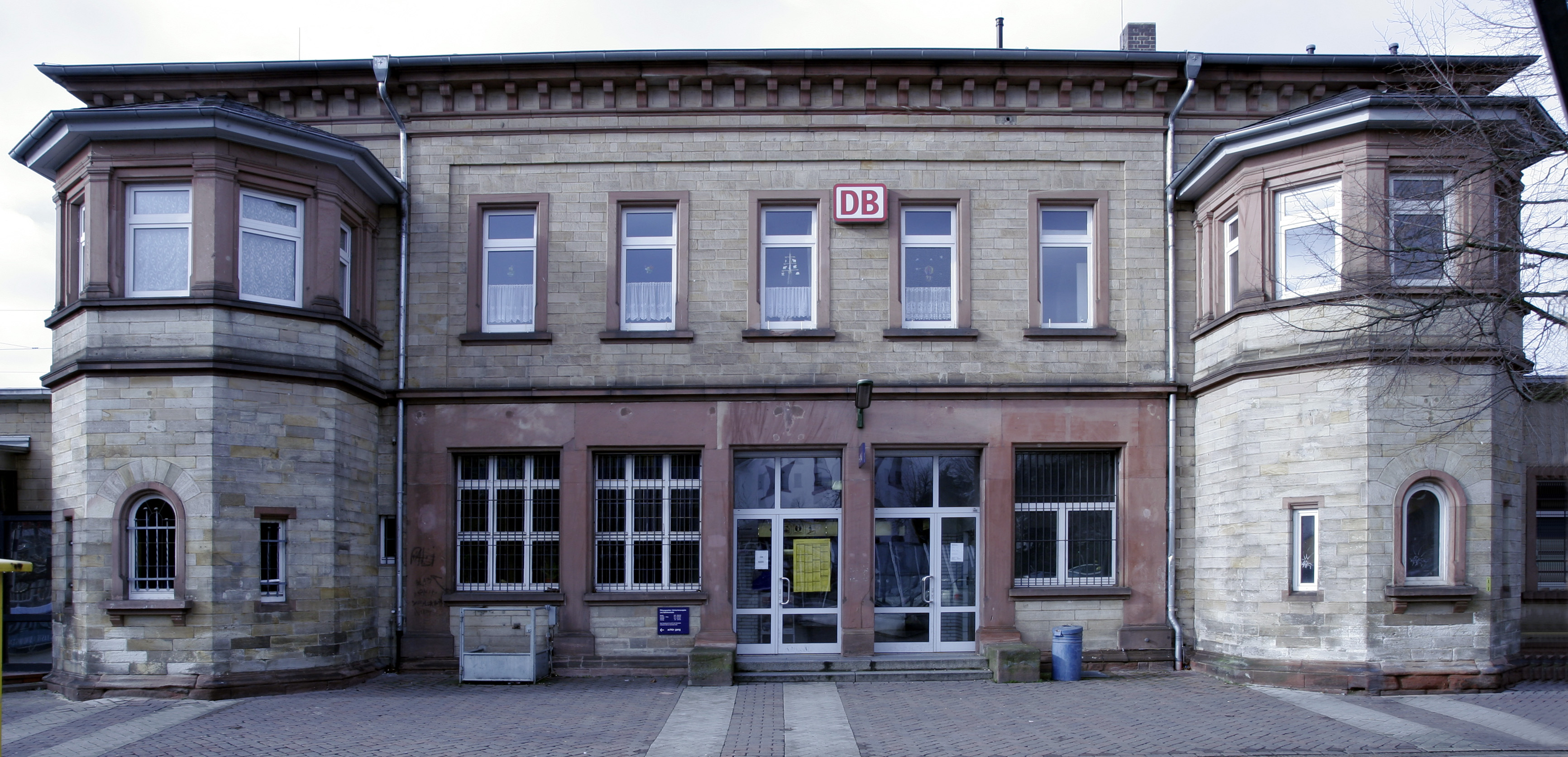
Bensheim station

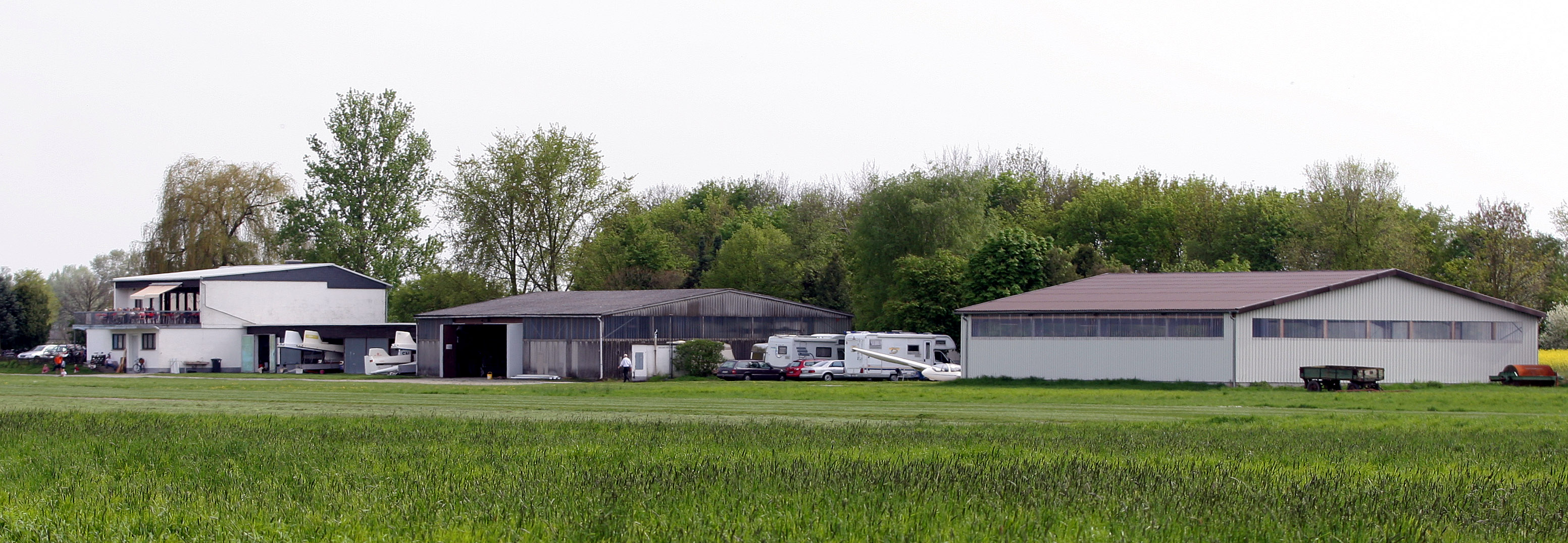
Bensheim airport

Bensheim lies at the crossroads of federal highways B 3 and B 47. Through the town's west end runs Autobahn A 5, from which Bensheim can be reached by two exits: in the north the Zwingenberg – Bensheim-Auerbach exit, and in the south the Bensheim exit. A few kilometres farther west, running parallel to the A 5, is the A 67, when Bensheim can be reached through the Lorsch exit.

From Bensheim station, the town is linked to the German InterCity network by the Frankfurt am Main–Heidelberg line. The station is also the end of the Nibelungen Railway from Worms to Bensheim. The outlying centre of Auerbach has its own station, Bensheim-Auerbach, on the Frankfurt-Heidelberg line, but only Regionalbahn trains stop there.

Frankfurt Airport lies just under 50 kilometres (31 miles) away by road, north of Bensheim. There is a gliderport at Bensheim for gliders, motor gliders and other, smaller aircraft, managed by a nonprofit gliding club (SFG Bensheim).

=== Education ===
Bensheim is a school town, with five Gymnasien: the Altes Kurfürstliches Gymnasium, the Geschwister-Scholl-Schule (coöperative comprehensive school with Gymnasium upper level), the Goethe-Gymnasium Bensheim (Gymnasium from class 5 with Gymnasium upper level), the Karl-Kübel-Schule (commercial schools with Gymnasium for economics, technology and health) and the Liebfrauenschule (private Catholic Gymnasium for girls). The town also has the Schillerschule, which is a primary school, Hauptschule and Realschule.

Offering adult education are the Volkshochschule Bensheim and the Frauen- und Familienzentrum Bensheim, with about 2,000 participants each year the biggest family meeting place in Kreis Bergstraße.

Primary schools

- Grundschule Kappesgärten
- Hemsbergschule
- Joseph-Heckler Schule
- Kirchbergschule
- Schloßbergschule

Primary school/Hauptschule/Realschule

- Schillerschule

Cooperative comprehensive school

- Geschwister Scholl Schule

Vocational schools

- Berufsbildungszentrum
- Heinrich-Metzendorf-Schule

Advisory and advocacy centres

- Behindertenhilfe Bergstraße GmbH (help for the handicapped)
- Schule für Lernhilfe (school for help with learning)
- Seebergschule für praktisch Bildbare (practically educable)

== Notable people ==
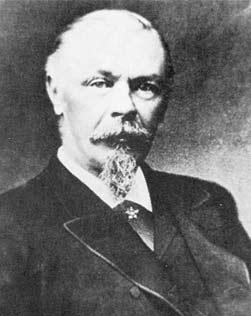
Arthur von Oettingen

- Sir William Curtius (1599–1678), 1st Curtius Baronet of Sweden, FRS, diplomat
- Friedrich von Eichheimer (1764–1854), Bavarian military physician and Surgeon General of the Bavarian army
- Elsa Fraenkel (1892–1975), sculptor
- Heike B. Görtemaker (born 1964), historian
- Heinz Jost (1904–1964), SS-Brigadeführer, major general of the police, Amtschef in the SD-Hauptamt Amt III (Abwehr), Chief of RSHA-Amt VI
- Paul Kleinschmidt (1883–1949), painter
- Josefine Koebe (born 1988), social democratic politician and economist
- Matthias Lorenz (born 1964), classical cellist
- Michael Meister (born 1961), Member of the Bundestag (CDU)
- Norbert Müller-Everling (born 1953), sculptor
- Arthur von Oettingen (1836–1920), Baltic-German physicist, musical theorist and biographer
- Wilhelm Ringelband (1921–1981), theatre critic, endower of the Gertrud-Eysoldt-Ring
- Bernhard Trares (born 1965), footballer and football trainer
- Heinrich Werlé (1887–1955), choir director and music critic
- Otto-Werner Mueller (born 1926), conductor and musical educator

== Twin towns – sister cities ==
Bensheim is twinned with:

- Amersham, England, United Kingdom
- Beaune, France
- Hostinné, Czech Republic
- Kłodzko, Poland
- Mohács, Hungary
- Riva del Garda, Italy
