= Meanings of minor-planet names: 301001–302000 =

As minor planet discoveries are confirmed, they are given a permanent number by the IAU's Minor Planet Center (MPC), and the discoverers can then submit names for them, following the IAU's naming conventions. The list below concerns those minor planets in the specified number-range that have received names, and explains the meanings of those names.

Official naming citations of newly named small Solar System bodies are approved and published in a bulletin by IAU's Working Group for Small Bodies Nomenclature (WGSBN). Before May 2021, citations were published in MPC's Minor Planet Circulars for many decades. Recent citations can also be found on the JPL Small-Body Database (SBDB). Until his death in 2016, German astronomer Lutz D. Schmadel compiled these citations into the Dictionary of Minor Planet Names (DMP) and regularly updated the collection.

Based on Paul Herget's The Names of the Minor Planets, Schmadel also researched the unclear origin of numerous asteroids, most of which had been named prior to World War II. This article incorporates text from this source, which is in the public domain: SBDB New namings may only be added to this list below after official publication as the preannouncement of names is condemned. The WGSBN publishes a comprehensive guideline for the naming rules of non-cometary small Solar System bodies.

== 301001–301100 ==
Named minor planet	Provisional	This minor planet was named for...	Ref · Catalog
301021 Sofiarodriguez	2008 SJ_{11}	Sofia Rodriguez (born 2014), great-granddaughter of the American discoverer James Whitney Young	JPL · 301021
301061 Egelsbach	2008 UO_{91}	Egelsbach, a German city located between Frankfurt am Main and Darmstadt.	JPL · 301061

== 301101–301200 ==
back to top

Named minor planet	Provisional	This minor planet was named for...	Ref · Catalog
301128 Frédéricpont	2008 WV_{96}	Frédéric Pont, Swiss astrophysicist.	IAU · 301128
301153 Jinan	2008 YO_{9}	The Chinese city of Jinan, also known as "Tsinan" or "Spring City", is the capital of the Shandong province in Eastern China, and the location of the Shandong University's main campus.	IAU · 301153

== 301201–301300 ==
back to top

Named minor planet	Provisional	This minor planet was named for...	Ref · Catalog
301263 Anitaheward	2009 BB_{77}	Anita Heward (born 1974) is a freelance science communicator working for Europlanet, the Royal Astronomical Society and Twinkle space mission. She was the founder of the British Festival of Space, assisted in establishing the UK National Space Centre in Leicester, UK, and encourages gender equality in science.	JPL · 301263

== 301301–301400 ==
back to top

Named minor planet	Provisional	This minor planet was named for...	Ref · Catalog
301394 Bensheim	2009 DB_{31}	Bensheim, a town in Hesse, Germany, first mentioned in 765 AD.	JPL · 301394

== 301401–301500 ==
back to top

Named minor planet	Provisional	This minor planet was named for...	Ref · Catalog
301413 Rogerfux	2009 DN_{46}	Roger Fux, Swiss astrophysicist.	IAU · 301413

== 301501–301600 ==
back to top

Named minor planet	Provisional	This minor planet was named for...	Ref · Catalog
301511 Hubinon	2009 FJ_{5}	Victor Hubinon (1924–1979) was a Belgian comic book artist. With Jean-Michel Charlier, he created the series Buck Danny.	JPL · 301511
301522 Chaykin	2009 FX_{23}	Konstantin Yurievich Chaykin (born 1975) is a Russian watchmaker and inventor. He is a creator of the most complicated watches in the world and has won many international awards.	IAU · 301522
301552 Alimenti	2009 GA_{3}	Alessandro Alimenti, Italian physicist turned physician.	IAU · 301552
301553 Ninaglebova	2009 GM_{3}	Nina Il'inichna Glebova (born 1937) is a senior scientific worker at the IAA RAS, and was the Editor-in-Chief of the Astronomical Yearbook for many years.	JPL · 301553
301566 Melissajane	2009 HF_{36}	Melissa Jane Forward (born 1980), youngest daughter of British discoverer Norman Falla	JPL · 301566

== 301601–301700 ==
back to top

Named minor planet	Provisional	This minor planet was named for...	Ref · Catalog
301622 Chastel	2010 DZ_{77}	Serge Chastel (b. 1971), a software engineer at the University of Hawaii.	IAU · 301622
301623 Wynn-Williams	2010 DA_{78}	Gareth Wynn-Williams (b. 1944), a British-American astronomer.	IAU · 301623
301638 Kressin	2010 EQ_{45}	Margarete Kressin (1891–1980), grandmother of German discoverer Rainer Kracht	JPL · 301638

== 301701–301800 ==
back to top

Named minor planet	Provisional	This minor planet was named for...	Ref · Catalog
301794 Antoninkapustin	2010 LH_{64}	Andrey Ivanovich Kapustin (archimandrite Antonin) (1817–1894) was the head of the Russian Ecclesiastic Mission in Jerusalem.	JPL · 301794

== 301801–301900 ==
back to top

Named minor planet	Provisional	This minor planet was named for...	Ref · Catalog
There are no named minor planets in this number range

== 301901–302000 ==
back to top

Named minor planet	Provisional	This minor planet was named for...	Ref · Catalog
301946 Bugyi	2000 BK_{15}	István Bugyi (1898–1981), a Hungarian physician and university professor.	IAU · 301946
301949 Hambálek	2000 CM_{34}	Ľubomír Hambálek (b. 1983), a Slovak astronomer.	IAU · 301949

back to top

Preceded by 300,001–301,000	Meanings of minor-planet names List of minor planets: 301,001–302,000	Succeeded by 302,001–303,000
