= List of minor planets: 301001–302000 =

The following is a partial list of minor planets, running from minor-planet number 301001 through 302000, inclusive. The primary data for this and other partial lists is based on JPL's "Small-Body Orbital Elements" and data available from the Minor Planet Center. Critical list information is also provided by the MPC, unless otherwise specified from Lowell Observatory. A detailed description of the table's columns and additional sources are given on the main page including a complete list of every page in this series, and a statistical break-up on the dynamical classification of minor planets.

Also see the summary list of all named bodies in numerical and alphabetical order, and the corresponding naming citations for the number range of this particular list. New namings may only be added to this list after official publication, as the preannouncement of names is condemned by the Working Group for Small Bodies Nomenclature of the International Astronomical Union.

Near-Earth obj.	MBA (inner)	MBA (outer)	Centaur
Mars-crosser	MBA (middle)	Jupiter trojan	Trans-Neptunian obj.
Unclassified

== 301001–301100 ==
Designation			Discovery			Properties		Ref
Permanent	Provisional	Named after	Date	Site	Discoverer(s)	Category	Diam.	Ref
301001	2008 GE_{92}	—	April 6, 2008	Mount Lemmon	Mount Lemmon Survey	·	3.8 km	MPC · JPL
301002	2008 GQ_{98}	—	April 8, 2008	Kitt Peak	Spacewatch	L5	13 km	MPC · JPL
301003	2008 GU_{98}	—	April 9, 2008	Mount Lemmon	Mount Lemmon Survey	·	2.7 km	MPC · JPL
301004	2008 GH_{117}	—	April 11, 2008	Kitt Peak	Spacewatch	TIR	3.6 km	MPC · JPL
301005	2008 GL_{117}	—	April 11, 2008	Kitt Peak	Spacewatch	L5	11 km	MPC · JPL
301006	2008 GH_{120}	—	April 12, 2008	Catalina	CSS	EUP	6.5 km	MPC · JPL
301007	2008 GM_{140}	—	April 7, 2008	Kitt Peak	Spacewatch	L5	9.4 km	MPC · JPL
301008	2008 GK_{141}	—	April 14, 2008	Kitt Peak	Spacewatch	L5	8.8 km	MPC · JPL
301009	2008 GS_{141}	—	April 7, 2008	Kitt Peak	Spacewatch	L5	8.6 km	MPC · JPL
301010	2008 HB_{61}	—	April 30, 2008	Kitt Peak	Spacewatch	L5 · (17492)	12 km	MPC · JPL
301011	2008 JO	—	May 2, 2008	Catalina	CSS	APO	740 m	MPC · JPL
301012	2008 JL_{17}	—	May 3, 2008	Mount Lemmon	Mount Lemmon Survey	L5	9.4 km	MPC · JPL
301013	2008 JJ_{18}	—	May 4, 2008	Kitt Peak	Spacewatch	L5	10 km	MPC · JPL
301014	2008 KX_{20}	—	July 27, 2005	Palomar	NEAT	·	1.9 km	MPC · JPL
301015	2008 PW_{16}	—	August 12, 2008	La Sagra	OAM	H	880 m	MPC · JPL
301016	2008 QJ_{32}	—	August 30, 2008	Socorro	LINEAR	·	1.0 km	MPC · JPL
301017	2008 RF_{107}	—	September 7, 2008	Mount Lemmon	Mount Lemmon Survey	·	620 m	MPC · JPL
301018	2008 RN_{126}	—	September 3, 2008	Kitt Peak	Spacewatch	L4	10 km	MPC · JPL
301019	2008 RX_{129}	—	September 7, 2008	Mount Lemmon	Mount Lemmon Survey	·	660 m	MPC · JPL
301020	2008 RW_{146}	—	September 4, 2008	Kitt Peak	Spacewatch	·	3.3 km	MPC · JPL
301021 Sofiarodriguez	2008 SJ_{11}	Sofiarodriguez	September 23, 2008	Wrightwood	J. W. Young	·	880 m	MPC · JPL
301022	2008 SZ_{28}	—	September 19, 2008	Kitt Peak	Spacewatch	·	660 m	MPC · JPL
301023	2008 SN_{67}	—	September 21, 2008	Junk Bond	D. Healy	·	780 m	MPC · JPL
301024	2008 SH_{74}	—	September 23, 2008	Catalina	CSS	·	790 m	MPC · JPL
301025	2008 SW_{91}	—	September 21, 2008	Kitt Peak	Spacewatch	·	850 m	MPC · JPL
301026	2008 SH_{104}	—	September 21, 2008	Kitt Peak	Spacewatch	·	760 m	MPC · JPL
301027	2008 SN_{128}	—	September 22, 2008	Kitt Peak	Spacewatch	·	720 m	MPC · JPL
301028	2008 SP_{194}	—	September 25, 2008	Kitt Peak	Spacewatch	·	630 m	MPC · JPL
301029	2008 SW_{205}	—	September 26, 2008	Kitt Peak	Spacewatch	·	840 m	MPC · JPL
301030	2008 SO_{224}	—	September 26, 2008	Kitt Peak	Spacewatch	NYS	1.3 km	MPC · JPL
301031	2008 SA_{243}	—	September 29, 2008	Kitt Peak	Spacewatch	·	890 m	MPC · JPL
301032	2008 SC_{258}	—	September 22, 2008	Mount Lemmon	Mount Lemmon Survey	·	1.1 km	MPC · JPL
301033	2008 SB_{266}	—	September 29, 2008	Kitt Peak	Spacewatch	·	790 m	MPC · JPL
301034	2008 SG_{266}	—	September 20, 2008	Kitt Peak	Spacewatch	·	720 m	MPC · JPL
301035	2008 SH_{268}	—	September 24, 2008	Kitt Peak	Spacewatch	·	790 m	MPC · JPL
301036	2008 SG_{283}	—	September 22, 2008	Mount Lemmon	Mount Lemmon Survey	·	930 m	MPC · JPL
301037	2008 SN_{291}	—	September 22, 2008	Catalina	CSS	L4	11 km	MPC · JPL
301038	2008 SM_{297}	—	September 20, 2008	Kitt Peak	Spacewatch	·	830 m	MPC · JPL
301039	2008 SQ_{305}	—	September 27, 2008	Mount Lemmon	Mount Lemmon Survey	·	760 m	MPC · JPL
301040	2008 TX_{20}	—	October 1, 2008	Mount Lemmon	Mount Lemmon Survey	·	660 m	MPC · JPL
301041	2008 TY_{32}	—	October 1, 2008	Kitt Peak	Spacewatch	·	710 m	MPC · JPL
301042	2008 TX_{38}	—	October 1, 2008	Kitt Peak	Spacewatch	·	560 m	MPC · JPL
301043	2008 TG_{56}	—	October 2, 2008	Kitt Peak	Spacewatch	·	580 m	MPC · JPL
301044	2008 TQ_{65}	—	October 2, 2008	Catalina	CSS	·	980 m	MPC · JPL
301045	2008 TY_{98}	—	October 6, 2008	Kitt Peak	Spacewatch	·	790 m	MPC · JPL
301046	2008 TZ_{112}	—	October 6, 2008	Kitt Peak	Spacewatch	·	790 m	MPC · JPL
301047	2008 TJ_{124}	—	December 8, 2005	Kitt Peak	Spacewatch	·	740 m	MPC · JPL
301048	2008 TB_{162}	—	October 9, 2008	Kitt Peak	Spacewatch	(2076)	820 m	MPC · JPL
301049	2008 TP_{168}	—	October 2, 2008	Mount Lemmon	Mount Lemmon Survey	·	790 m	MPC · JPL
301050	2008 TV_{177}	—	October 8, 2008	Catalina	CSS	·	900 m	MPC · JPL
301051	2008 TP_{180}	—	October 2, 2008	Catalina	CSS	·	1.6 km	MPC · JPL
301052	2008 TY_{187}	—	October 9, 2008	Kitt Peak	Spacewatch	·	760 m	MPC · JPL
301053	2008 UX_{1}	—	October 22, 2008	Junk Bond	D. Healy	·	780 m	MPC · JPL
301054	2008 UT_{13}	—	October 17, 2008	Kitt Peak	Spacewatch	·	860 m	MPC · JPL
301055	2008 US_{26}	—	October 20, 2008	Kitt Peak	Spacewatch	·	680 m	MPC · JPL
301056	2008 UR_{46}	—	October 20, 2008	Kitt Peak	Spacewatch	·	700 m	MPC · JPL
301057	2008 UH_{50}	—	October 20, 2008	Mount Lemmon	Mount Lemmon Survey	·	830 m	MPC · JPL
301058	2008 UX_{61}	—	October 21, 2008	Kitt Peak	Spacewatch	·	970 m	MPC · JPL
301059	2008 UC_{72}	—	October 21, 2008	Kitt Peak	Spacewatch	·	1.8 km	MPC · JPL
301060	2008 UU_{80}	—	October 22, 2008	Mount Lemmon	Mount Lemmon Survey	·	990 m	MPC · JPL
301061 Egelsbach	2008 UO_{91}	Egelsbach	October 28, 2008	Tzec Maun	E. Schwab	·	650 m	MPC · JPL
301062	2008 UA_{103}	—	October 20, 2008	Kitt Peak	Spacewatch	·	780 m	MPC · JPL
301063	2008 UE_{126}	—	October 22, 2008	Kitt Peak	Spacewatch	·	840 m	MPC · JPL
301064	2008 UG_{126}	—	October 22, 2008	Kitt Peak	Spacewatch	·	1.1 km	MPC · JPL
301065	2008 UB_{127}	—	October 22, 2008	Kitt Peak	Spacewatch	·	1.6 km	MPC · JPL
301066	2008 UR_{140}	—	October 23, 2008	Kitt Peak	Spacewatch	·	840 m	MPC · JPL
301067	2008 UC_{143}	—	October 23, 2008	Kitt Peak	Spacewatch	·	570 m	MPC · JPL
301068	2008 UH_{151}	—	October 23, 2008	Kitt Peak	Spacewatch	·	660 m	MPC · JPL
301069	2008 UA_{163}	—	October 24, 2008	Kitt Peak	Spacewatch	·	790 m	MPC · JPL
301070	2008 UJ_{170}	—	October 24, 2008	Catalina	CSS	·	1.0 km	MPC · JPL
301071	2008 UZ_{170}	—	October 24, 2008	Kitt Peak	Spacewatch	·	620 m	MPC · JPL
301072	2008 UZ_{190}	—	October 25, 2008	Mount Lemmon	Mount Lemmon Survey	·	730 m	MPC · JPL
301073	2008 UU_{200}	—	October 27, 2008	Socorro	LINEAR	·	900 m	MPC · JPL
301074	2008 UL_{208}	—	October 23, 2008	Kitt Peak	Spacewatch	·	850 m	MPC · JPL
301075	2008 US_{208}	—	October 23, 2008	Kitt Peak	Spacewatch	·	1.8 km	MPC · JPL
301076	2008 UK_{225}	—	October 25, 2008	Kitt Peak	Spacewatch	·	1.6 km	MPC · JPL
301077	2008 UG_{238}	—	December 27, 2005	Kitt Peak	Spacewatch	·	1 km	MPC · JPL
301078	2008 UF_{247}	—	October 26, 2008	Kitt Peak	Spacewatch	·	1.2 km	MPC · JPL
301079	2008 UV_{254}	—	November 15, 1998	Kitt Peak	Spacewatch	·	820 m	MPC · JPL
301080	2008 UK_{257}	—	October 27, 2008	Kitt Peak	Spacewatch	·	660 m	MPC · JPL
301081	2008 UD_{265}	—	July 14, 2004	Socorro	LINEAR	·	920 m	MPC · JPL
301082	2008 UZ_{266}	—	October 28, 2008	Kitt Peak	Spacewatch	·	1.3 km	MPC · JPL
301083	2008 UV_{287}	—	October 28, 2008	Mount Lemmon	Mount Lemmon Survey	·	640 m	MPC · JPL
301084	2008 UG_{293}	—	October 29, 2008	Kitt Peak	Spacewatch	V	590 m	MPC · JPL
301085	2008 UG_{313}	—	October 30, 2008	Catalina	CSS	·	830 m	MPC · JPL
301086	2008 UQ_{315}	—	October 30, 2008	Kitt Peak	Spacewatch	·	710 m	MPC · JPL
301087	2008 UQ_{338}	—	October 21, 2008	Kitt Peak	Spacewatch	·	740 m	MPC · JPL
301088	2008 UW_{339}	—	October 23, 2008	Kitt Peak	Spacewatch	·	1.3 km	MPC · JPL
301089	2008 UE_{340}	—	October 23, 2008	Mount Lemmon	Mount Lemmon Survey	·	740 m	MPC · JPL
301090	2008 US_{341}	—	October 27, 2008	Kitt Peak	Spacewatch	·	690 m	MPC · JPL
301091	2008 UX_{344}	—	October 31, 2008	Kitt Peak	Spacewatch	NYS ·	2.3 km	MPC · JPL
301092	2008 UG_{345}	—	October 31, 2008	Kitt Peak	Spacewatch	·	720 m	MPC · JPL
301093	2008 UU_{348}	—	October 25, 2008	Mount Lemmon	Mount Lemmon Survey	V	760 m	MPC · JPL
301094	2008 UA_{355}	—	October 30, 2008	Kitt Peak	Spacewatch	·	720 m	MPC · JPL
301095	2008 UQ_{355}	—	October 25, 2008	Kitt Peak	Spacewatch	·	1.3 km	MPC · JPL
301096	2008 UF_{358}	—	October 25, 2008	Kitt Peak	Spacewatch	EUN	1.7 km	MPC · JPL
301097	2008 UN_{360}	—	October 27, 2008	Kitt Peak	Spacewatch	·	800 m	MPC · JPL
301098	2008 UC_{361}	—	October 25, 2008	Catalina	CSS	·	780 m	MPC · JPL
301099	2008 UA_{366}	—	October 27, 2008	Mount Lemmon	Mount Lemmon Survey	·	890 m	MPC · JPL
301100	2008 UF_{369}	—	October 27, 2008	Mount Lemmon	Mount Lemmon Survey	·	920 m	MPC · JPL

== 301101–301200 ==
back to top

Designation			Discovery			Properties		Ref
Permanent	Provisional	Named after	Date	Site	Discoverer(s)	Category	Diam.	Ref
301101	2008 UB_{370}	—	October 28, 2008	Mount Lemmon	Mount Lemmon Survey	EUN	1.7 km	MPC · JPL
301102	2008 VF_{23}	—	November 1, 2008	Kitt Peak	Spacewatch	(2076)	900 m	MPC · JPL
301103	2008 VB_{30}	—	November 2, 2008	Kitt Peak	Spacewatch	·	1.1 km	MPC · JPL
301104	2008 VV_{48}	—	November 3, 2008	Kitt Peak	Spacewatch	·	1.6 km	MPC · JPL
301105	2008 VB_{67}	—	November 7, 2008	Mount Lemmon	Mount Lemmon Survey	·	720 m	MPC · JPL
301106	2008 VW_{69}	—	November 6, 2008	Mount Lemmon	Mount Lemmon Survey	·	1.2 km	MPC · JPL
301107	2008 VG_{70}	—	November 6, 2008	Mount Lemmon	Mount Lemmon Survey	·	790 m	MPC · JPL
301108	2008 VE_{71}	—	November 8, 2008	Kitt Peak	Spacewatch	·	1.0 km	MPC · JPL
301109	2008 VQ_{71}	—	November 1, 2008	Kitt Peak	Spacewatch	·	1.4 km	MPC · JPL
301110	2008 VQ_{77}	—	November 6, 2008	Kitt Peak	Spacewatch	·	1.0 km	MPC · JPL
301111	2008 WC_{1}	—	November 17, 2008	Kitt Peak	Spacewatch	·	1.3 km	MPC · JPL
301112	2008 WT_{1}	—	November 18, 2008	Socorro	LINEAR	·	900 m	MPC · JPL
301113	2008 WP_{23}	—	November 18, 2008	Catalina	CSS	·	800 m	MPC · JPL
301114	2008 WN_{25}	—	November 18, 2008	Kitt Peak	Spacewatch	·	1.0 km	MPC · JPL
301115	2008 WM_{42}	—	November 17, 2008	Kitt Peak	Spacewatch	·	1.2 km	MPC · JPL
301116	2008 WJ_{48}	—	November 17, 2008	Kitt Peak	Spacewatch	MAS	920 m	MPC · JPL
301117	2008 WK_{48}	—	November 17, 2008	Kitt Peak	Spacewatch	·	870 m	MPC · JPL
301118	2008 WG_{50}	—	November 18, 2008	Kitt Peak	Spacewatch	·	790 m	MPC · JPL
301119	2008 WX_{56}	—	October 24, 1998	Kitt Peak	Spacewatch	·	620 m	MPC · JPL
301120	2008 WC_{59}	—	November 22, 2008	Farra d'Isonzo	Farra d'Isonzo	·	1.2 km	MPC · JPL
301121	2008 WE_{59}	—	November 22, 2008	Pla D'Arguines	R. Ferrando	·	750 m	MPC · JPL
301122	2008 WQ_{64}	—	September 28, 2008	Mount Lemmon	Mount Lemmon Survey	·	2.5 km	MPC · JPL
301123	2008 WT_{68}	—	November 18, 2008	Kitt Peak	Spacewatch	·	880 m	MPC · JPL
301124	2008 WN_{70}	—	November 18, 2008	Kitt Peak	Spacewatch	·	790 m	MPC · JPL
301125	2008 WP_{76}	—	November 20, 2008	Kitt Peak	Spacewatch	·	1.4 km	MPC · JPL
301126	2008 WZ_{89}	—	November 22, 2008	Mount Lemmon	Mount Lemmon Survey	V	920 m	MPC · JPL
301127	2008 WT_{91}	—	November 23, 2008	Mount Lemmon	Mount Lemmon Survey	·	3.8 km	MPC · JPL
301128 Frédéricpont	2008 WV_{96}	Frédéricpont	November 28, 2008	Vicques	M. Ory	·	770 m	MPC · JPL
301129	2008 WY_{105}	—	November 30, 2008	Kitt Peak	Spacewatch	·	760 m	MPC · JPL
301130	2008 WJ_{110}	—	November 30, 2008	Kitt Peak	Spacewatch	·	670 m	MPC · JPL
301131	2008 WQ_{116}	—	November 30, 2008	Kitt Peak	Spacewatch	·	670 m	MPC · JPL
301132	2008 WX_{127}	—	November 21, 2008	Kitt Peak	Spacewatch	·	690 m	MPC · JPL
301133	2008 WC_{134}	—	November 19, 2008	Mount Lemmon	Mount Lemmon Survey	·	1.5 km	MPC · JPL
301134	2008 WZ_{134}	—	November 30, 2008	Mount Lemmon	Mount Lemmon Survey	·	970 m	MPC · JPL
301135	2008 XR_{9}	—	December 1, 2008	Catalina	CSS	·	770 m	MPC · JPL
301136	2008 XT_{9}	—	December 1, 2008	Mount Lemmon	Mount Lemmon Survey	·	1.1 km	MPC · JPL
301137	2008 XS_{20}	—	December 1, 2008	Kitt Peak	Spacewatch	V	1.0 km	MPC · JPL
301138	2008 XJ_{37}	—	December 2, 2008	Kitt Peak	Spacewatch	·	1.6 km	MPC · JPL
301139	2008 XM_{38}	—	December 2, 2008	Kitt Peak	Spacewatch	NYS	1.3 km	MPC · JPL
301140	2008 XV_{47}	—	December 4, 2008	Mount Lemmon	Mount Lemmon Survey	·	1.4 km	MPC · JPL
301141	2008 XZ_{47}	—	December 4, 2008	Mount Lemmon	Mount Lemmon Survey	·	1.1 km	MPC · JPL
301142	2008 XF_{48}	—	December 4, 2008	Mount Lemmon	Mount Lemmon Survey	·	1.3 km	MPC · JPL
301143	2008 XJ_{48}	—	December 4, 2008	Mount Lemmon	Mount Lemmon Survey	·	1.7 km	MPC · JPL
301144	2008 XY_{49}	—	December 4, 2008	Mount Lemmon	Mount Lemmon Survey	·	1.7 km	MPC · JPL
301145	2008 XA_{53}	—	December 4, 2008	Mount Lemmon	Mount Lemmon Survey	MAS	720 m	MPC · JPL
301146	2008 XN_{53}	—	December 6, 2008	Bisei SG Center	BATTeRS	·	820 m	MPC · JPL
301147	2008 XR_{53}	—	December 1, 2008	Socorro	LINEAR	·	740 m	MPC · JPL
301148	2008 XW_{55}	—	December 5, 2008	Kitt Peak	Spacewatch	KOR	2.1 km	MPC · JPL
301149	2008 XG_{56}	—	December 4, 2008	Kitt Peak	Spacewatch	·	1.2 km	MPC · JPL
301150	2008 YB_{7}	—	December 23, 2008	Dauban	Kugel, F.	SUL · fast	2.5 km	MPC · JPL
301151	2008 YG_{7}	—	December 19, 2008	La Sagra	OAM	·	1.5 km	MPC · JPL
301152	2008 YT_{7}	—	November 19, 2004	Catalina	CSS	·	1.7 km	MPC · JPL
301153 Jinan	2008 YO_{9}	Jinan	December 25, 2008	Weihai	University, Shandong	·	1.4 km	MPC · JPL
301154	2008 YD_{16}	—	December 21, 2008	Mount Lemmon	Mount Lemmon Survey	·	2.3 km	MPC · JPL
301155	2008 YO_{17}	—	December 21, 2008	Mount Lemmon	Mount Lemmon Survey	·	1.1 km	MPC · JPL
301156	2008 YA_{19}	—	December 21, 2008	Mount Lemmon	Mount Lemmon Survey	·	1.6 km	MPC · JPL
301157	2008 YL_{19}	—	December 21, 2008	Mount Lemmon	Mount Lemmon Survey	MAS	650 m	MPC · JPL
301158	2008 YT_{21}	—	December 21, 2008	Mount Lemmon	Mount Lemmon Survey	·	2.2 km	MPC · JPL
301159	2008 YJ_{23}	—	December 20, 2008	La Sagra	OAM	·	1.2 km	MPC · JPL
301160	2008 YX_{29}	—	December 29, 2008	Taunus	Karge, S., R. Kling	·	1.5 km	MPC · JPL
301161	2008 YO_{33}	—	December 29, 2008	Dauban	Kugel, F.	ERI	1.8 km	MPC · JPL
301162	2008 YS_{34}	—	December 31, 2008	Bergisch Gladbach	W. Bickel	·	1.2 km	MPC · JPL
301163	2008 YZ_{36}	—	December 22, 2008	Kitt Peak	Spacewatch	NYS	1.5 km	MPC · JPL
301164	2008 YF_{41}	—	December 30, 2008	Catalina	CSS	V	920 m	MPC · JPL
301165	2008 YC_{50}	—	December 29, 2008	Mount Lemmon	Mount Lemmon Survey	·	1.2 km	MPC · JPL
301166	2008 YQ_{53}	—	December 29, 2008	Mount Lemmon	Mount Lemmon Survey	HNS	1.2 km	MPC · JPL
301167	2008 YR_{65}	—	December 30, 2008	Mount Lemmon	Mount Lemmon Survey	·	6.1 km	MPC · JPL
301168	2008 YT_{65}	—	December 30, 2008	Mount Lemmon	Mount Lemmon Survey	EOS	2.4 km	MPC · JPL
301169	2008 YQ_{67}	—	December 30, 2008	Mount Lemmon	Mount Lemmon Survey	·	2.4 km	MPC · JPL
301170	2008 YT_{70}	—	December 29, 2008	Mount Lemmon	Mount Lemmon Survey	·	2.0 km	MPC · JPL
301171	2008 YM_{78}	—	December 30, 2008	Mount Lemmon	Mount Lemmon Survey	NYS ·	2.5 km	MPC · JPL
301172	2008 YD_{89}	—	December 29, 2008	Kitt Peak	Spacewatch	·	1.7 km	MPC · JPL
301173	2008 YK_{97}	—	December 29, 2008	Mount Lemmon	Mount Lemmon Survey	AGN	1.7 km	MPC · JPL
301174	2008 YF_{103}	—	December 29, 2008	Kitt Peak	Spacewatch	·	1.3 km	MPC · JPL
301175	2008 YZ_{103}	—	December 29, 2008	Kitt Peak	Spacewatch	·	1.2 km	MPC · JPL
301176	2008 YX_{104}	—	December 29, 2008	Kitt Peak	Spacewatch	MAS	800 m	MPC · JPL
301177	2008 YZ_{104}	—	December 29, 2008	Kitt Peak	Spacewatch	·	1.7 km	MPC · JPL
301178	2008 YK_{117}	—	December 29, 2008	Kitt Peak	Spacewatch	·	1.1 km	MPC · JPL
301179	2008 YA_{128}	—	December 30, 2008	Kitt Peak	Spacewatch	·	1.5 km	MPC · JPL
301180	2008 YE_{129}	—	December 31, 2008	Kitt Peak	Spacewatch	·	1.5 km	MPC · JPL
301181	2008 YZ_{133}	—	December 30, 2008	Kitt Peak	Spacewatch	SUL	2.9 km	MPC · JPL
301182	2008 YF_{138}	—	December 30, 2008	Kitt Peak	Spacewatch	MAS	760 m	MPC · JPL
301183	2008 YH_{143}	—	December 30, 2008	Kitt Peak	Spacewatch	·	1.1 km	MPC · JPL
301184	2008 YW_{145}	—	December 30, 2008	Kitt Peak	Spacewatch	MAS	630 m	MPC · JPL
301185	2008 YY_{145}	—	December 30, 2008	Kitt Peak	Spacewatch	NYS	1.4 km	MPC · JPL
301186	2008 YJ_{146}	—	December 30, 2008	Kitt Peak	Spacewatch	·	2.0 km	MPC · JPL
301187	2008 YR_{147}	—	December 31, 2008	Kitt Peak	Spacewatch	·	1.6 km	MPC · JPL
301188	2008 YH_{152}	—	December 22, 2008	Kitt Peak	Spacewatch	AGN	1.5 km	MPC · JPL
301189	2008 YS_{152}	—	December 30, 2008	Mount Lemmon	Mount Lemmon Survey	(5)	1.7 km	MPC · JPL
301190	2008 YS_{159}	—	December 21, 2008	Mount Lemmon	Mount Lemmon Survey	MAS	870 m	MPC · JPL
301191	2008 YR_{161}	—	December 21, 2008	Mount Lemmon	Mount Lemmon Survey	·	1.6 km	MPC · JPL
301192	2008 YZ_{165}	—	December 29, 2008	Mount Lemmon	Mount Lemmon Survey	EUN	1.6 km	MPC · JPL
301193	2008 YW_{166}	—	December 21, 2008	Socorro	LINEAR	V	1.1 km	MPC · JPL
301194	2008 YH_{167}	—	December 21, 2008	Socorro	LINEAR	·	1.4 km	MPC · JPL
301195	2008 YM_{167}	—	December 21, 2008	Catalina	CSS	NYS	1.5 km	MPC · JPL
301196	2008 YO_{168}	—	December 31, 2008	Catalina	CSS	·	2.2 km	MPC · JPL
301197	2008 YR_{169}	—	December 30, 2008	Mount Lemmon	Mount Lemmon Survey	V	950 m	MPC · JPL
301198	2008 YR_{171}	—	December 31, 2008	Socorro	LINEAR	·	1.3 km	MPC · JPL
301199	2008 YA_{172}	—	December 30, 2008	Mount Lemmon	Mount Lemmon Survey	·	3.0 km	MPC · JPL
301200	2009 AH	—	January 1, 2009	Mayhill	Lowe, A.	GEF	1.5 km	MPC · JPL

== 301201–301300 ==
back to top

Designation			Discovery			Properties		Ref
Permanent	Provisional	Named after	Date	Site	Discoverer(s)	Category	Diam.	Ref
301201	2009 AO_{11}	—	January 2, 2009	Mount Lemmon	Mount Lemmon Survey	V	970 m	MPC · JPL
301202	2009 AZ_{22}	—	January 3, 2009	Kitt Peak	Spacewatch	·	790 m	MPC · JPL
301203	2009 AB_{24}	—	January 3, 2009	Kitt Peak	Spacewatch	MAR	1.2 km	MPC · JPL
301204	2009 AU_{27}	—	January 2, 2009	Kitt Peak	Spacewatch	(7744)	1.5 km	MPC · JPL
301205	2009 AC_{30}	—	November 20, 2001	Socorro	LINEAR	·	710 m	MPC · JPL
301206	2009 AC_{31}	—	January 15, 2009	Kitt Peak	Spacewatch	·	1.3 km	MPC · JPL
301207	2009 AQ_{34}	—	January 15, 2009	Kitt Peak	Spacewatch	·	1.2 km	MPC · JPL
301208	2009 AL_{41}	—	January 15, 2009	Kitt Peak	Spacewatch	·	1.5 km	MPC · JPL
301209	2009 AU_{42}	—	January 2, 2009	Mount Lemmon	Mount Lemmon Survey	·	1.8 km	MPC · JPL
301210	2009 AB_{44}	—	January 3, 2009	Mount Lemmon	Mount Lemmon Survey	KOR	1.4 km	MPC · JPL
301211	2009 AC_{44}	—	January 3, 2009	Mount Lemmon	Mount Lemmon Survey	·	1.6 km	MPC · JPL
301212	2009 AG_{44}	—	January 3, 2009	Mount Lemmon	Mount Lemmon Survey	MRX	1.1 km	MPC · JPL
301213	2009 AP_{45}	—	January 2, 2009	Kitt Peak	Spacewatch	·	2.7 km	MPC · JPL
301214	2009 AU_{45}	—	January 1, 2009	Mount Lemmon	Mount Lemmon Survey	·	1.1 km	MPC · JPL
301215	2009 AL_{46}	—	January 15, 2009	Kitt Peak	Spacewatch	·	2.5 km	MPC · JPL
301216	2009 AK_{48}	—	January 2, 2009	Mount Lemmon	Mount Lemmon Survey	·	1.4 km	MPC · JPL
301217	2009 AQ_{49}	—	January 1, 2009	Kitt Peak	Spacewatch	·	1.1 km	MPC · JPL
301218	2009 AP_{50}	—	January 3, 2009	Catalina	CSS	PHO	3.9 km	MPC · JPL
301219	2009 BP_{2}	—	January 18, 2009	Weihai	University, Shandong	·	1.2 km	MPC · JPL
301220	2009 BK_{4}	—	January 18, 2009	Socorro	LINEAR	·	1.7 km	MPC · JPL
301221	2009 BL_{5}	—	January 20, 2009	Tzec Maun	Tozzi, F.	·	2.0 km	MPC · JPL
301222	2009 BK_{6}	—	January 18, 2009	Socorro	LINEAR	·	1.7 km	MPC · JPL
301223	2009 BZ_{6}	—	January 18, 2009	Socorro	LINEAR	·	1.4 km	MPC · JPL
301224	2009 BX_{8}	—	January 17, 2009	Socorro	LINEAR	MAS	820 m	MPC · JPL
301225	2009 BD_{9}	—	January 17, 2009	Socorro	LINEAR	·	1.2 km	MPC · JPL
301226	2009 BW_{12}	—	January 21, 2009	Socorro	LINEAR	·	2.0 km	MPC · JPL
301227	2009 BL_{13}	—	January 22, 2009	Socorro	LINEAR	·	1.8 km	MPC · JPL
301228	2009 BN_{13}	—	January 22, 2009	Socorro	LINEAR	·	2.1 km	MPC · JPL
301229	2009 BS_{13}	—	January 26, 2009	Mayhill	Lowe, A.	·	1.5 km	MPC · JPL
301230	2009 BC_{19}	—	January 16, 2009	Mount Lemmon	Mount Lemmon Survey	MAS	770 m	MPC · JPL
301231	2009 BS_{19}	—	January 16, 2009	Mount Lemmon	Mount Lemmon Survey	AGN	1.2 km	MPC · JPL
301232	2009 BY_{24}	—	January 17, 2009	Kitt Peak	Spacewatch	NYS	1.3 km	MPC · JPL
301233	2009 BK_{25}	—	January 19, 2009	Mount Lemmon	Mount Lemmon Survey	·	1.4 km	MPC · JPL
301234	2009 BY_{26}	—	January 16, 2009	Kitt Peak	Spacewatch	(2076)	1.1 km	MPC · JPL
301235	2009 BE_{34}	—	January 16, 2009	Kitt Peak	Spacewatch	·	1.3 km	MPC · JPL
301236	2009 BJ_{37}	—	January 16, 2009	Kitt Peak	Spacewatch	NEM	2.4 km	MPC · JPL
301237	2009 BM_{40}	—	January 16, 2009	Kitt Peak	Spacewatch	·	1.5 km	MPC · JPL
301238	2009 BD_{42}	—	January 16, 2009	Kitt Peak	Spacewatch	T_{j} (2.98)	6.4 km	MPC · JPL
301239	2009 BH_{42}	—	January 16, 2009	Kitt Peak	Spacewatch	·	1.8 km	MPC · JPL
301240	2009 BE_{43}	—	January 16, 2009	Kitt Peak	Spacewatch	·	1.5 km	MPC · JPL
301241	2009 BO_{43}	—	January 16, 2009	Kitt Peak	Spacewatch	·	1.3 km	MPC · JPL
301242	2009 BS_{43}	—	January 16, 2009	Kitt Peak	Spacewatch	KOR	1.4 km	MPC · JPL
301243	2009 BF_{45}	—	January 16, 2009	Kitt Peak	Spacewatch	MAS	820 m	MPC · JPL
301244	2009 BJ_{45}	—	January 16, 2009	Kitt Peak	Spacewatch	KOR	1.6 km	MPC · JPL
301245	2009 BS_{45}	—	January 16, 2009	Kitt Peak	Spacewatch	HOF	2.3 km	MPC · JPL
301246	2009 BW_{45}	—	January 16, 2009	Kitt Peak	Spacewatch	·	1.9 km	MPC · JPL
301247	2009 BR_{46}	—	January 16, 2009	Kitt Peak	Spacewatch	NYS	1.2 km	MPC · JPL
301248	2009 BR_{47}	—	January 16, 2009	Mount Lemmon	Mount Lemmon Survey	AGN	1.2 km	MPC · JPL
301249	2009 BT_{48}	—	January 16, 2009	Kitt Peak	Spacewatch	·	1.3 km	MPC · JPL
301250	2009 BP_{49}	—	January 16, 2009	Mount Lemmon	Mount Lemmon Survey	·	3.0 km	MPC · JPL
301251	2009 BZ_{49}	—	January 16, 2009	Mount Lemmon	Mount Lemmon Survey	·	2.8 km	MPC · JPL
301252	2009 BO_{50}	—	January 16, 2009	Mount Lemmon	Mount Lemmon Survey	·	1.6 km	MPC · JPL
301253	2009 BR_{52}	—	January 16, 2009	Mount Lemmon	Mount Lemmon Survey	·	1.5 km	MPC · JPL
301254	2009 BW_{52}	—	January 16, 2009	Mount Lemmon	Mount Lemmon Survey	EUN	1.3 km	MPC · JPL
301255	2009 BH_{55}	—	January 16, 2009	Mount Lemmon	Mount Lemmon Survey	·	1.3 km	MPC · JPL
301256	2009 BW_{65}	—	January 20, 2009	Kitt Peak	Spacewatch	NEM	3.0 km	MPC · JPL
301257	2009 BN_{69}	—	January 25, 2009	Catalina	CSS	·	1.4 km	MPC · JPL
301258	2009 BP_{69}	—	January 25, 2009	Catalina	CSS	·	1.8 km	MPC · JPL
301259	2009 BK_{70}	—	January 25, 2009	Catalina	CSS	·	2.3 km	MPC · JPL
301260	2009 BH_{71}	—	January 26, 2009	Purple Mountain	PMO NEO Survey Program	JUN	1.8 km	MPC · JPL
301261	2009 BS_{71}	—	December 19, 2004	Mount Lemmon	Mount Lemmon Survey	·	1.3 km	MPC · JPL
301262	2009 BZ_{76}	—	January 28, 2009	Catalina	CSS	DOR	3.5 km	MPC · JPL
301263 Anitaheward	2009 BB_{77}	Anitaheward	January 30, 2009	Haleakala	Miles, R.	·	1.6 km	MPC · JPL
301264	2009 BO_{77}	—	January 25, 2009	Socorro	LINEAR	V	1.1 km	MPC · JPL
301265	2009 BG_{79}	—	January 29, 2009	Wildberg	R. Apitzsch	EUN	1.7 km	MPC · JPL
301266	2009 BN_{79}	—	January 30, 2009	Socorro	LINEAR	·	1.7 km	MPC · JPL
301267	2009 BZ_{81}	—	January 31, 2009	Socorro	LINEAR	·	3.4 km	MPC · JPL
301268	2009 BK_{83}	—	January 29, 2009	Pla D'Arguines	R. Ferrando	·	1.4 km	MPC · JPL
301269	2009 BT_{83}	—	January 31, 2009	Kitt Peak	Spacewatch	·	1.1 km	MPC · JPL
301270	2009 BX_{83}	—	January 31, 2009	Kitt Peak	Spacewatch	·	1.4 km	MPC · JPL
301271	2009 BB_{84}	—	January 31, 2009	Kitt Peak	Spacewatch	MAS	760 m	MPC · JPL
301272	2009 BR_{84}	—	January 25, 2009	Kitt Peak	Spacewatch	·	1.2 km	MPC · JPL
301273	2009 BJ_{86}	—	January 25, 2009	Kitt Peak	Spacewatch	MAS	630 m	MPC · JPL
301274	2009 BH_{89}	—	January 25, 2009	Kitt Peak	Spacewatch	·	1.5 km	MPC · JPL
301275	2009 BG_{90}	—	January 25, 2009	Kitt Peak	Spacewatch	MAS	760 m	MPC · JPL
301276	2009 BJ_{90}	—	January 25, 2009	Kitt Peak	Spacewatch	·	1.9 km	MPC · JPL
301277	2009 BW_{90}	—	January 25, 2009	Kitt Peak	Spacewatch	·	1.4 km	MPC · JPL
301278	2009 BF_{91}	—	January 25, 2009	Kitt Peak	Spacewatch	·	950 m	MPC · JPL
301279	2009 BH_{94}	—	January 25, 2009	Kitt Peak	Spacewatch	·	1.7 km	MPC · JPL
301280	2009 BS_{94}	—	January 25, 2009	Kitt Peak	Spacewatch	(5)	1.4 km	MPC · JPL
301281	2009 BM_{98}	—	January 26, 2009	Mount Lemmon	Mount Lemmon Survey	·	1.6 km	MPC · JPL
301282	2009 BT_{104}	—	January 25, 2009	Kitt Peak	Spacewatch	·	950 m	MPC · JPL
301283	2009 BA_{105}	—	January 25, 2009	Kitt Peak	Spacewatch	·	1.2 km	MPC · JPL
301284	2009 BF_{105}	—	January 25, 2009	Kitt Peak	Spacewatch	·	5.6 km	MPC · JPL
301285	2009 BZ_{107}	—	January 29, 2009	Mount Lemmon	Mount Lemmon Survey	EOS	2.2 km	MPC · JPL
301286	2009 BA_{108}	—	January 29, 2009	Mount Lemmon	Mount Lemmon Survey	·	2.4 km	MPC · JPL
301287	2009 BD_{108}	—	January 29, 2009	Mount Lemmon	Mount Lemmon Survey	·	2.1 km	MPC · JPL
301288	2009 BA_{110}	—	January 30, 2009	Bergisch Gladbach	W. Bickel	·	5.2 km	MPC · JPL
301289	2009 BR_{112}	—	January 31, 2009	Mount Lemmon	Mount Lemmon Survey	·	3.9 km	MPC · JPL
301290	2009 BG_{113}	—	February 3, 2009	Mount Lemmon	Mount Lemmon Survey	·	3.8 km	MPC · JPL
301291	2009 BW_{113}	—	January 26, 2009	Mount Lemmon	Mount Lemmon Survey	·	1.4 km	MPC · JPL
301292	2009 BK_{120}	—	January 31, 2009	Kitt Peak	Spacewatch	·	2.2 km	MPC · JPL
301293	2009 BS_{123}	—	January 31, 2009	Kitt Peak	Spacewatch	·	3.3 km	MPC · JPL
301294	2009 BW_{123}	—	January 31, 2009	Kitt Peak	Spacewatch	EOS	2.4 km	MPC · JPL
301295	2009 BY_{123}	—	January 31, 2009	Kitt Peak	Spacewatch	·	2.2 km	MPC · JPL
301296	2009 BJ_{124}	—	January 31, 2009	Kitt Peak	Spacewatch	·	2.4 km	MPC · JPL
301297	2009 BV_{124}	—	January 31, 2009	Kitt Peak	Spacewatch	EOS	2.4 km	MPC · JPL
301298	2009 BP_{125}	—	January 28, 2009	Kitt Peak	Spacewatch	·	3.6 km	MPC · JPL
301299	2009 BP_{127}	—	January 29, 2009	Kitt Peak	Spacewatch	WIT	1.2 km	MPC · JPL
301300	2009 BC_{129}	—	January 30, 2009	Kitt Peak	Spacewatch	HOF	3.4 km	MPC · JPL

== 301301–301400 ==
back to top

Designation			Discovery			Properties		Ref
Permanent	Provisional	Named after	Date	Site	Discoverer(s)	Category	Diam.	Ref
301301	2009 BL_{130}	—	January 31, 2009	Mount Lemmon	Mount Lemmon Survey	(43176)	4.6 km	MPC · JPL
301302	2009 BX_{130}	—	January 31, 2009	Mount Lemmon	Mount Lemmon Survey	·	1.2 km	MPC · JPL
301303	2009 BL_{131}	—	January 31, 2009	Mount Lemmon	Mount Lemmon Survey	·	2.3 km	MPC · JPL
301304	2009 BH_{133}	—	January 29, 2009	Kitt Peak	Spacewatch	·	2.0 km	MPC · JPL
301305	2009 BU_{133}	—	January 29, 2009	Kitt Peak	Spacewatch	(12739)	1.5 km	MPC · JPL
301306	2009 BF_{134}	—	January 29, 2009	Kitt Peak	Spacewatch	·	1.3 km	MPC · JPL
301307	2009 BQ_{134}	—	January 29, 2009	Kitt Peak	Spacewatch	·	1.5 km	MPC · JPL
301308	2009 BB_{140}	—	January 29, 2009	Kitt Peak	Spacewatch	·	1.3 km	MPC · JPL
301309	2009 BR_{142}	—	January 30, 2009	Mount Lemmon	Mount Lemmon Survey	·	1.1 km	MPC · JPL
301310	2009 BT_{142}	—	January 30, 2009	Kitt Peak	Spacewatch	(17392)	2.0 km	MPC · JPL
301311	2009 BM_{146}	—	January 30, 2009	Mount Lemmon	Mount Lemmon Survey	(5)	1.2 km	MPC · JPL
301312	2009 BC_{147}	—	December 18, 2004	Mount Lemmon	Mount Lemmon Survey	·	1.4 km	MPC · JPL
301313	2009 BP_{148}	—	January 30, 2009	Mount Lemmon	Mount Lemmon Survey	AGN	1.4 km	MPC · JPL
301314	2009 BO_{149}	—	January 31, 2009	Mount Lemmon	Mount Lemmon Survey	NYS	1.3 km	MPC · JPL
301315	2009 BS_{149}	—	January 31, 2009	Kitt Peak	Spacewatch	MAS	860 m	MPC · JPL
301316	2009 BR_{150}	—	January 27, 2009	Purple Mountain	PMO NEO Survey Program	·	2.3 km	MPC · JPL
301317	2009 BO_{153}	—	January 31, 2009	Kitt Peak	Spacewatch	·	1.5 km	MPC · JPL
301318	2009 BK_{155}	—	January 31, 2009	Kitt Peak	Spacewatch	·	4.7 km	MPC · JPL
301319	2009 BR_{157}	—	January 31, 2009	Kitt Peak	Spacewatch	EOS	3.7 km	MPC · JPL
301320	2009 BM_{158}	—	January 31, 2009	Kitt Peak	Spacewatch	·	1.0 km	MPC · JPL
301321	2009 BP_{162}	—	January 30, 2009	Mount Lemmon	Mount Lemmon Survey	·	4.4 km	MPC · JPL
301322	2009 BL_{167}	—	January 24, 2009	Cerro Burek	Burek, Cerro	·	1.5 km	MPC · JPL
301323	2009 BC_{168}	—	January 24, 2009	Cerro Burek	Burek, Cerro	EOS	4.3 km	MPC · JPL
301324	2009 BQ_{169}	—	January 16, 2009	Kitt Peak	Spacewatch	·	1.6 km	MPC · JPL
301325	2009 BV_{171}	—	January 17, 2009	Kitt Peak	Spacewatch	·	1.5 km	MPC · JPL
301326	2009 BB_{173}	—	January 20, 2009	Mount Lemmon	Mount Lemmon Survey	·	930 m	MPC · JPL
301327	2009 BP_{173}	—	January 20, 2009	Catalina	CSS	·	2.4 km	MPC · JPL
301328	2009 BG_{176}	—	January 31, 2009	Mount Lemmon	Mount Lemmon Survey	·	2.9 km	MPC · JPL
301329	2009 BL_{176}	—	January 31, 2009	Kitt Peak	Spacewatch	·	2.2 km	MPC · JPL
301330	2009 BR_{178}	—	January 25, 2009	Kitt Peak	Spacewatch	·	2.0 km	MPC · JPL
301331	2009 BV_{178}	—	January 30, 2009	Mount Lemmon	Mount Lemmon Survey	·	3.7 km	MPC · JPL
301332	2009 BC_{179}	—	January 30, 2009	Mount Lemmon	Mount Lemmon Survey	·	2.0 km	MPC · JPL
301333	2009 BX_{180}	—	January 31, 2009	Kitt Peak	Spacewatch	·	3.1 km	MPC · JPL
301334	2009 BY_{181}	—	January 31, 2009	Mount Lemmon	Mount Lemmon Survey	·	1.2 km	MPC · JPL
301335	2009 BK_{183}	—	January 25, 2009	Kitt Peak	Spacewatch	·	980 m	MPC · JPL
301336	2009 BL_{183}	—	January 25, 2009	Kitt Peak	Spacewatch	KOR	1.4 km	MPC · JPL
301337	2009 BA_{185}	—	January 20, 2009	Socorro	LINEAR	·	2.4 km	MPC · JPL
301338	2009 BR_{186}	—	January 20, 2009	Socorro	LINEAR	·	3.8 km	MPC · JPL
301339	2009 BD_{187}	—	January 26, 2009	Socorro	LINEAR	·	4.0 km	MPC · JPL
301340	2009 BP_{187}	—	January 31, 2009	Kitt Peak	Spacewatch	·	2.6 km	MPC · JPL
301341	2009 BC_{188}	—	January 23, 2009	Purple Mountain	PMO NEO Survey Program	·	1.3 km	MPC · JPL
301342	2009 BK_{188}	—	January 25, 2009	Kitt Peak	Spacewatch	AGN	1.5 km	MPC · JPL
301343	2009 BM_{188}	—	January 25, 2009	Catalina	CSS	·	2.6 km	MPC · JPL
301344	2009 BC_{189}	—	January 25, 2009	Catalina	CSS	·	2.2 km	MPC · JPL
301345	2009 CU_{3}	—	February 1, 2009	Great Shefford	Birtwhistle, P.	KON	2.5 km	MPC · JPL
301346	2009 CS_{7}	—	February 1, 2009	Mount Lemmon	Mount Lemmon Survey	·	820 m	MPC · JPL
301347	2009 CB_{8}	—	February 1, 2009	Mount Lemmon	Mount Lemmon Survey	NYS	930 m	MPC · JPL
301348	2009 CE_{9}	—	February 1, 2009	Mount Lemmon	Mount Lemmon Survey	V	770 m	MPC · JPL
301349	2009 CO_{10}	—	February 1, 2009	Mount Lemmon	Mount Lemmon Survey	·	3.2 km	MPC · JPL
301350	2009 CE_{12}	—	February 1, 2009	Kitt Peak	Spacewatch	·	1.8 km	MPC · JPL
301351	2009 CR_{14}	—	February 1, 2009	Kitt Peak	Spacewatch	·	2.3 km	MPC · JPL
301352	2009 CL_{16}	—	February 1, 2009	Mount Lemmon	Mount Lemmon Survey	·	1.9 km	MPC · JPL
301353	2009 CP_{22}	—	February 1, 2009	Kitt Peak	Spacewatch	·	1.0 km	MPC · JPL
301354	2009 CG_{28}	—	February 1, 2009	Kitt Peak	Spacewatch	·	2.0 km	MPC · JPL
301355	2009 CQ_{28}	—	February 1, 2009	Kitt Peak	Spacewatch	·	1.8 km	MPC · JPL
301356	2009 CM_{31}	—	February 1, 2009	Kitt Peak	Spacewatch	·	1.5 km	MPC · JPL
301357	2009 CV_{31}	—	February 1, 2009	Kitt Peak	Spacewatch	NYS	1.4 km	MPC · JPL
301358	2009 CC_{37}	—	February 4, 2009	Mount Lemmon	Mount Lemmon Survey	·	1.4 km	MPC · JPL
301359	2009 CA_{39}	—	February 13, 2009	Kitt Peak	Spacewatch	·	2.0 km	MPC · JPL
301360	2009 CE_{39}	—	February 13, 2009	Kitt Peak	Spacewatch	·	2.5 km	MPC · JPL
301361	2009 CJ_{39}	—	February 13, 2009	Kitt Peak	Spacewatch	·	1.6 km	MPC · JPL
301362	2009 CD_{43}	—	February 14, 2009	Catalina	CSS	ADE	2.9 km	MPC · JPL
301363	2009 CS_{43}	—	February 14, 2009	Kitt Peak	Spacewatch	·	2.5 km	MPC · JPL
301364	2009 CA_{44}	—	February 14, 2009	Kitt Peak	Spacewatch	·	3.4 km	MPC · JPL
301365	2009 CS_{44}	—	February 14, 2009	Kitt Peak	Spacewatch	·	3.9 km	MPC · JPL
301366	2009 CX_{44}	—	February 14, 2009	Mount Lemmon	Mount Lemmon Survey	·	1.9 km	MPC · JPL
301367	2009 CP_{49}	—	February 14, 2009	Mount Lemmon	Mount Lemmon Survey	EUP	6.2 km	MPC · JPL
301368	2009 CX_{49}	—	February 14, 2009	La Sagra	OAM	·	2.8 km	MPC · JPL
301369	2009 CF_{51}	—	February 14, 2009	La Sagra	OAM	·	1.5 km	MPC · JPL
301370	2009 CX_{52}	—	February 14, 2009	Mount Lemmon	Mount Lemmon Survey	KOR	1.8 km	MPC · JPL
301371	2009 CC_{54}	—	February 13, 2009	Kitt Peak	Spacewatch	·	1.6 km	MPC · JPL
301372	2009 CW_{54}	—	February 14, 2009	Mount Lemmon	Mount Lemmon Survey	·	1.2 km	MPC · JPL
301373	2009 CK_{55}	—	February 14, 2009	Mount Lemmon	Mount Lemmon Survey	·	1.2 km	MPC · JPL
301374	2009 CE_{56}	—	February 1, 2009	Catalina	CSS	·	1.8 km	MPC · JPL
301375	2009 CJ_{59}	—	February 14, 2009	Kitt Peak	Spacewatch	·	2.9 km	MPC · JPL
301376	2009 CJ_{62}	—	February 3, 2009	Kitt Peak	Spacewatch	·	2.4 km	MPC · JPL
301377	2009 CP_{62}	—	February 5, 2009	Kitt Peak	Spacewatch	·	3.5 km	MPC · JPL
301378	2009 CZ_{62}	—	February 2, 2009	Kitt Peak	Spacewatch	·	4.2 km	MPC · JPL
301379	2009 CJ_{63}	—	February 1, 2009	Catalina	CSS	·	2.7 km	MPC · JPL
301380	2009 CW_{64}	—	February 5, 2009	Kitt Peak	Spacewatch	·	2.2 km	MPC · JPL
301381	2009 DR_{2}	—	February 17, 2009	Dauban	Kugel, F.	·	2.1 km	MPC · JPL
301382	2009 DX_{3}	—	February 18, 2009	Socorro	LINEAR	·	2.7 km	MPC · JPL
301383	2009 DL_{7}	—	February 19, 2009	Kitt Peak	Spacewatch	·	2.7 km	MPC · JPL
301384	2009 DV_{7}	—	February 19, 2009	Catalina	CSS	·	2.3 km	MPC · JPL
301385	2009 DR_{11}	—	February 21, 2009	Mayhill	Lowe, A.	·	1.6 km	MPC · JPL
301386	2009 DO_{14}	—	February 19, 2009	Mount Lemmon	Mount Lemmon Survey	·	2.2 km	MPC · JPL
301387	2009 DL_{19}	—	February 20, 2009	Kitt Peak	Spacewatch	AGN	1.1 km	MPC · JPL
301388	2009 DP_{19}	—	February 21, 2009	Catalina	CSS	(5)	1.6 km	MPC · JPL
301389	2009 DR_{19}	—	February 21, 2009	Catalina	CSS	·	1.8 km	MPC · JPL
301390	2009 DA_{20}	—	February 5, 2009	Kitt Peak	Spacewatch	·	1.6 km	MPC · JPL
301391	2009 DP_{24}	—	February 21, 2009	Kitt Peak	Spacewatch	KOR	1.8 km	MPC · JPL
301392	2009 DT_{25}	—	February 21, 2009	Mount Lemmon	Mount Lemmon Survey	·	1.7 km	MPC · JPL
301393	2009 DB_{29}	—	February 23, 2009	Calar Alto	F. Hormuth	KOR	1.6 km	MPC · JPL
301394 Bensheim	2009 DB_{31}	Bensheim	February 23, 2009	Tzec Maun	E. Schwab	·	3.1 km	MPC · JPL
301395	2009 DL_{31}	—	February 19, 2009	Kitt Peak	Spacewatch	·	1.8 km	MPC · JPL
301396	2009 DO_{31}	—	February 20, 2009	Kitt Peak	Spacewatch	·	2.2 km	MPC · JPL
301397	2009 DP_{31}	—	February 20, 2009	Kitt Peak	Spacewatch	(5)	1.6 km	MPC · JPL
301398	2009 DF_{32}	—	February 20, 2009	Kitt Peak	Spacewatch	·	2.5 km	MPC · JPL
301399	2009 DR_{32}	—	February 20, 2009	Kitt Peak	Spacewatch	·	2.4 km	MPC · JPL
301400	2009 DV_{32}	—	February 20, 2009	Kitt Peak	Spacewatch	KOR	1.7 km	MPC · JPL

== 301401–301500 ==
back to top

Designation			Discovery			Properties		Ref
Permanent	Provisional	Named after	Date	Site	Discoverer(s)	Category	Diam.	Ref
301401	2009 DD_{33}	—	February 20, 2009	Kitt Peak	Spacewatch	·	2.8 km	MPC · JPL
301402	2009 DC_{35}	—	February 20, 2009	Kitt Peak	Spacewatch	·	2.5 km	MPC · JPL
301403	2009 DE_{35}	—	February 20, 2009	Kitt Peak	Spacewatch	KOR	1.6 km	MPC · JPL
301404	2009 DK_{35}	—	February 20, 2009	Kitt Peak	Spacewatch	EOS	2.2 km	MPC · JPL
301405	2009 DE_{37}	—	February 23, 2009	Calar Alto	F. Hormuth	·	1.3 km	MPC · JPL
301406	2009 DT_{39}	—	February 19, 2009	Dauban	Kugel, F.	V	640 m	MPC · JPL
301407	2009 DD_{41}	—	February 17, 2009	La Sagra	OAM	EOS	2.5 km	MPC · JPL
301408	2009 DU_{41}	—	February 19, 2009	La Sagra	OAM	·	4.1 km	MPC · JPL
301409	2009 DB_{42}	—	February 19, 2009	La Sagra	OAM	EOS	2.5 km	MPC · JPL
301410	2009 DC_{42}	—	February 19, 2009	La Sagra	OAM	·	1.3 km	MPC · JPL
301411	2009 DQ_{45}	—	February 22, 2009	Socorro	LINEAR	·	1.6 km	MPC · JPL
301412	2009 DF_{46}	—	February 28, 2009	Wildberg	R. Apitzsch	PHO	1.5 km	MPC · JPL
301413 Rogerfux	2009 DN_{46}	Rogerfux	February 27, 2009	Vicques	M. Ory	AGN	1.4 km	MPC · JPL
301414	2009 DR_{46}	—	February 26, 2009	Socorro	LINEAR	·	2.2 km	MPC · JPL
301415	2009 DV_{48}	—	February 19, 2009	Kitt Peak	Spacewatch	·	1.5 km	MPC · JPL
301416	2009 DR_{49}	—	February 19, 2009	Kitt Peak	Spacewatch	·	2.9 km	MPC · JPL
301417	2009 DS_{49}	—	February 19, 2009	Kitt Peak	Spacewatch	AEO	1.2 km	MPC · JPL
301418	2009 DX_{50}	—	February 19, 2009	Kitt Peak	Spacewatch	HOF	2.9 km	MPC · JPL
301419	2009 DY_{50}	—	February 19, 2009	Kitt Peak	Spacewatch	·	1.6 km	MPC · JPL
301420	2009 DC_{51}	—	February 20, 2009	Kitt Peak	Spacewatch	·	2.8 km	MPC · JPL
301421	2009 DC_{55}	—	February 22, 2009	Kitt Peak	Spacewatch	·	3.2 km	MPC · JPL
301422	2009 DO_{56}	—	February 22, 2009	Kitt Peak	Spacewatch	·	2.1 km	MPC · JPL
301423	2009 DZ_{56}	—	February 22, 2009	Kitt Peak	Spacewatch	·	1.5 km	MPC · JPL
301424	2009 DG_{57}	—	February 22, 2009	Kitt Peak	Spacewatch	HYG	3.5 km	MPC · JPL
301425	2009 DT_{57}	—	February 22, 2009	Kitt Peak	Spacewatch	HOF	3.2 km	MPC · JPL
301426	2009 DX_{58}	—	February 22, 2009	Kitt Peak	Spacewatch	KOR	1.9 km	MPC · JPL
301427	2009 DZ_{59}	—	February 22, 2009	Kitt Peak	Spacewatch	HOF	3.5 km	MPC · JPL
301428	2009 DA_{61}	—	February 22, 2009	Kitt Peak	Spacewatch	·	2.0 km	MPC · JPL
301429	2009 DQ_{61}	—	February 22, 2009	Kitt Peak	Spacewatch	(5)	1.2 km	MPC · JPL
301430	2009 DX_{61}	—	February 22, 2009	Kitt Peak	Spacewatch	(5)	1.5 km	MPC · JPL
301431	2009 DL_{63}	—	February 22, 2009	Mount Lemmon	Mount Lemmon Survey	·	1.9 km	MPC · JPL
301432	2009 DO_{63}	—	February 22, 2009	Kitt Peak	Spacewatch	EOS	2.5 km	MPC · JPL
301433	2009 DP_{69}	—	February 26, 2009	Catalina	CSS	·	2.3 km	MPC · JPL
301434	2009 DK_{72}	—	February 22, 2009	Kitt Peak	Spacewatch	·	1.5 km	MPC · JPL
301435	2009 DE_{73}	—	February 25, 2009	Calar Alto	F. Hormuth	·	1.1 km	MPC · JPL
301436	2009 DL_{74}	—	February 26, 2009	Catalina	CSS	·	1.7 km	MPC · JPL
301437	2009 DO_{74}	—	February 26, 2009	Catalina	CSS	·	1.3 km	MPC · JPL
301438	2009 DF_{77}	—	February 21, 2009	La Sagra	OAM	EUP	5.9 km	MPC · JPL
301439	2009 DD_{78}	—	February 25, 2009	Catalina	CSS	PAD	2.2 km	MPC · JPL
301440	2009 DY_{79}	—	August 21, 2006	Kitt Peak	Spacewatch	KOR	1.8 km	MPC · JPL
301441	2009 DD_{80}	—	February 21, 2009	Kitt Peak	Spacewatch	·	3.4 km	MPC · JPL
301442	2009 DB_{81}	—	February 24, 2009	Kitt Peak	Spacewatch	·	2.6 km	MPC · JPL
301443	2009 DD_{82}	—	February 24, 2009	Kitt Peak	Spacewatch	AGN · fast	1.5 km	MPC · JPL
301444	2009 DM_{82}	—	February 24, 2009	Kitt Peak	Spacewatch	·	3.2 km	MPC · JPL
301445	2009 DT_{82}	—	February 24, 2009	Kitt Peak	Spacewatch	·	2.4 km	MPC · JPL
301446	2009 DX_{82}	—	February 24, 2009	Kitt Peak	Spacewatch	·	2.4 km	MPC · JPL
301447	2009 DH_{83}	—	February 24, 2009	Kitt Peak	Spacewatch	·	2.3 km	MPC · JPL
301448	2009 DA_{88}	—	February 27, 2009	Kitt Peak	Spacewatch	·	1.8 km	MPC · JPL
301449	2009 DB_{92}	—	February 27, 2009	Kitt Peak	Spacewatch	·	1.4 km	MPC · JPL
301450	2009 DZ_{94}	—	February 28, 2009	Kitt Peak	Spacewatch	·	2.4 km	MPC · JPL
301451	2009 DN_{98}	—	February 26, 2009	Kitt Peak	Spacewatch	·	1.1 km	MPC · JPL
301452	2009 DK_{102}	—	February 26, 2009	Kitt Peak	Spacewatch	·	3.1 km	MPC · JPL
301453	2009 DG_{112}	—	February 26, 2009	Kitt Peak	Spacewatch	KOR	1.7 km	MPC · JPL
301454	2009 DM_{112}	—	February 26, 2009	Catalina	CSS	·	1.2 km	MPC · JPL
301455	2009 DW_{112}	—	February 27, 2009	Catalina	CSS	·	4.0 km	MPC · JPL
301456	2009 DY_{112}	—	February 27, 2009	Catalina	CSS	HOF	2.8 km	MPC · JPL
301457	2009 DW_{113}	—	February 27, 2009	Mount Lemmon	Mount Lemmon Survey	·	1.5 km	MPC · JPL
301458	2009 DE_{115}	—	February 26, 2009	Catalina	CSS	HOF	2.8 km	MPC · JPL
301459	2009 DB_{116}	—	February 27, 2009	Kitt Peak	Spacewatch	(12739)	1.6 km	MPC · JPL
301460	2009 DB_{117}	—	February 27, 2009	Kitt Peak	Spacewatch	·	2.7 km	MPC · JPL
301461	2009 DX_{117}	—	February 27, 2009	Kitt Peak	Spacewatch	·	1.8 km	MPC · JPL
301462	2009 DL_{118}	—	February 27, 2009	Kitt Peak	Spacewatch	·	2.7 km	MPC · JPL
301463	2009 DX_{120}	—	February 27, 2009	Kitt Peak	Spacewatch	AGN	1.2 km	MPC · JPL
301464	2009 DY_{120}	—	February 27, 2009	Kitt Peak	Spacewatch	AST	2.0 km	MPC · JPL
301465	2009 DC_{122}	—	February 27, 2009	Kitt Peak	Spacewatch	·	1.6 km	MPC · JPL
301466	2009 DG_{124}	—	February 19, 2009	Catalina	CSS	·	2.3 km	MPC · JPL
301467	2009 DV_{125}	—	February 19, 2009	Kitt Peak	Spacewatch	·	3.2 km	MPC · JPL
301468	2009 DA_{126}	—	February 19, 2009	Kitt Peak	Spacewatch	(5)	1.8 km	MPC · JPL
301469	2009 DD_{126}	—	February 19, 2009	Kitt Peak	Spacewatch	·	1.9 km	MPC · JPL
301470	2009 DN_{126}	—	February 20, 2009	Kitt Peak	Spacewatch	·	1.5 km	MPC · JPL
301471	2009 DQ_{126}	—	February 20, 2009	Kitt Peak	Spacewatch	AGN	1.4 km	MPC · JPL
301472	2009 DW_{126}	—	February 20, 2009	Kitt Peak	Spacewatch	·	2.9 km	MPC · JPL
301473	2009 DQ_{127}	—	February 20, 2009	Kitt Peak	Spacewatch	·	1.9 km	MPC · JPL
301474	2009 DD_{128}	—	February 21, 2009	Kitt Peak	Spacewatch	·	2.5 km	MPC · JPL
301475	2009 DO_{128}	—	February 22, 2009	Catalina	CSS	·	4.7 km	MPC · JPL
301476	2009 DR_{128}	—	February 24, 2009	Catalina	CSS	ADE	3.2 km	MPC · JPL
301477	2009 DT_{128}	—	February 24, 2009	Catalina	CSS	·	2.3 km	MPC · JPL
301478	2009 DL_{131}	—	February 19, 2009	Kitt Peak	Spacewatch	·	1.6 km	MPC · JPL
301479	2009 DF_{132}	—	February 21, 2009	Kitt Peak	Spacewatch	EOS	3.5 km	MPC · JPL
301480	2009 DH_{133}	—	February 27, 2009	Kitt Peak	Spacewatch	AGN	1.4 km	MPC · JPL
301481	2009 DZ_{133}	—	February 28, 2009	Kitt Peak	Spacewatch	·	2.5 km	MPC · JPL
301482	2009 DL_{134}	—	February 28, 2009	Kitt Peak	Spacewatch	·	1.8 km	MPC · JPL
301483	2009 DB_{135}	—	February 20, 2009	Kitt Peak	Spacewatch	·	3.0 km	MPC · JPL
301484	2009 DV_{136}	—	February 24, 2009	Mount Lemmon	Mount Lemmon Survey	·	3.2 km	MPC · JPL
301485	2009 DU_{137}	—	February 19, 2009	Kitt Peak	Spacewatch	·	2.2 km	MPC · JPL
301486	2009 DB_{139}	—	February 26, 2009	Kitt Peak	Spacewatch	·	3.6 km	MPC · JPL
301487	2009 DW_{139}	—	February 16, 2009	Catalina	CSS	·	2.1 km	MPC · JPL
301488	2009 DO_{140}	—	February 21, 2009	Socorro	LINEAR	·	2.1 km	MPC · JPL
301489	2009 DW_{141}	—	February 18, 2009	Socorro	LINEAR	·	2.1 km	MPC · JPL
301490	2009 DE_{142}	—	February 25, 2009	Siding Spring	SSS	·	4.6 km	MPC · JPL
301491	2009 EP_{3}	—	March 14, 2009	La Sagra	OAM	V	1.1 km	MPC · JPL
301492	2009 EH_{4}	—	March 15, 2009	La Sagra	OAM	·	2.6 km	MPC · JPL
301493	2009 ES_{4}	—	March 15, 2009	La Sagra	OAM	(13314)	2.3 km	MPC · JPL
301494	2009 EG_{14}	—	March 15, 2009	Kitt Peak	Spacewatch	·	1.9 km	MPC · JPL
301495	2009 EK_{15}	—	March 15, 2009	Kitt Peak	Spacewatch	·	1.9 km	MPC · JPL
301496	2009 EC_{18}	—	March 15, 2009	Kitt Peak	Spacewatch	AGN	1.6 km	MPC · JPL
301497	2009 EB_{19}	—	March 15, 2009	Mount Lemmon	Mount Lemmon Survey	·	2.1 km	MPC · JPL
301498	2009 ET_{19}	—	March 15, 2009	Catalina	CSS	·	2.1 km	MPC · JPL
301499	2009 EX_{21}	—	March 14, 2009	La Sagra	OAM	·	2.3 km	MPC · JPL
301500	2009 EL_{22}	—	March 2, 2009	Kitt Peak	Spacewatch	KOR	1.7 km	MPC · JPL

== 301501–301600 ==
back to top

Designation			Discovery			Properties		Ref
Permanent	Provisional	Named after	Date	Site	Discoverer(s)	Category	Diam.	Ref
301501	2009 EQ_{22}	—	March 2, 2009	Mount Lemmon	Mount Lemmon Survey	·	3.2 km	MPC · JPL
301502	2009 EY_{22}	—	March 3, 2009	Mount Lemmon	Mount Lemmon Survey	EOS	2.9 km	MPC · JPL
301503	2009 EP_{23}	—	March 3, 2009	Catalina	CSS	·	3.9 km	MPC · JPL
301504	2009 ED_{26}	—	March 8, 2009	Mount Lemmon	Mount Lemmon Survey	·	4.5 km	MPC · JPL
301505	2009 EE_{26}	—	March 8, 2009	Mount Lemmon	Mount Lemmon Survey	HYG	3.1 km	MPC · JPL
301506	2009 ES_{28}	—	March 3, 2009	Mount Lemmon	Mount Lemmon Survey	THM	3.1 km	MPC · JPL
301507	2009 EX_{28}	—	March 15, 2009	La Sagra	OAM	·	1.5 km	MPC · JPL
301508	2009 EC_{30}	—	March 1, 2009	Mount Lemmon	Mount Lemmon Survey	·	3.8 km	MPC · JPL
301509	2009 EW_{30}	—	March 1, 2009	Kitt Peak	Spacewatch	·	2.8 km	MPC · JPL
301510	2009 FY_{2}	—	March 18, 2009	Dauban	Kugel, F.	EOS	2.5 km	MPC · JPL
301511 Hubinon	2009 FJ_{5}	Hubinon	March 19, 2009	Saint-Sulpice	B. Christophe	·	3.2 km	MPC · JPL
301512	2009 FY_{6}	—	March 16, 2009	Kitt Peak	Spacewatch	·	3.1 km	MPC · JPL
301513	2009 FU_{7}	—	March 16, 2009	Kitt Peak	Spacewatch	·	3.3 km	MPC · JPL
301514	2009 FQ_{8}	—	March 16, 2009	Kitt Peak	Spacewatch	·	2.8 km	MPC · JPL
301515	2009 FL_{10}	—	March 18, 2009	Mount Lemmon	Mount Lemmon Survey	·	2.0 km	MPC · JPL
301516	2009 FF_{11}	—	March 17, 2009	Kitt Peak	Spacewatch	(12739)	1.8 km	MPC · JPL
301517	2009 FU_{13}	—	March 16, 2009	Dauban	Kugel, F.	·	1.9 km	MPC · JPL
301518	2009 FC_{18}	—	March 18, 2009	La Sagra	OAM	HOF	3.4 km	MPC · JPL
301519	2009 FF_{18}	—	March 19, 2009	La Sagra	OAM	·	4.9 km	MPC · JPL
301520	2009 FR_{19}	—	March 21, 2009	Dauban	Kugel, F.	·	3.5 km	MPC · JPL
301521	2009 FK_{22}	—	March 18, 2009	Siding Spring	SSS	·	5.4 km	MPC · JPL
301522 Chaykin	2009 FX_{23}	Chaykin	March 22, 2009	Tzec Maun	L. Elenin	·	3.5 km	MPC · JPL
301523	2009 FZ_{23}	—	March 18, 2009	La Sagra	OAM	·	2.9 km	MPC · JPL
301524	2009 FR_{26}	—	March 17, 2009	Kitt Peak	Spacewatch	·	1.1 km	MPC · JPL
301525	2009 FP_{27}	—	March 21, 2009	Mount Lemmon	Mount Lemmon Survey	KOR	1.6 km	MPC · JPL
301526	2009 FV_{28}	—	March 20, 2009	Bergisch Gladbach	W. Bickel	·	1.8 km	MPC · JPL
301527	2009 FY_{35}	—	March 25, 2009	Purple Mountain	PMO NEO Survey Program	·	1.8 km	MPC · JPL
301528	2009 FK_{37}	—	March 24, 2009	Mount Lemmon	Mount Lemmon Survey	(5)	1.6 km	MPC · JPL
301529	2009 FH_{38}	—	March 26, 2009	Kitt Peak	Spacewatch	RAF	880 m	MPC · JPL
301530	2009 FW_{38}	—	March 18, 2009	La Sagra	OAM	HOF	3.4 km	MPC · JPL
301531	2009 FE_{39}	—	March 23, 2009	Mount Lemmon	Mount Lemmon Survey	·	3.0 km	MPC · JPL
301532	2009 FN_{40}	—	March 16, 2009	Mount Lemmon	Mount Lemmon Survey	·	3.4 km	MPC · JPL
301533	2009 FY_{40}	—	March 20, 2009	La Sagra	OAM	(5)	1.1 km	MPC · JPL
301534	2009 FD_{44}	—	March 30, 2009	Bergisch Gladbach	W. Bickel	·	3.9 km	MPC · JPL
301535	2009 FE_{47}	—	March 28, 2009	Kitt Peak	Spacewatch	·	2.2 km	MPC · JPL
301536	2009 FO_{47}	—	March 28, 2009	Kitt Peak	Spacewatch	T_{j} (2.99)	5.8 km	MPC · JPL
301537	2009 FA_{48}	—	March 19, 2009	Mount Lemmon	Mount Lemmon Survey	·	3.8 km	MPC · JPL
301538	2009 FK_{50}	—	March 28, 2009	Kitt Peak	Spacewatch	·	2.8 km	MPC · JPL
301539	2009 FR_{53}	—	March 29, 2009	Mount Lemmon	Mount Lemmon Survey	·	2.4 km	MPC · JPL
301540	2009 FK_{54}	—	March 29, 2009	Mount Lemmon	Mount Lemmon Survey	·	6.0 km	MPC · JPL
301541	2009 FS_{60}	—	March 19, 2009	Mount Lemmon	Mount Lemmon Survey	·	3.2 km	MPC · JPL
301542	2009 FL_{62}	—	March 23, 2009	Purple Mountain	PMO NEO Survey Program	·	3.9 km	MPC · JPL
301543	2009 FY_{64}	—	March 17, 2009	Kitt Peak	Spacewatch	HYG	3.9 km	MPC · JPL
301544	2009 FY_{65}	—	March 19, 2009	Kitt Peak	Spacewatch	VER	3.2 km	MPC · JPL
301545	2009 FT_{71}	—	March 16, 2009	Kitt Peak	Spacewatch	KOR	1.8 km	MPC · JPL
301546	2009 FX_{71}	—	March 16, 2009	Kitt Peak	Spacewatch	URS	5.6 km	MPC · JPL
301547	2009 FQ_{73}	—	March 26, 2009	Kitt Peak	Spacewatch	EOS	1.7 km	MPC · JPL
301548	2009 FA_{74}	—	March 31, 2009	Kitt Peak	Spacewatch	·	1.5 km	MPC · JPL
301549	2009 FV_{75}	—	March 22, 2009	Mount Lemmon	Mount Lemmon Survey	AGN	1.9 km	MPC · JPL
301550	2009 FY_{76}	—	March 18, 2009	Kitt Peak	Spacewatch	VER	3.1 km	MPC · JPL
301551	2009 GD_{2}	—	April 5, 2009	La Sagra	OAM	·	3.7 km	MPC · JPL
301552 Alimenti	2009 GA_{3}	Alimenti	April 14, 2009	Vicques	M. Ory	AGN	1.7 km	MPC · JPL
301553 Ninaglebova	2009 GM_{3}	Ninaglebova	April 13, 2009	Zelenchukskaya Stn	T. V. Krjačko	·	3.5 km	MPC · JPL
301554	2009 GG_{4}	—	April 2, 2009	Mount Lemmon	Mount Lemmon Survey	·	3.6 km	MPC · JPL
301555	2009 HY	—	April 16, 2009	Catalina	CSS	·	5.3 km	MPC · JPL
301556	2009 HS_{1}	—	April 17, 2009	Catalina	CSS	EUN	1.5 km	MPC · JPL
301557	2009 HX_{2}	—	April 16, 2009	Catalina	CSS	·	1.9 km	MPC · JPL
301558	2009 HL_{3}	—	April 17, 2009	Kitt Peak	Spacewatch	EOS	2.3 km	MPC · JPL
301559	2009 HL_{9}	—	April 17, 2009	Mount Lemmon	Mount Lemmon Survey	·	3.9 km	MPC · JPL
301560	2009 HZ_{14}	—	April 18, 2009	Kitt Peak	Spacewatch	HYG	3.6 km	MPC · JPL
301561	2009 HU_{16}	—	April 18, 2009	Kitt Peak	Spacewatch	·	3.0 km	MPC · JPL
301562	2009 HO_{19}	—	April 19, 2009	Sierra Stars	Dillon, W. G.	·	2.5 km	MPC · JPL
301563	2009 HK_{25}	—	April 17, 2009	Kitt Peak	Spacewatch	ULA · CYB	7.1 km	MPC · JPL
301564	2009 HL_{32}	—	April 19, 2009	Kitt Peak	Spacewatch	·	4.4 km	MPC · JPL
301565	2009 HE_{33}	—	April 19, 2009	Mount Lemmon	Mount Lemmon Survey	·	3.1 km	MPC · JPL
301566 Melissajane	2009 HF_{36}	Melissajane	April 20, 2009	Mayhill	Falla, N.	·	2.0 km	MPC · JPL
301567	2009 HT_{36}	—	April 20, 2009	La Sagra	OAM	·	3.2 km	MPC · JPL
301568	2009 HU_{39}	—	April 18, 2009	Kitt Peak	Spacewatch	ULA · CYB	5.9 km	MPC · JPL
301569	2009 HY_{69}	—	April 22, 2009	Mount Lemmon	Mount Lemmon Survey	·	2.8 km	MPC · JPL
301570	2009 HA_{81}	—	April 29, 2009	Mount Lemmon	Mount Lemmon Survey	LIX	3.9 km	MPC · JPL
301571	2009 HJ_{82}	—	April 26, 2009	Socorro	LINEAR	·	4.3 km	MPC · JPL
301572	2009 HF_{96}	—	April 22, 2009	Kitt Peak	Spacewatch	TIR	3.4 km	MPC · JPL
301573	2009 HP_{99}	—	April 22, 2009	Mount Lemmon	Mount Lemmon Survey	HYG	3.4 km	MPC · JPL
301574	2009 JV_{15}	—	May 3, 2009	Kitt Peak	Spacewatch	·	3.4 km	MPC · JPL
301575	2009 KP_{3}	—	May 17, 2009	Kitt Peak	Spacewatch	EOS	2.8 km	MPC · JPL
301576	2009 KR_{9}	—	May 25, 2009	Kitt Peak	Spacewatch	·	3.0 km	MPC · JPL
301577	2009 KT_{17}	—	May 26, 2009	Kitt Peak	Spacewatch	SYL · CYB	5.9 km	MPC · JPL
301578	2009 RE_{2}	—	September 10, 2009	Hibiscus	Teamo, N.	·	2.1 km	MPC · JPL
301579	2009 UC_{87}	—	October 24, 2009	Catalina	CSS	L4	12 km	MPC · JPL
301580	2009 UT_{94}	—	October 21, 2009	Mount Lemmon	Mount Lemmon Survey	L4	11 km	MPC · JPL
301581	2009 XU_{9}	—	December 13, 2009	Socorro	LINEAR	H	1.1 km	MPC · JPL
301582	2010 AO_{105}	—	January 12, 2010	WISE	WISE	·	2.2 km	MPC · JPL
301583	2010 BR_{2}	—	January 19, 2010	Siding Spring	SSS	·	2.4 km	MPC · JPL
301584	2010 BN_{15}	—	April 9, 2010	Catalina	CSS	·	2.4 km	MPC · JPL
301585	2010 BV_{38}	—	January 19, 2010	WISE	WISE	ADE	2.6 km	MPC · JPL
301586	2010 BG_{50}	—	January 20, 2010	WISE	WISE	·	4.3 km	MPC · JPL
301587	2010 CB_{10}	—	February 8, 2010	WISE	WISE	·	5.3 km	MPC · JPL
301588	2010 CP_{16}	—	February 11, 2010	WISE	WISE	·	5.3 km	MPC · JPL
301589	2010 CS_{28}	—	February 9, 2010	Kitt Peak	Spacewatch	·	1.5 km	MPC · JPL
301590	2010 CB_{29}	—	February 9, 2010	Kitt Peak	Spacewatch	NYS	1.5 km	MPC · JPL
301591	2010 CW_{33}	—	February 10, 2010	Kitt Peak	Spacewatch	·	810 m	MPC · JPL
301592	2010 CG_{47}	—	March 4, 2005	Kitt Peak	Spacewatch	·	3.2 km	MPC · JPL
301593	2010 CH_{58}	—	February 12, 2010	Socorro	LINEAR	·	2.4 km	MPC · JPL
301594	2010 CC_{63}	—	April 25, 2000	Anderson Mesa	LONEOS	·	980 m	MPC · JPL
301595	2010 CX_{76}	—	February 13, 2010	Kitt Peak	Spacewatch	NYS	1.7 km	MPC · JPL
301596	2010 CN_{79}	—	February 13, 2010	Mount Lemmon	Mount Lemmon Survey	·	1.1 km	MPC · JPL
301597	2010 CV_{82}	—	February 13, 2010	Mount Lemmon	Mount Lemmon Survey	·	1.5 km	MPC · JPL
301598	2010 CH_{103}	—	February 14, 2010	Kitt Peak	Spacewatch	·	1 km	MPC · JPL
301599	2010 CQ_{103}	—	February 14, 2010	Kitt Peak	Spacewatch	NYS	1.4 km	MPC · JPL
301600	2010 CP_{126}	—	February 15, 2010	Mount Lemmon	Mount Lemmon Survey	·	980 m	MPC · JPL

== 301601–301700 ==
back to top

Designation			Discovery			Properties		Ref
Permanent	Provisional	Named after	Date	Site	Discoverer(s)	Category	Diam.	Ref
301601	2010 CH_{129}	—	February 9, 2010	Catalina	CSS	H	740 m	MPC · JPL
301602	2010 CO_{139}	—	February 13, 2010	Kitt Peak	Spacewatch	·	690 m	MPC · JPL
301603	2010 CP_{146}	—	February 13, 2010	Catalina	CSS	·	1.1 km	MPC · JPL
301604	2010 CM_{151}	—	February 14, 2010	Kitt Peak	Spacewatch	·	2.0 km	MPC · JPL
301605	2010 CJ_{152}	—	February 14, 2010	Kitt Peak	Spacewatch	NYS	1.2 km	MPC · JPL
301606	2010 CK_{153}	—	February 14, 2010	Kitt Peak	Spacewatch	·	2.0 km	MPC · JPL
301607	2010 CP_{153}	—	February 14, 2010	Kitt Peak	Spacewatch	·	1.0 km	MPC · JPL
301608	2010 CG_{185}	—	February 13, 2010	Socorro	LINEAR	·	2.9 km	MPC · JPL
301609	2010 CX_{217}	—	February 7, 2010	WISE	WISE	·	3.0 km	MPC · JPL
301610	2010 DH_{7}	—	September 13, 2004	Kitt Peak	Spacewatch	·	660 m	MPC · JPL
301611	2010 DS_{20}	—	February 16, 2010	WISE	WISE	·	2.9 km	MPC · JPL
301612	2010 DN_{34}	—	February 17, 2010	Bergisch Gladbach	W. Bickel	H	950 m	MPC · JPL
301613	2010 DQ_{37}	—	February 16, 2010	Kitt Peak	Spacewatch	·	1.3 km	MPC · JPL
301614	2010 DT_{38}	—	February 16, 2010	Kitt Peak	Spacewatch	·	1.4 km	MPC · JPL
301615	2010 DS_{48}	—	February 17, 2010	Kitt Peak	Spacewatch	·	2.0 km	MPC · JPL
301616	2010 DT_{52}	—	February 22, 2010	WISE	WISE	·	2.8 km	MPC · JPL
301617	2010 DA_{58}	—	February 24, 2010	WISE	WISE	·	4.5 km	MPC · JPL
301618	2010 DJ_{74}	—	February 18, 2010	Kitt Peak	Spacewatch	·	1.5 km	MPC · JPL
301619	2010 DJ_{75}	—	February 17, 2010	Kitt Peak	Spacewatch	·	820 m	MPC · JPL
301620	2010 DY_{75}	—	February 18, 2010	Mount Lemmon	Mount Lemmon Survey	·	610 m	MPC · JPL
301621	2010 DQ_{76}	—	February 19, 2010	Catalina	CSS	·	2.6 km	MPC · JPL
301622 Chastel	2010 DZ_{77}	Chastel	February 16, 2010	Haleakala	Pan-STARRS 1	(883)	790 m	MPC · JPL
301623 Wynn-Williams	2010 DA_{78}	Wynn-Williams	February 16, 2010	Haleakala	Pan-STARRS 1	·	1.8 km	MPC · JPL
301624	2010 EJ_{2}	—	March 1, 2010	WISE	WISE	·	4.0 km	MPC · JPL
301625	2010 EC_{21}	—	March 9, 2010	Taunus	E. Schwab, R. Kling	·	1.2 km	MPC · JPL
301626	2010 ER_{27}	—	March 11, 2010	WISE	WISE	·	3.7 km	MPC · JPL
301627	2010 EP_{28}	—	March 10, 2010	WISE	WISE	·	4.0 km	MPC · JPL
301628	2010 ED_{29}	—	March 4, 2010	Kitt Peak	Spacewatch	·	2.1 km	MPC · JPL
301629	2010 EQ_{29}	—	March 4, 2010	Kitt Peak	Spacewatch	NYS	1.1 km	MPC · JPL
301630	2010 ET_{29}	—	March 5, 2010	Catalina	CSS	·	1.5 km	MPC · JPL
301631	2010 EN_{38}	—	March 4, 2010	Kitt Peak	Spacewatch	TIN	2.7 km	MPC · JPL
301632	2010 EO_{38}	—	March 4, 2010	Catalina	CSS	H	860 m	MPC · JPL
301633	2010 EF_{39}	—	March 10, 2010	Vail-Jarnac	Jarnac	·	1.7 km	MPC · JPL
301634	2010 ES_{39}	—	March 10, 2010	La Sagra	OAM	·	1.7 km	MPC · JPL
301635	2010 EG_{40}	—	March 12, 2010	Catalina	CSS	NYS	1.2 km	MPC · JPL
301636	2010 EG_{41}	—	March 4, 2010	Kitt Peak	Spacewatch	·	1.7 km	MPC · JPL
301637	2010 EX_{43}	—	March 12, 2010	Dauban	Kugel, F.	·	1.6 km	MPC · JPL
301638 Kressin	2010 EQ_{45}	Kressin	March 14, 2010	Sonoita (IRO)	R. Kracht	·	2.4 km	MPC · JPL
301639	2010 EE_{69}	—	July 15, 2002	Palomar	NEAT	·	1.4 km	MPC · JPL
301640	2010 EO_{77}	—	March 12, 2010	Catalina	CSS	·	1.0 km	MPC · JPL
301641	2010 EV_{82}	—	March 12, 2010	Catalina	CSS	·	2.8 km	MPC · JPL
301642	2010 EN_{85}	—	March 13, 2010	Kitt Peak	Spacewatch	MAS	810 m	MPC · JPL
301643	2010 ES_{87}	—	March 13, 2010	Mount Lemmon	Mount Lemmon Survey	·	2.5 km	MPC · JPL
301644	2010 EJ_{89}	—	March 14, 2010	Kitt Peak	Spacewatch	·	1.2 km	MPC · JPL
301645	2010 EB_{97}	—	October 10, 1994	Kitt Peak	Spacewatch	·	1.0 km	MPC · JPL
301646	2010 EO_{100}	—	March 15, 2010	Kitt Peak	Spacewatch	·	2.1 km	MPC · JPL
301647	2010 EL_{105}	—	March 12, 2010	Kitt Peak	Spacewatch	·	1.4 km	MPC · JPL
301648	2010 ES_{106}	—	March 4, 2010	Kitt Peak	Spacewatch	·	1.6 km	MPC · JPL
301649	2010 EL_{107}	—	March 12, 2010	Kitt Peak	Spacewatch	·	680 m	MPC · JPL
301650	2010 EU_{107}	—	March 12, 2010	Kitt Peak	Spacewatch	·	2.6 km	MPC · JPL
301651	2010 EQ_{109}	—	March 4, 2010	Kitt Peak	Spacewatch	·	1.5 km	MPC · JPL
301652	2010 EU_{109}	—	March 4, 2010	Kitt Peak	Spacewatch	·	1.6 km	MPC · JPL
301653	2010 EP_{120}	—	September 3, 2000	Socorro	LINEAR	H	760 m	MPC · JPL
301654	2010 EV_{121}	—	March 15, 2010	Kitt Peak	Spacewatch	·	1.3 km	MPC · JPL
301655	2010 EC_{127}	—	March 15, 2010	Catalina	CSS	·	980 m	MPC · JPL
301656	2010 EW_{128}	—	March 12, 2010	Kitt Peak	Spacewatch	·	1.2 km	MPC · JPL
301657	2010 EA_{129}	—	March 12, 2010	Kitt Peak	Spacewatch	·	1.4 km	MPC · JPL
301658	2010 ET_{129}	—	March 13, 2010	Kitt Peak	Spacewatch	·	2.0 km	MPC · JPL
301659	2010 EN_{130}	—	March 13, 2010	Kitt Peak	Spacewatch	·	1.0 km	MPC · JPL
301660	2010 EO_{130}	—	March 13, 2010	Kitt Peak	Spacewatch	·	920 m	MPC · JPL
301661	2010 ES_{130}	—	March 13, 2010	Kitt Peak	Spacewatch	·	990 m	MPC · JPL
301662	2010 EO_{131}	—	March 15, 2010	Kitt Peak	Spacewatch	NYS	1.1 km	MPC · JPL
301663	2010 EY_{132}	—	March 13, 2010	Kitt Peak	Spacewatch	V	990 m	MPC · JPL
301664	2010 ET_{133}	—	March 15, 2010	Kitt Peak	Spacewatch	·	3.2 km	MPC · JPL
301665	2010 EZ_{133}	—	March 5, 2010	Kitt Peak	Spacewatch	·	2.1 km	MPC · JPL
301666	2010 EZ_{135}	—	March 14, 2010	Kitt Peak	Spacewatch	·	1.3 km	MPC · JPL
301667	2010 EV_{137}	—	March 12, 2010	Kitt Peak	Spacewatch	·	1.8 km	MPC · JPL
301668	2010 ED_{138}	—	March 13, 2010	Mount Lemmon	Mount Lemmon Survey	·	2.4 km	MPC · JPL
301669	2010 EG_{138}	—	March 13, 2010	Mount Lemmon	Mount Lemmon Survey	·	1.5 km	MPC · JPL
301670	2010 EP_{138}	—	January 26, 2006	Mount Lemmon	Mount Lemmon Survey	NYS	1.2 km	MPC · JPL
301671	2010 FQ_{12}	—	March 16, 2010	Kitt Peak	Spacewatch	·	2.3 km	MPC · JPL
301672	2010 FS_{12}	—	March 16, 2010	Kitt Peak	Spacewatch	·	1.7 km	MPC · JPL
301673	2010 FB_{13}	—	March 16, 2010	Kitt Peak	Spacewatch	MAS	800 m	MPC · JPL
301674	2010 FE_{13}	—	March 16, 2010	Kitt Peak	Spacewatch	(5)	2.2 km	MPC · JPL
301675	2010 FG_{15}	—	March 17, 2010	Kitt Peak	Spacewatch	·	770 m	MPC · JPL
301676	2010 FB_{16}	—	March 18, 2010	Kitt Peak	Spacewatch	·	930 m	MPC · JPL
301677	2010 FC_{30}	—	December 2, 2005	Kitt Peak	Spacewatch	·	730 m	MPC · JPL
301678	2010 FO_{47}	—	October 1, 2003	Kitt Peak	Spacewatch	·	1.2 km	MPC · JPL
301679	2010 FA_{48}	—	March 22, 2010	ESA OGS	ESA OGS	·	1.8 km	MPC · JPL
301680	2010 FS_{54}	—	March 21, 2010	Kitt Peak	Spacewatch	V	670 m	MPC · JPL
301681	2010 FY_{55}	—	March 18, 2010	Kitt Peak	Spacewatch	NYS	1.0 km	MPC · JPL
301682	2010 FX_{56}	—	March 16, 2010	Mount Lemmon	Mount Lemmon Survey	·	880 m	MPC · JPL
301683	2010 FX_{82}	—	October 2, 2000	Socorro	LINEAR	MAS	1.0 km	MPC · JPL
301684	2010 FM_{83}	—	March 19, 2010	Mount Lemmon	Mount Lemmon Survey	·	1.8 km	MPC · JPL
301685	2010 FA_{84}	—	March 25, 2010	Kitt Peak	Spacewatch	·	2.3 km	MPC · JPL
301686	2010 FQ_{84}	—	December 25, 2005	Kitt Peak	Spacewatch	·	890 m	MPC · JPL
301687	2010 FE_{86}	—	March 26, 2010	Kitt Peak	Spacewatch	·	4.4 km	MPC · JPL
301688	2010 FD_{88}	—	March 21, 2010	Kitt Peak	Spacewatch	·	1.4 km	MPC · JPL
301689	2010 FV_{88}	—	March 19, 2010	Kitt Peak	Spacewatch	·	1.7 km	MPC · JPL
301690	2010 FE_{89}	—	March 18, 2010	Mount Lemmon	Mount Lemmon Survey	CLA	2.2 km	MPC · JPL
301691	2010 FT_{91}	—	March 25, 2010	Mount Lemmon	Mount Lemmon Survey	·	1.5 km	MPC · JPL
301692	2010 FY_{91}	—	August 13, 2007	Anderson Mesa	LONEOS	·	1.9 km	MPC · JPL
301693	2010 FK_{92}	—	March 17, 2010	Catalina	CSS	·	2.1 km	MPC · JPL
301694	2010 FL_{92}	—	March 16, 2010	Mount Lemmon	Mount Lemmon Survey	·	910 m	MPC · JPL
301695	2010 FP_{95}	—	November 23, 1997	Kitt Peak	Spacewatch	NYS	1.1 km	MPC · JPL
301696	2010 FN_{101}	—	March 19, 2010	Kitt Peak	Spacewatch	·	1.1 km	MPC · JPL
301697	2010 GQ_{7}	—	April 5, 2010	Kitt Peak	Spacewatch	·	2.1 km	MPC · JPL
301698	2010 GY_{24}	—	April 8, 2010	La Sagra	OAM	·	2.9 km	MPC · JPL
301699	2010 GV_{25}	—	April 4, 2010	Kitt Peak	Spacewatch	·	1.3 km	MPC · JPL
301700	2010 GH_{26}	—	April 4, 2010	Kitt Peak	Spacewatch	·	1.7 km	MPC · JPL

== 301701–301800 ==
back to top

Designation			Discovery			Properties		Ref
Permanent	Provisional	Named after	Date	Site	Discoverer(s)	Category	Diam.	Ref
301701	2010 GJ_{26}	—	April 4, 2010	Kitt Peak	Spacewatch	·	1.6 km	MPC · JPL
301702	2010 GU_{27}	—	July 8, 2003	Palomar	NEAT	·	1.5 km	MPC · JPL
301703	2010 GV_{27}	—	April 5, 2010	Kitt Peak	Spacewatch	·	2.6 km	MPC · JPL
301704	2010 GW_{28}	—	April 8, 2010	La Sagra	OAM	JUN	1.4 km	MPC · JPL
301705	2010 GZ_{28}	—	April 8, 2010	Kitt Peak	Spacewatch	NYS	1.0 km	MPC · JPL
301706	2010 GB_{29}	—	April 8, 2010	Kitt Peak	Spacewatch	·	1.4 km	MPC · JPL
301707	2010 GQ_{29}	—	April 8, 2010	Purple Mountain	PMO NEO Survey Program	·	1.5 km	MPC · JPL
301708	2010 GB_{31}	—	April 4, 2010	Catalina	CSS	·	1.4 km	MPC · JPL
301709	2010 GW_{31}	—	April 5, 2010	Kitt Peak	Spacewatch	·	2.3 km	MPC · JPL
301710	2010 GU_{32}	—	April 9, 2010	Catalina	CSS	·	2.6 km	MPC · JPL
301711	2010 GW_{66}	—	April 10, 2010	Mount Lemmon	Mount Lemmon Survey	NYS	1.6 km	MPC · JPL
301712	2010 GZ_{71}	—	April 13, 2010	WISE	WISE	·	7.5 km	MPC · JPL
301713	2010 GD_{97}	—	April 6, 2010	Kitt Peak	Spacewatch	·	1.7 km	MPC · JPL
301714	2010 GF_{97}	—	April 6, 2010	Kitt Peak	Spacewatch	·	2.0 km	MPC · JPL
301715	2010 GD_{99}	—	April 4, 2010	Kitt Peak	Spacewatch	·	1.5 km	MPC · JPL
301716	2010 GK_{100}	—	April 4, 2010	Kitt Peak	Spacewatch	·	2.6 km	MPC · JPL
301717	2010 GK_{103}	—	April 6, 2010	Kitt Peak	Spacewatch	·	2.6 km	MPC · JPL
301718	2010 GE_{104}	—	September 12, 2007	Mount Lemmon	Mount Lemmon Survey	·	1.6 km	MPC · JPL
301719	2010 GO_{104}	—	April 7, 2010	Kitt Peak	Spacewatch	·	1.3 km	MPC · JPL
301720	2010 GB_{105}	—	April 7, 2010	Kitt Peak	Spacewatch	·	1.8 km	MPC · JPL
301721	2010 GR_{107}	—	April 8, 2010	Kitt Peak	Spacewatch	·	1.5 km	MPC · JPL
301722	2010 GQ_{113}	—	April 10, 2010	Kitt Peak	Spacewatch	MAS	630 m	MPC · JPL
301723	2010 GZ_{113}	—	April 10, 2010	Kitt Peak	Spacewatch	·	830 m	MPC · JPL
301724	2010 GL_{114}	—	April 10, 2010	Kitt Peak	Spacewatch	·	1.2 km	MPC · JPL
301725	2010 GZ_{114}	—	March 4, 2006	Mount Lemmon	Mount Lemmon Survey	V	790 m	MPC · JPL
301726	2010 GB_{116}	—	April 10, 2010	Kitt Peak	Spacewatch	·	2.3 km	MPC · JPL
301727	2010 GK_{119}	—	April 11, 2010	Kitt Peak	Spacewatch	EUN	1.2 km	MPC · JPL
301728	2010 GB_{120}	—	April 11, 2010	Kitt Peak	Spacewatch	·	1.7 km	MPC · JPL
301729	2010 GR_{120}	—	April 11, 2010	Kitt Peak	Spacewatch	·	2.2 km	MPC · JPL
301730	2010 GU_{126}	—	January 15, 2001	Kitt Peak	Spacewatch	·	1.2 km	MPC · JPL
301731	2010 GT_{127}	—	April 10, 2010	Kitt Peak	Spacewatch	·	1.7 km	MPC · JPL
301732	2010 GF_{131}	—	April 9, 2010	Kitt Peak	Spacewatch	·	1.7 km	MPC · JPL
301733	2010 GA_{137}	—	March 13, 2002	Palomar	NEAT	·	1.5 km	MPC · JPL
301734	2010 GL_{141}	—	April 8, 2010	La Sagra	OAM	BRG	2.3 km	MPC · JPL
301735	2010 GJ_{144}	—	October 21, 2003	Kitt Peak	Spacewatch	·	1.1 km	MPC · JPL
301736	2010 GV_{144}	—	April 12, 2010	Mount Lemmon	Mount Lemmon Survey	·	820 m	MPC · JPL
301737	2010 GK_{156}	—	April 4, 2010	Kitt Peak	Spacewatch	·	880 m	MPC · JPL
301738	2010 GH_{157}	—	April 9, 2010	Kitt Peak	Spacewatch	·	880 m	MPC · JPL
301739	2010 GV_{157}	—	April 11, 2010	Mount Lemmon	Mount Lemmon Survey	·	2.5 km	MPC · JPL
301740	2010 GZ_{157}	—	April 12, 2010	Kitt Peak	Spacewatch	GEF	1.6 km	MPC · JPL
301741	2010 GE_{160}	—	April 8, 2010	Catalina	CSS	·	1.7 km	MPC · JPL
301742	2010 GS_{160}	—	April 9, 2010	Catalina	CSS	·	3.4 km	MPC · JPL
301743	2010 GU_{161}	—	April 14, 2010	Mount Lemmon	Mount Lemmon Survey	GEF	3.0 km	MPC · JPL
301744	2010 HV_{64}	—	April 26, 2010	WISE	WISE	·	5.8 km	MPC · JPL
301745	2010 HN_{79}	—	April 20, 2010	Kitt Peak	Spacewatch	·	1.5 km	MPC · JPL
301746	2010 HQ_{79}	—	April 20, 2010	Kitt Peak	Spacewatch	·	2.0 km	MPC · JPL
301747	2010 HK_{80}	—	April 26, 2010	Mount Lemmon	Mount Lemmon Survey	·	1.6 km	MPC · JPL
301748	2010 HQ_{103}	—	April 21, 2010	Kitt Peak	Spacewatch	NYS	1.2 km	MPC · JPL
301749	2010 HT_{103}	—	April 25, 2010	Kitt Peak	Spacewatch	BRA	1.9 km	MPC · JPL
301750	2010 HM_{105}	—	April 20, 2010	Bergisch Gladbach	W. Bickel	·	3.7 km	MPC · JPL
301751	2010 HF_{107}	—	October 29, 1999	Kitt Peak	Spacewatch	·	1.3 km	MPC · JPL
301752	2010 JL	—	May 3, 2010	Nogales	Tenagra II	·	3.2 km	MPC · JPL
301753	2010 JZ	—	February 25, 2006	Mount Lemmon	Mount Lemmon Survey	L5	12 km	MPC · JPL
301754	2010 JQ_{29}	—	May 3, 2010	Kitt Peak	Spacewatch	(18466)	2.3 km	MPC · JPL
301755	2010 JL_{30}	—	May 3, 2010	Kitt Peak	Spacewatch	·	1.1 km	MPC · JPL
301756	2010 JU_{30}	—	October 2, 1996	La Silla	E. W. Elst	·	2.3 km	MPC · JPL
301757	2010 JW_{30}	—	May 4, 2010	Catalina	CSS	slow	1.9 km	MPC · JPL
301758	2010 JA_{34}	—	May 4, 2010	Catalina	CSS	·	1.9 km	MPC · JPL
301759	2010 JL_{35}	—	February 27, 2006	Kitt Peak	Spacewatch	NYS	1.7 km	MPC · JPL
301760	2010 JP_{42}	—	February 17, 2007	Mount Lemmon	Mount Lemmon Survey	L5	16 km	MPC · JPL
301761	2010 JL_{43}	—	May 3, 2010	Kitt Peak	Spacewatch	·	3.2 km	MPC · JPL
301762	2010 JM_{43}	—	May 3, 2010	Kitt Peak	Spacewatch	EUN	1.2 km	MPC · JPL
301763	2010 JB_{44}	—	May 4, 2010	Siding Spring	SSS	·	2.3 km	MPC · JPL
301764	2010 JQ_{44}	—	May 6, 2010	Mount Lemmon	Mount Lemmon Survey	·	1.4 km	MPC · JPL
301765	2010 JQ_{45}	—	May 7, 2010	Kitt Peak	Spacewatch	·	2.6 km	MPC · JPL
301766	2010 JU_{48}	—	September 5, 2000	Kitt Peak	Spacewatch	·	3.3 km	MPC · JPL
301767	2010 JX_{73}	—	May 8, 2010	Mount Lemmon	Mount Lemmon Survey	·	2.4 km	MPC · JPL
301768	2010 JD_{79}	—	April 18, 2005	Kitt Peak	Spacewatch	·	2.4 km	MPC · JPL
301769	2010 JZ_{81}	—	May 3, 2010	Kitt Peak	Spacewatch	·	3.8 km	MPC · JPL
301770	2010 JK_{87}	—	May 12, 2010	Calvin-Rehoboth	L. A. Molnar	MAR	1.4 km	MPC · JPL
301771	2010 JD_{117}	—	May 6, 2006	Kitt Peak	Spacewatch	·	2.8 km	MPC · JPL
301772	2010 JK_{120}	—	May 12, 2010	Mount Lemmon	Mount Lemmon Survey	·	3.3 km	MPC · JPL
301773	2010 JC_{121}	—	May 12, 2010	Mount Lemmon	Mount Lemmon Survey	GEF	1.7 km	MPC · JPL
301774	2010 JD_{121}	—	May 12, 2010	Mount Lemmon	Mount Lemmon Survey	BRA	2.5 km	MPC · JPL
301775	2010 JW_{121}	—	May 13, 2010	Kitt Peak	Spacewatch	·	3.5 km	MPC · JPL
301776	2010 JQ_{122}	—	May 13, 2010	Kitt Peak	Spacewatch	·	1.9 km	MPC · JPL
301777	2010 JG_{147}	—	May 5, 2010	Mount Lemmon	Mount Lemmon Survey	·	2.4 km	MPC · JPL
301778	2010 JK_{148}	—	March 11, 2002	Palomar	NEAT	·	1.8 km	MPC · JPL
301779	2010 JL_{149}	—	May 29, 2006	Kitt Peak	Spacewatch	EUN	1.7 km	MPC · JPL
301780	2010 JK_{153}	—	September 21, 2003	Palomar	NEAT	MAR	1.6 km	MPC · JPL
301781	2010 JZ_{159}	—	October 11, 2007	Kitt Peak	Spacewatch	·	1.5 km	MPC · JPL
301782	2010 JP_{165}	—	May 11, 2010	Mount Lemmon	Mount Lemmon Survey	HOF	3.4 km	MPC · JPL
301783	2010 JB_{167}	—	May 11, 2010	Mount Lemmon	Mount Lemmon Survey	TRE	3.6 km	MPC · JPL
301784	2010 JS_{170}	—	May 10, 2005	Kitt Peak	Spacewatch	·	2.2 km	MPC · JPL
301785	2010 KV_{8}	—	February 19, 2001	Socorro	LINEAR	·	1.7 km	MPC · JPL
301786	2010 KD_{9}	—	May 16, 2010	Nogales	Tenagra II	·	1.7 km	MPC · JPL
301787	2010 KE_{62}	—	May 18, 2010	Siding Spring	SSS	BRG	2.6 km	MPC · JPL
301788	2010 KF_{127}	—	May 22, 2010	Siding Spring	SSS	·	1.6 km	MPC · JPL
301789	2010 KG_{128}	—	November 10, 2004	Kitt Peak	Spacewatch	V	820 m	MPC · JPL
301790	2010 LO_{1}	—	June 4, 2010	Nogales	Tenagra II	·	1.9 km	MPC · JPL
301791	2010 LQ_{14}	—	June 3, 2010	Kitt Peak	Spacewatch	·	1.7 km	MPC · JPL
301792	2010 LX_{14}	—	June 3, 2010	Kitt Peak	Spacewatch	V	750 m	MPC · JPL
301793	2010 LA_{15}	—	June 3, 2010	Kitt Peak	Spacewatch	·	1.7 km	MPC · JPL
301794 Antoninkapustin	2010 LH_{64}	Antoninkapustin	June 12, 2010	Zelenchukskaya Stn	T. V. Krjačko	·	3.9 km	MPC · JPL
301795	2010 LG_{107}	—	January 15, 2005	Socorro	LINEAR	·	1.5 km	MPC · JPL
301796	2010 OW_{41}	—	July 21, 2010	WISE	WISE	CYB	5.1 km	MPC · JPL
301797	2010 OL_{83}	—	July 26, 2010	WISE	WISE	·	4.0 km	MPC · JPL
301798	2010 OT_{84}	—	July 26, 2010	WISE	WISE	·	1.8 km	MPC · JPL
301799	2010 RW_{70}	—	May 26, 2006	Mount Lemmon	Mount Lemmon Survey	·	1.2 km	MPC · JPL
301800	2011 BL_{60}	—	October 1, 2000	Socorro	LINEAR	·	2.6 km	MPC · JPL

== 301801–301900 ==
back to top

Designation			Discovery			Properties		Ref
Permanent	Provisional	Named after	Date	Site	Discoverer(s)	Category	Diam.	Ref
301801	2011 BT_{79}	—	March 13, 2004	Palomar	NEAT	·	1.4 km	MPC · JPL
301802	2011 BS_{100}	—	May 1, 2003	Kitt Peak	Spacewatch	·	1.8 km	MPC · JPL
301803	2011 MM_{2}	—	September 15, 2006	Kitt Peak	Spacewatch	·	3.9 km	MPC · JPL
301804	2011 MT_{5}	—	August 19, 2004	Siding Spring	SSS	·	1.3 km	MPC · JPL
301805	2011 MX_{6}	—	October 15, 2001	Palomar	NEAT	·	930 m	MPC · JPL
301806	2011 MP_{8}	—	September 3, 2000	Socorro	LINEAR	·	1.6 km	MPC · JPL
301807	2011 NQ_{2}	—	July 18, 2002	Socorro	LINEAR	·	2.6 km	MPC · JPL
301808	2011 OO_{10}	—	March 8, 2005	Mount Lemmon	Mount Lemmon Survey	·	2.2 km	MPC · JPL
301809	2011 OG_{12}	—	November 11, 2004	Kitt Peak	Spacewatch	·	1.3 km	MPC · JPL
301810	2011 OW_{14}	—	October 1, 2000	Socorro	LINEAR	·	1.4 km	MPC · JPL
301811	2011 OE_{20}	—	September 23, 2008	Kitt Peak	Spacewatch	·	750 m	MPC · JPL
301812	2011 OW_{24}	—	September 14, 2007	Catalina	CSS	·	1.9 km	MPC · JPL
301813	2011 OA_{25}	—	October 18, 2004	Goodricke-Pigott	R. A. Tucker	·	1.3 km	MPC · JPL
301814	2011 PJ_{3}	—	October 21, 2006	Catalina	CSS	·	5.0 km	MPC · JPL
301815	2011 PF_{4}	—	June 28, 2004	Siding Spring	SSS	·	1.2 km	MPC · JPL
301816	2011 PO_{4}	—	October 2, 2000	Socorro	LINEAR	V	1.1 km	MPC · JPL
301817	2011 PB_{6}	—	October 24, 2003	Apache Point	SDSS	BRG	1.2 km	MPC · JPL
301818	2011 PC_{6}	—	August 31, 2000	Socorro	LINEAR	·	4.3 km	MPC · JPL
301819	2011 PE_{6}	—	July 10, 2005	Siding Spring	SSS	LIX	5.0 km	MPC · JPL
301820	2011 PK_{8}	—	September 10, 2007	Mount Lemmon	Mount Lemmon Survey	·	1.5 km	MPC · JPL
301821	2011 PP_{8}	—	March 17, 2004	Kitt Peak	Spacewatch	EOS	2.1 km	MPC · JPL
301822	2011 PB_{9}	—	March 14, 2007	Kitt Peak	Spacewatch	·	2.0 km	MPC · JPL
301823	2011 PC_{9}	—	October 23, 2003	Kitt Peak	Spacewatch	(5)	1.1 km	MPC · JPL
301824	2011 PE_{9}	—	September 15, 2006	Kitt Peak	Spacewatch	·	2.1 km	MPC · JPL
301825	2011 PK_{9}	—	September 18, 2003	Kitt Peak	Spacewatch	·	970 m	MPC · JPL
301826	2011 PS_{9}	—	August 31, 2000	Socorro	LINEAR	NYS	1.6 km	MPC · JPL
301827	2011 QY_{1}	—	January 16, 2004	Kitt Peak	Spacewatch	MRX	1.4 km	MPC · JPL
301828	2011 QM_{7}	—	January 27, 2003	Palomar	NEAT	·	3.1 km	MPC · JPL
301829	2011 QG_{8}	—	January 7, 2006	Mount Lemmon	Mount Lemmon Survey	·	2.4 km	MPC · JPL
301830	2011 QF_{12}	—	December 20, 2004	Mount Lemmon	Mount Lemmon Survey	·	1.0 km	MPC · JPL
301831	2011 QH_{14}	—	March 8, 2000	Cerro Tololo	Deep Lens Survey	·	950 m	MPC · JPL
301832	2011 QT_{16}	—	November 16, 2001	Kitt Peak	Spacewatch	·	910 m	MPC · JPL
301833	2011 QY_{24}	—	August 24, 2007	Kitt Peak	Spacewatch	·	1.2 km	MPC · JPL
301834	2011 QT_{33}	—	October 11, 2006	Palomar	NEAT	·	3.9 km	MPC · JPL
301835	2011 QY_{49}	—	March 10, 2005	Mount Lemmon	Mount Lemmon Survey	·	5.6 km	MPC · JPL
301836	2011 RQ_{1}	—	September 30, 2003	Kitt Peak	Spacewatch	·	1.8 km	MPC · JPL
301837	5581 P-L	—	October 22, 1960	Palomar	C. J. van Houten, I. van Houten-Groeneveld, T. Gehrels	·	1.9 km	MPC · JPL
301838	6226 P-L	—	September 24, 1960	Palomar	C. J. van Houten, I. van Houten-Groeneveld, T. Gehrels	·	4.5 km	MPC · JPL
301839	1488 T-2	—	September 29, 1973	Palomar	C. J. van Houten, I. van Houten-Groeneveld, T. Gehrels	·	700 m	MPC · JPL
301840	4212 T-3	—	October 16, 1977	Palomar	C. J. van Houten, I. van Houten-Groeneveld, T. Gehrels	·	3.6 km	MPC · JPL
301841	4260 T-3	—	October 16, 1977	Palomar	C. J. van Houten, I. van Houten-Groeneveld, T. Gehrels	EUN	1.7 km	MPC · JPL
301842	1980 FG_{4}	—	March 16, 1980	La Silla	C.-I. Lagerkvist	·	9.0 km	MPC · JPL
301843	1981 DZ_{2}	—	February 28, 1981	Siding Spring	S. J. Bus	·	3.8 km	MPC · JPL
301844	1990 UA	—	October 16, 1990	Palomar	E. F. Helin	APO · PHA	400 m	MPC · JPL
301845	1992 SS_{4}	—	September 24, 1992	Kitt Peak	Spacewatch	GEF	1.4 km	MPC · JPL
301846	1993 OV_{1}	—	July 16, 1993	Palomar	E. F. Helin, K. J. Lawrence	·	1.4 km	MPC · JPL
301847	1994 AE_{5}	—	January 5, 1994	Kitt Peak	Spacewatch	NYS	1.1 km	MPC · JPL
301848	1994 PQ_{3}	—	August 10, 1994	La Silla	E. W. Elst	·	2.7 km	MPC · JPL
301849	1994 SC_{7}	—	September 28, 1994	Kitt Peak	Spacewatch	·	780 m	MPC · JPL
301850	1994 TE_{8}	—	October 6, 1994	Kitt Peak	Spacewatch	THM	2.4 km	MPC · JPL
301851	1994 UF_{8}	—	October 28, 1994	Kitt Peak	Spacewatch	·	1.4 km	MPC · JPL
301852	1994 WP_{4}	—	November 26, 1994	Kitt Peak	Spacewatch	·	1.8 km	MPC · JPL
301853	1994 WU_{4}	—	November 26, 1994	Kitt Peak	Spacewatch	·	2.1 km	MPC · JPL
301854	1995 BS_{14}	—	January 31, 1995	Kitt Peak	Spacewatch	·	1.3 km	MPC · JPL
301855	1995 CY_{1}	—	February 7, 1995	Siding Spring	R. H. McNaught	PHO	1.6 km	MPC · JPL
301856	1995 ES_{4}	—	March 2, 1995	Kitt Peak	Spacewatch	·	1.8 km	MPC · JPL
301857	1995 MV_{2}	—	June 25, 1995	Kitt Peak	Spacewatch	·	1.6 km	MPC · JPL
301858	1995 QX_{15}	—	August 31, 1995	Kitt Peak	Spacewatch	EOS	1.8 km	MPC · JPL
301859	1995 SV_{10}	—	September 17, 1995	Kitt Peak	Spacewatch	EOS	2.6 km	MPC · JPL
301860	1995 SW_{35}	—	September 23, 1995	Kitt Peak	Spacewatch	·	1.5 km	MPC · JPL
301861	1995 SG_{50}	—	September 26, 1995	Kitt Peak	Spacewatch	·	1.9 km	MPC · JPL
301862	1995 SO_{62}	—	September 25, 1995	Kitt Peak	Spacewatch	·	2.0 km	MPC · JPL
301863	1995 SP_{69}	—	September 18, 1995	Kitt Peak	Spacewatch	·	2.0 km	MPC · JPL
301864	1995 SK_{80}	—	September 26, 1995	Kitt Peak	Spacewatch	3:2	4.6 km	MPC · JPL
301865	1995 SM_{80}	—	September 26, 1995	Kitt Peak	Spacewatch	EOS	1.9 km	MPC · JPL
301866	1995 TR_{8}	—	October 1, 1995	Kitt Peak	Spacewatch	·	4.7 km	MPC · JPL
301867	1995 UR_{17}	—	October 18, 1995	Kitt Peak	Spacewatch	ANF	1.6 km	MPC · JPL
301868	1995 UW_{50}	—	October 18, 1995	Kitt Peak	Spacewatch	T_{j} (2.99) · 3:2	4.3 km	MPC · JPL
301869	1995 VZ_{2}	—	November 14, 1995	Kitt Peak	Spacewatch	·	2.3 km	MPC · JPL
301870	1995 WE_{10}	—	November 16, 1995	Kitt Peak	Spacewatch	3:2 · SHU	4.8 km	MPC · JPL
301871	1995 WH_{20}	—	November 17, 1995	Kitt Peak	Spacewatch	EOS	2.0 km	MPC · JPL
301872	1995 WV_{21}	—	November 17, 1995	Kitt Peak	Spacewatch	·	1.3 km	MPC · JPL
301873	1995 WX_{24}	—	November 18, 1995	Kitt Peak	Spacewatch	EOS	4.2 km	MPC · JPL
301874	1995 WV_{38}	—	November 23, 1995	Kitt Peak	Spacewatch	EMA	2.9 km	MPC · JPL
301875	1996 BN_{12}	—	January 24, 1996	Kitt Peak	Spacewatch	(5)	1.5 km	MPC · JPL
301876	1996 EA_{7}	—	March 11, 1996	Kitt Peak	Spacewatch	·	2.2 km	MPC · JPL
301877	1996 JZ_{9}	—	May 13, 1996	Kitt Peak	Spacewatch	·	970 m	MPC · JPL
301878	1996 VU_{39}	—	November 7, 1996	Kitt Peak	Spacewatch	NYS	1.1 km	MPC · JPL
301879	1997 HK_{13}	—	April 30, 1997	Socorro	LINEAR	·	4.7 km	MPC · JPL
301880	1997 HT_{15}	—	April 29, 1997	Kitt Peak	Spacewatch	·	3.7 km	MPC · JPL
301881	1997 TV_{21}	—	October 4, 1997	Kitt Peak	Spacewatch	·	2.3 km	MPC · JPL
301882	1998 BN_{36}	—	January 18, 1998	Kitt Peak	Spacewatch	NYS	1.2 km	MPC · JPL
301883	1998 EQ_{9}	—	March 9, 1998	Teide	Teide	·	2.2 km	MPC · JPL
301884	1998 KB_{3}	—	May 23, 1998	Kitt Peak	Spacewatch	·	5.4 km	MPC · JPL
301885	1998 QV_{2}	—	August 17, 1998	Socorro	LINEAR	·	2.5 km	MPC · JPL
301886	1998 QY_{4}	—	August 22, 1998	Xinglong	SCAP	·	1.7 km	MPC · JPL
301887	1998 QX_{23}	—	August 17, 1998	Socorro	LINEAR	·	1.8 km	MPC · JPL
301888	1998 QC_{28}	—	August 26, 1998	Kitt Peak	Spacewatch	·	1.5 km	MPC · JPL
301889	1998 QH_{85}	—	August 24, 1998	Socorro	LINEAR	EUN	1.7 km	MPC · JPL
301890	1998 QO_{94}	—	August 17, 1998	Socorro	LINEAR	·	2.8 km	MPC · JPL
301891	1998 QP_{95}	—	August 19, 1998	Socorro	LINEAR	·	1.8 km	MPC · JPL
301892	1998 QL_{98}	—	August 28, 1998	Socorro	LINEAR	·	2.8 km	MPC · JPL
301893	1998 RR_{12}	—	September 14, 1998	Kitt Peak	Spacewatch	·	1.6 km	MPC · JPL
301894	1998 RX_{28}	—	September 14, 1998	Socorro	LINEAR	·	2.2 km	MPC · JPL
301895	1998 RH_{42}	—	September 14, 1998	Socorro	LINEAR	EUN	1.6 km	MPC · JPL
301896	1998 SH_{5}	—	September 16, 1998	Kitt Peak	Spacewatch	(5)	1.5 km	MPC · JPL
301897	1998 SE_{12}	—	September 22, 1998	Caussols	ODAS	·	2.5 km	MPC · JPL
301898	1998 SP_{34}	—	September 26, 1998	Socorro	LINEAR	·	2.2 km	MPC · JPL
301899	1998 SA_{46}	—	September 25, 1998	Kitt Peak	Spacewatch	·	1.6 km	MPC · JPL
301900	1998 SM_{89}	—	September 26, 1998	Socorro	LINEAR	·	1.6 km	MPC · JPL

== 301901–302000 ==
back to top

Designation			Discovery			Properties		Ref
Permanent	Provisional	Named after	Date	Site	Discoverer(s)	Category	Diam.	Ref
301901	1998 UP_{14}	—	October 23, 1998	Kitt Peak	Spacewatch	·	2.1 km	MPC · JPL
301902	1998 UG_{19}	—	October 28, 1998	Socorro	LINEAR	·	2.2 km	MPC · JPL
301903	1998 UR_{50}	—	October 17, 1998	Kitt Peak	Spacewatch	·	2.0 km	MPC · JPL
301904	1998 WN_{32}	—	November 19, 1998	Anderson Mesa	LONEOS	·	2.0 km	MPC · JPL
301905	1998 WR_{41}	—	November 24, 1998	Socorro	LINEAR	·	2.7 km	MPC · JPL
301906	1998 XV_{5}	—	December 8, 1998	Kitt Peak	Spacewatch	·	2.7 km	MPC · JPL
301907	1998 XB_{9}	—	December 12, 1998	Socorro	LINEAR	·	2.8 km	MPC · JPL
301908	1998 XM_{14}	—	December 15, 1998	Caussols	ODAS	·	2.0 km	MPC · JPL
301909	1998 XK_{15}	—	December 15, 1998	Caussols	ODAS	·	1.5 km	MPC · JPL
301910	1998 YM_{8}	—	December 25, 1998	Catalina	CSS	·	3.9 km	MPC · JPL
301911	1998 YW_{19}	—	December 25, 1998	Kitt Peak	Spacewatch	·	1.5 km	MPC · JPL
301912	1999 BU_{31}	—	January 19, 1999	Kitt Peak	Spacewatch	·	660 m	MPC · JPL
301913	1999 FC_{73}	—	March 20, 1999	Apache Point	SDSS	·	2.3 km	MPC · JPL
301914	1999 JT_{110}	—	May 13, 1999	Socorro	LINEAR	·	1.4 km	MPC · JPL
301915	1999 LY_{2}	—	June 5, 1999	Kitt Peak	Spacewatch	V	860 m	MPC · JPL
301916	1999 RL_{185}	—	September 9, 1999	Socorro	LINEAR	NYS	1.1 km	MPC · JPL
301917	1999 SK_{2}	—	September 18, 1999	Kitt Peak	Spacewatch	·	2.2 km	MPC · JPL
301918	1999 TJ_{64}	—	October 8, 1999	Kitt Peak	Spacewatch	·	3.5 km	MPC · JPL
301919	1999 TX_{194}	—	October 12, 1999	Socorro	LINEAR	·	1.5 km	MPC · JPL
301920	1999 VJ_{100}	—	November 9, 1999	Socorro	LINEAR	·	890 m	MPC · JPL
301921	1999 VA_{137}	—	November 12, 1999	Socorro	LINEAR	·	1.6 km	MPC · JPL
301922	1999 VH_{159}	—	November 14, 1999	Socorro	LINEAR	·	2.1 km	MPC · JPL
301923	1999 VV_{187}	—	November 15, 1999	Socorro	LINEAR	·	5.0 km	MPC · JPL
301924	1999 VM_{209}	—	November 14, 1999	Kitt Peak	Spacewatch	·	1.2 km	MPC · JPL
301925	1999 XZ_{69}	—	December 7, 1999	Socorro	LINEAR	·	2.8 km	MPC · JPL
301926	1999 XZ_{84}	—	December 7, 1999	Socorro	LINEAR	·	3.2 km	MPC · JPL
301927	1999 XH_{104}	—	December 7, 1999	Socorro	LINEAR	·	4.4 km	MPC · JPL
301928	1999 XF_{161}	—	December 12, 1999	Socorro	LINEAR	·	1.6 km	MPC · JPL
301929	1999 XP_{189}	—	December 12, 1999	Socorro	LINEAR	MAR	1.5 km	MPC · JPL
301930	1999 XC_{253}	—	December 12, 1999	Kitt Peak	Spacewatch	·	1.6 km	MPC · JPL
301931	1999 YP_{10}	—	December 27, 1999	Kitt Peak	Spacewatch	·	1.7 km	MPC · JPL
301932	2000 AL_{1}	—	January 2, 2000	Socorro	LINEAR	·	3.9 km	MPC · JPL
301933	2000 AU_{32}	—	January 13, 2000	Kitt Peak	Spacewatch	·	1.3 km	MPC · JPL
301934	2000 AE_{48}	—	January 3, 2000	Gnosca	S. Sposetti	·	2.3 km	MPC · JPL
301935	2000 AG_{66}	—	January 4, 2000	Socorro	LINEAR	·	2.3 km	MPC · JPL
301936	2000 AH_{97}	—	January 4, 2000	Socorro	LINEAR	·	3.8 km	MPC · JPL
301937	2000 AN_{123}	—	January 5, 2000	Socorro	LINEAR	·	2.4 km	MPC · JPL
301938	2000 AD_{133}	—	January 3, 2000	Socorro	LINEAR	(5)	2.3 km	MPC · JPL
301939	2000 AE_{135}	—	January 4, 2000	Socorro	LINEAR	(5)	1.8 km	MPC · JPL
301940	2000 AA_{214}	—	January 6, 2000	Kitt Peak	Spacewatch	EUN	1.7 km	MPC · JPL
301941	2000 AS_{221}	—	January 8, 2000	Kitt Peak	Spacewatch	(5)	1.4 km	MPC · JPL
301942	2000 AP_{234}	—	January 5, 2000	Socorro	LINEAR	·	1.5 km	MPC · JPL
301943	2000 AK_{235}	—	January 5, 2000	Socorro	LINEAR	·	1.4 km	MPC · JPL
301944	2000 AS_{254}	—	January 3, 2000	Kitt Peak	Spacewatch	L4	10 km	MPC · JPL
301945	2000 BC_{15}	—	January 31, 2000	Oizumi	T. Kobayashi	slow	2.3 km	MPC · JPL
301946 Bugyi	2000 BK_{15}	Bugyi	January 28, 2000	Piszkéstető	K. Sárneczky, G. Szabó	(5)	1.4 km	MPC · JPL
301947	2000 CU_{10}	—	February 2, 2000	Socorro	LINEAR	·	1.7 km	MPC · JPL
301948	2000 CZ_{20}	—	February 2, 2000	Socorro	LINEAR	·	3.1 km	MPC · JPL
301949 Hambálek	2000 CM_{34}	Hambálek	February 3, 2000	Ondřejov	P. Kušnirák	·	1.7 km	MPC · JPL
301950	2000 CE_{45}	—	February 2, 2000	Socorro	LINEAR	·	2.1 km	MPC · JPL
301951	2000 CZ_{79}	—	February 8, 2000	Kitt Peak	Spacewatch	·	1.4 km	MPC · JPL
301952	2000 CT_{124}	—	February 3, 2000	Socorro	LINEAR	·	2.0 km	MPC · JPL
301953	2000 CL_{130}	—	February 3, 2000	Kitt Peak	Spacewatch	·	2.1 km	MPC · JPL
301954	2000 CB_{135}	—	February 4, 2000	Kitt Peak	Spacewatch	·	1.4 km	MPC · JPL
301955	2000 DW_{9}	—	February 26, 2000	Kitt Peak	Spacewatch	·	1.1 km	MPC · JPL
301956	2000 DR_{26}	—	February 29, 2000	Socorro	LINEAR	(5)	1.5 km	MPC · JPL
301957	2000 DK_{30}	—	February 29, 2000	Socorro	LINEAR	·	2.6 km	MPC · JPL
301958	2000 DQ_{49}	—	February 29, 2000	Socorro	LINEAR	JUN	1.3 km	MPC · JPL
301959	2000 DA_{68}	—	February 29, 2000	Socorro	LINEAR	·	1.3 km	MPC · JPL
301960	2000 DP_{76}	—	February 29, 2000	Socorro	LINEAR	·	1.7 km	MPC · JPL
301961	2000 DF_{116}	—	February 28, 2000	Catalina	CSS	·	2.3 km	MPC · JPL
301962	2000 ET_{26}	—	March 9, 2000	Socorro	LINEAR	·	2.9 km	MPC · JPL
301963	2000 EF_{34}	—	March 5, 2000	Socorro	LINEAR	·	2.2 km	MPC · JPL
301964	2000 EJ_{37}	—	March 8, 2000	Socorro	LINEAR	T_{j} (2.44) · unusual	11 km	MPC · JPL
301965	2000 EN_{172}	—	March 14, 2000	Catalina	CSS	·	2.2 km	MPC · JPL
301966	2000 EJ_{198}	—	March 1, 2000	Catalina	CSS	·	1.9 km	MPC · JPL
301967	2000 FS_{1}	—	March 25, 2000	Kitt Peak	Spacewatch	NEM	2.7 km	MPC · JPL
301968	2000 FX_{2}	—	March 28, 2000	Socorro	LINEAR	·	4.4 km	MPC · JPL
301969	2000 FP_{9}	—	March 30, 2000	Kitt Peak	Spacewatch	·	770 m	MPC · JPL
301970	2000 GE_{27}	—	April 5, 2000	Socorro	LINEAR	JUN	1.6 km	MPC · JPL
301971	2000 GS_{29}	—	April 5, 2000	Socorro	LINEAR	EUN	1.5 km	MPC · JPL
301972	2000 GE_{142}	—	April 7, 2000	Anderson Mesa	LONEOS	JUN	1.3 km	MPC · JPL
301973	2000 GV_{170}	—	April 5, 2000	Anderson Mesa	LONEOS	·	860 m	MPC · JPL
301974	2000 GU_{171}	—	April 2, 2000	Socorro	LINEAR	·	2.0 km	MPC · JPL
301975	2000 HL	—	April 24, 2000	Kitt Peak	Spacewatch	·	2.5 km	MPC · JPL
301976	2000 HX_{17}	—	April 24, 2000	Kitt Peak	Spacewatch	·	2.0 km	MPC · JPL
301977	2000 HY_{39}	—	April 30, 2000	Kitt Peak	Spacewatch	(12739)	2.3 km	MPC · JPL
301978	2000 HE_{81}	—	April 28, 2000	Kitt Peak	Spacewatch	·	2.4 km	MPC · JPL
301979	2000 JC_{2}	—	May 1, 2000	Kitt Peak	Spacewatch	·	570 m	MPC · JPL
301980	2000 JO_{8}	—	May 6, 2000	Socorro	LINEAR	PHO	1.3 km	MPC · JPL
301981	2000 JB_{20}	—	May 6, 2000	Socorro	LINEAR	·	890 m	MPC · JPL
301982	2000 KT_{4}	—	May 27, 2000	Socorro	LINEAR	PHO	1.3 km	MPC · JPL
301983	2000 KW_{40}	—	May 30, 2000	Kitt Peak	Spacewatch	·	2.3 km	MPC · JPL
301984	2000 KC_{43}	—	May 26, 2000	Kitt Peak	Spacewatch	BRA	2.3 km	MPC · JPL
301985	2000 KH_{66}	—	May 27, 2000	Socorro	LINEAR	·	1.0 km	MPC · JPL
301986	2000 LF_{7}	—	June 6, 2000	Kitt Peak	Spacewatch	BAP	1.1 km	MPC · JPL
301987	2000 NS	—	July 3, 2000	Prescott	P. G. Comba	·	1.1 km	MPC · JPL
301988	2000 NN_{10}	—	July 9, 2000	Socorro	LINEAR	PHO	1.9 km	MPC · JPL
301989	2000 OL_{61}	—	July 29, 2000	Cerro Tololo	M. W. Buie	·	1.1 km	MPC · JPL
301990	2000 OA_{62}	—	July 30, 2000	Cerro Tololo	M. W. Buie	·	880 m	MPC · JPL
301991	2000 PM_{1}	—	August 1, 2000	Socorro	LINEAR	·	1.2 km	MPC · JPL
301992	2000 QH_{14}	—	August 24, 2000	Socorro	LINEAR	V	890 m	MPC · JPL
301993	2000 QB_{41}	—	August 24, 2000	Socorro	LINEAR	NYS	1.2 km	MPC · JPL
301994	2000 QJ_{53}	—	August 24, 2000	Socorro	LINEAR	·	2.9 km	MPC · JPL
301995	2000 QW_{85}	—	August 25, 2000	Socorro	LINEAR	·	1.6 km	MPC · JPL
301996	2000 QU_{86}	—	August 25, 2000	Socorro	LINEAR	·	1.7 km	MPC · JPL
301997	2000 QC_{117}	—	August 29, 2000	Socorro	LINEAR	NYS	1.1 km	MPC · JPL
301998	2000 QW_{147}	—	August 31, 2000	Socorro	LINEAR	T_{j} (2.99)	2.1 km	MPC · JPL
301999	2000 QC_{157}	—	August 31, 2000	Socorro	LINEAR	·	1.8 km	MPC · JPL
302000	2000 QD_{163}	—	August 31, 2000	Socorro	LINEAR	·	1.2 km	MPC · JPL

back to top

== See also ==
- Meanings of minor-planet names: 301001–302000
