= Heiner Thiel =

German sculptor and curator

- Born: January 14, 1957 (age 69); Bernkastel-Kues, Rhineland-Palatinate, West Germany
- Known for: Concrete art sculpture
- Movement: Minimalism
- Website: heiner-thiel.de

Heiner Thiel (born January 14, 1957) is a German sculptor and curator. He is an exponent of concrete art.

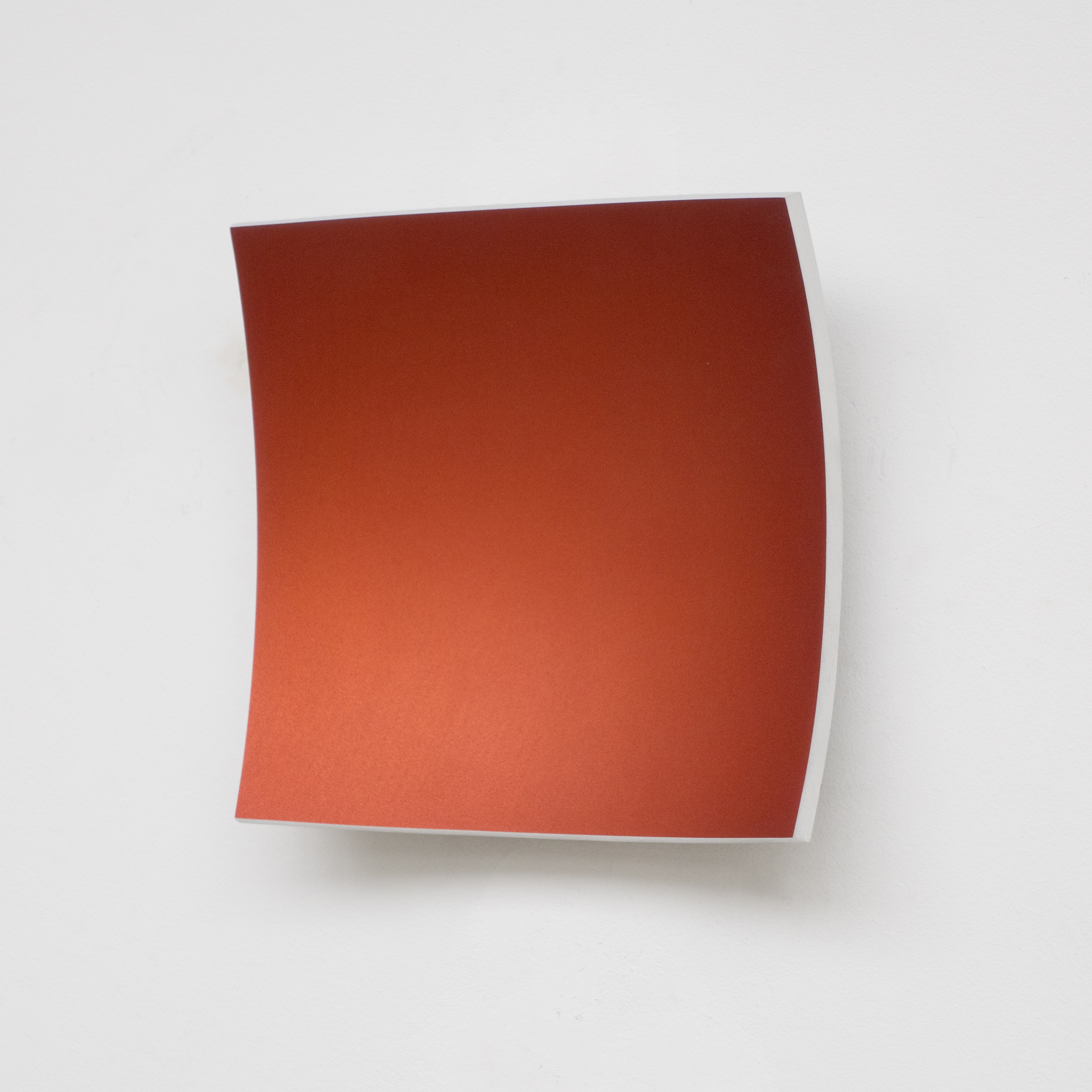
Untitled, 2016

== Life ==
Thiel studied history of art from 1978 to 1982 at the Johannes Gutenberg University in Mainz, and then went to the Städelschule in Frankfurt from 1983 to 1985. There he studied sculpture under Michael Croissant. In 1985 he received an award for most promising artist in visual arts of the town of Mainz. The following year he won the most promising award of the federal state of Rhineland-Palatinate. In 1998 Thiel was awarded a scholarship by the Stiftung Rheinland-Pfalz für Kultur – Künstlerhaus Schloss Balmoral. Thiel is a member of the Darmstädter Sezession and the Arbeitsgemeinschaft bildender Künstler am Mittelrhein ("association of visual artists in the Middle Rhine").

== Work ==
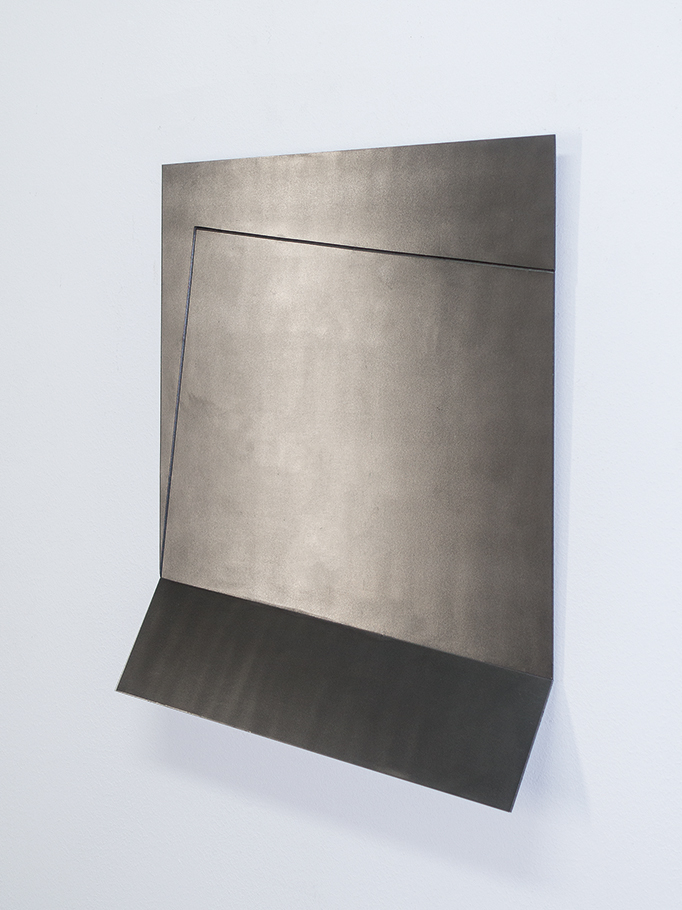
Steel-Sheet-Mural relief by Heiner Thiel, 1993

Heiner Thiel works with a variety of sculptural materials. In the 1970s he was fascinated by bronze casting, but in the 1980s he began to experiment with steel sheets, which he pretreated in a complex painting process. He then formed these steel sheets into abstract wall reliefs. Depending on the angle of view, one seems to see a different object, parts of the relief appear in the foreground or disappear, bring out the illusions of perception and thus invite reflection on the theme of perspective.

Thiel designed similar works in the 1990s with his cube-like wall objects made of Metal. Here too, the perspective changes with the viewer's movement in front of the work: «You can observe how the perspective space gradually unfolds until it reaches its optimum form and depth during the shift in position« (in German: «Man kann während der Positionsverschiebung beobachten, wie sich der perspektivische Raum sukzessive entfaltet, bis er seine optimale Form und Tiefe erreicht hat.«)

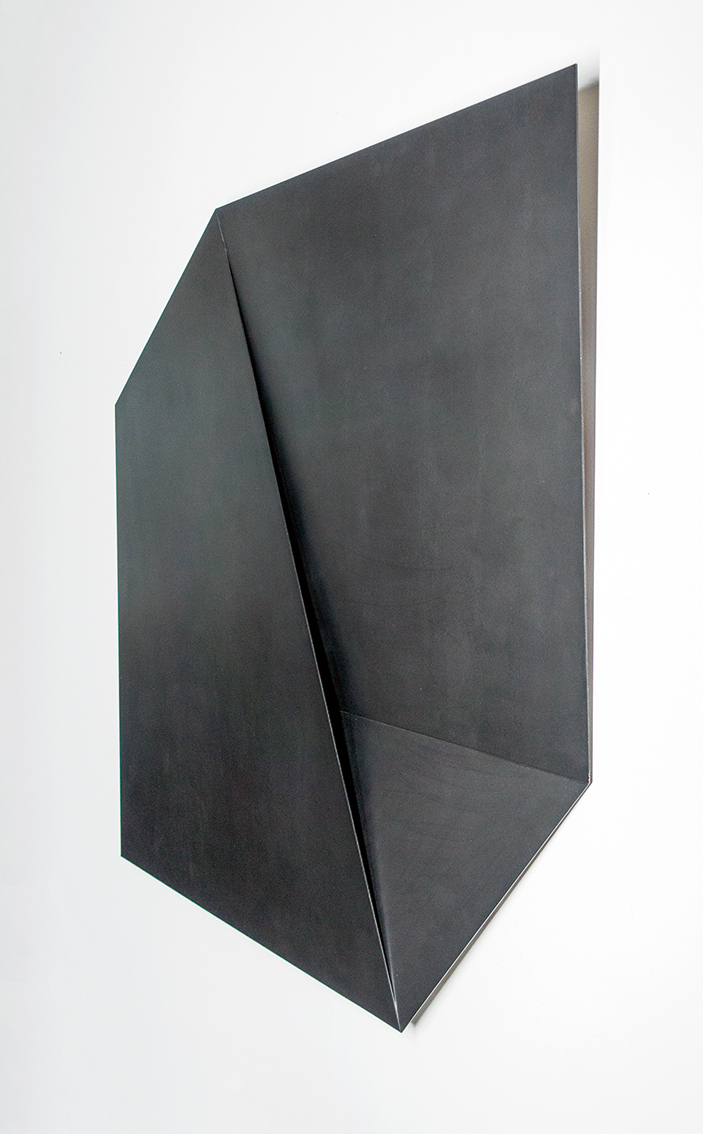
Cubical shaped Mural relief by Heiner Thiel, 1994

The game with the different perspectives revolves around the central question in Thiel's work: «In my artistic work, I am particularly interested in the' border area' between surface, space and colour: when does a space become a space? And what role does color play in this?« (in German: «In meiner künstlerischen Arbeit interessiert mich besonders der 'Grenzbereich' zwischen Fläche, Raum und Farbe: wann wird eine Fläche räumlich und wann ein Körper flächig? Und welche Rolle spielt dabei die Farbe?«)

Color forms one of the central themes in Thiel's more recent works and adds the dimension of light or shadow to the interplay with perspectives, thus creating new experiences of perception for the viewer. At the end of the 1990s, works of aluminium sheet metal were created, which were either concave or convex in shape and provided with a paint application. The paint is applied by anodising and is only 20 thousandths of a mm thick. The production and pre-processing of the aluminium sheets is also carried out industrially, they are parts of large ball elements that are needed for the industry.

Michael Post characterizes this technique:«The method of anodizing allows the creation of colorfulness without the material substance of color becoming visible.« (in German: «Die Methode des Eloxierens gestattet die Herstellung von Farbigkeit, ohne dass die materielle Substanz der Farbe sichtbar wird.«) Once again, Thiel focuses on the viewer's perceptions in these works: viewed from a distance, the concave or convex element of the work loses itself and the work appears like an ordinary square with normal edges. However, when you look from the side, the work begins to emerge from the wall and the curvature becomes overly clear. In addition, the lighting of the values has an influence on perception, the shadow cast by the respective work becomes part of the mystery picture of perception. Hans Zitko writes:«In this event, the objects gain the character of phantoms, which are able to change their form and structure under the glances of the subject«. (in German: «In diesem Geschehen gewinnen die Objekte verschiedentlich den Charakter von Phantomen, die ihre Form und Struktur unter den Blicken des Subjekts zu verändern vermögen.«)

== Collections ==
- Bundeskunstsammlung, Berlin, Deutschland
- Albright-Knox Art Gallery, Buffalo, United States
- Art collection of the Deutsche Bank, Frankfurt, Germany
- Art collection of the Deutsche Bundesbank, Frankfurt, Germany
- Museum für Konkrete Kunst ("museum of concrete art"), Ingolstadt, Germany
- Landesmuseum Mainz, Mainz, Germany
- Ministry of Education, Science, Youth and Culture of the Federal State Rhineland-Palatinate, Germany
- State Chancellery of the Federal State Rhineland-Palatinate, Mainz, Germany
- Kunsthalle Mannheim, Mannheim, Germany
- Museum gegenstandsfreier Kunst ("museum of non-objective art"), Otterndorf, Germany
- Art collection of Maximilian und Agathe Weishaupt (Sammlung Maximilian und Agathe Weishaupt), München, Germany

== Solo exhibitions ==
- 2017: Heiner Thiel – Werkschau 40 Jahre, Museum Wilhelm Morgner, Sammlung Schroth Soest, Germany

== Group exhibitions ==
- 2023: Embodying Colour: Outtakes, Charlotte Jackson Fine Art, Santa Fe, New Mexico, United States
- 2024: Heiner Thiel und Jürgen Wolff: Zahl und Form, Kunstforum Mainturm, Flörsheim am Main, Germany
- 2024: The Power of Color – Rita Rohlfing und Heiner Thiel: Installation, Wandobjekte und Reliefs, Galerie Linde Hollinger, Ladenburg, Germany
- 2024: Das Bild der Farbe –das Mysterium des Bildes (A szín Képe – A Kép Misztériuma), MODEM – Centre for Modern and Contemporary Arts, Debrecen, Hungary
- 2024: In Good Shape. Shaped Canvases and Metals Galerie Renate Bender, Munich, Germany
- 2024: 3D. Wegweisende Plastik der konkreten Gegenwart (3D. Pioneering sculpture of the concrete present) (The exhibition is part of the III Hellweg Konkret exhibition project), Museum Wilhelm Morgner, Soest, Germany
- 2024/2025: Energy – Works of the Sammlung Schroth (A cooperation of the Stiftung Konzeptuelle Kunst and des Zentrum für Internationale Lichtkunst, Soest, Germany

== Art in public places ==
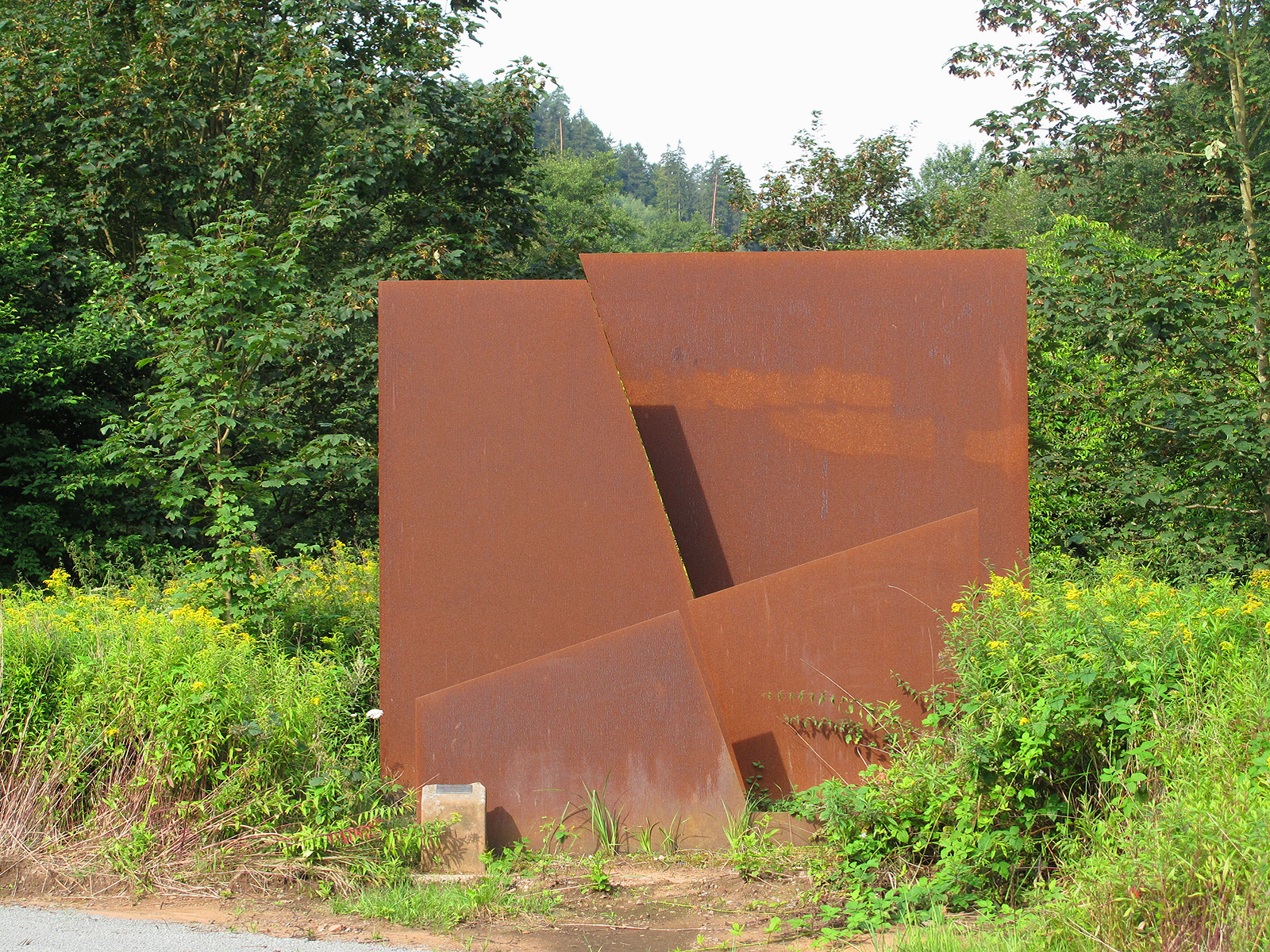
Offenes Quadrat (English: "Open Square"), 1996, on the Sculpture walk in Karlstal

- Without year: Eternal Light (Ewiges Licht), Festungskirche Ehrenbreitstein
- 1996: Offenes Quadrat, Skulpturenweg Rheinland-Pfalz, Germany
- 2022: Together with the artist Michael Post: Graphic painting at the bridging houses of the Bad Kreuznach police station

== Curatorial work ==
- 2015: Curator of the exhibition Embodying Colour at Haus Metternich, Koblenz, Germany (with Michael Post)
- 2019: Embodying Colour V, Sammlung Schroth at the Museum–Wilhelm-Morgner, Soest, Germany
- 2021: Curated by… Heiner Thiel: Die Verkörperung der Farbe, Galerie Renate Bender, Munich, Germany
