= Michael Post =

German painter

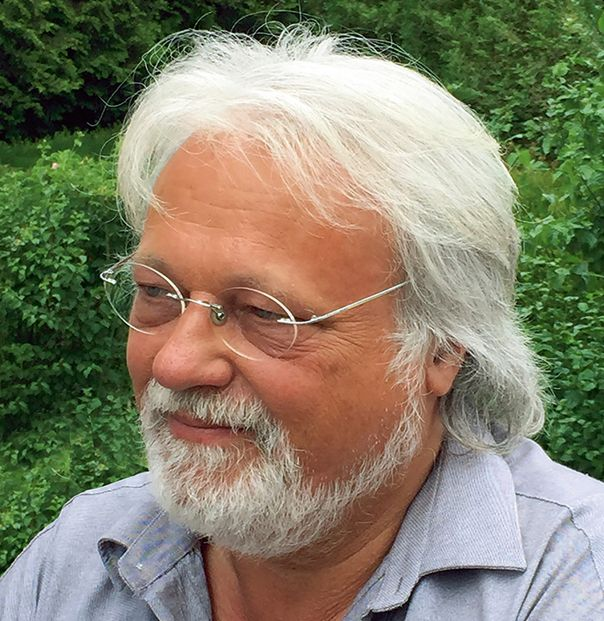
- Born: February 20, 1952 (age 74); Wiesbaden, Hesse, Germany
- Known for: Concrete art
- Movement: Minimalism
- Website: michael-post-art.de

Michael Post (born February 20, 1952) is a German painter, Object artist and curator. He is an exponent of concrete art.

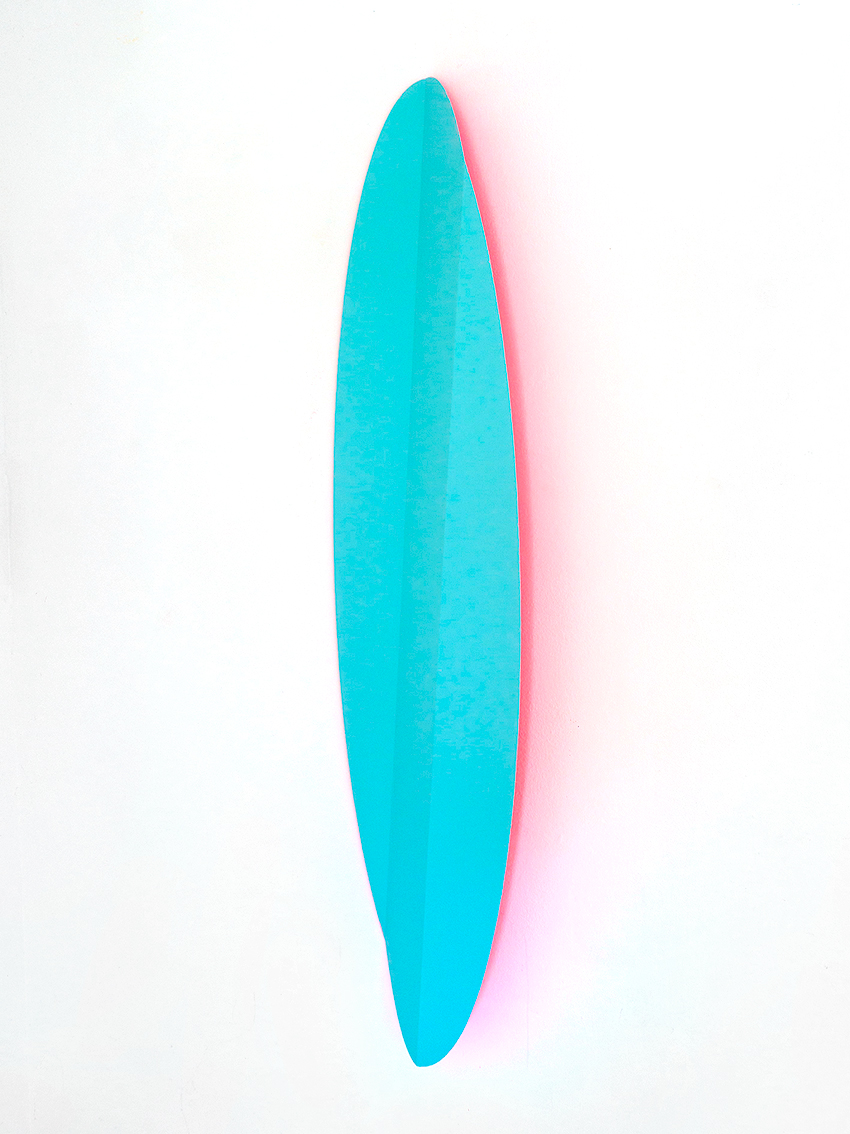
Acrylic on fiberglass above Steel (1), 2016. An Artwork by Michael Post

== Biography ==
Michael Post studied fine arts at the University of Applied Sciences in Wiesbaden with Professor Robert Preyer from 1972 to 1976 and continued his studies of history of art at the Johannes Gutenberg University of Mainz from 1979 to 1980. From 1981 to 1984 he was a member of the staff of the Museum Wiesbaden, where he was responsible for the exhibition Fluxus 62 as technical director. From 1986 to 1988 he was curator of the exhibition series Kunst at IFAGE in Wiesbaden. 2001 he was awarded a scholarship holder a scholarship by the Stiftung Rheinland-Pfalz für Kultur – Künstlerhaus Schloss Balmoral. In 2005 he was awarded the 1st prize of the Sculpture Park of the town of Mörfelden-Walldorf. Michael Post is a member of the Arbeitsgemeinschaft bildender Künstler am Mittelrhein ("association of visual artists in the Middle Rhine") (AKM) since 2005, and has also been a member of the advisory board of the Arbeitsgemeinschaft since 2014. Since 2006 he is a member of the advisory board of the Künstlerhaus Schloss Balmoral. Since 2002 Heiner Thiel and Michael Post are working together on exhibition concepts and art installations in public spaces.

== Work ==
Michael Post investigates the phenomena of perception in his objects:"My own wall objects visualize the interactions between related surfaces; they are based on precise geometric structures.". He uses steel sheets, which are painted either on both sides or on one side with acrylic paint. They are attached to the wall by means of a magnetic device, so that they protrude out of the wall as a wall relief. The perspective and perception of the artwork changes depending on the viewing angle and the lighting conditions. These interactions are intended: "Due to internal surface structures, an overall form is created that differs from the classic image formats and enters into a dialogue with the wall surface on which it is placed."

== Collections (selection) ==
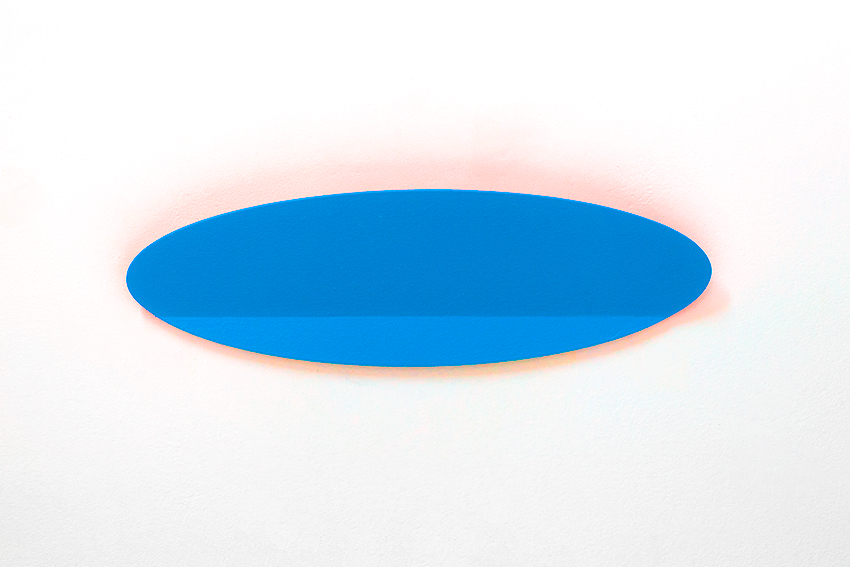
Acrylic on fiberglass above Steel (2), 2016. An Artwork by Michael Post

- Sparkasse Hannover, Germany
- Kazimir Malevich Foundation, Moscow, Russia
- Ministry of Education, Science, Youth and Culture of the Federal State Rhineland-Palatinate, Mainz, Germany
- State Chancellery of the Federal State Rhineland-Palatinate, Mainz, Germany
- Artothek of the town Bonn, Germany
- Katholische Akademie der Diözese Rottenburg-Stuttgart, Weingarten Abbey, Weingarten, Germany
- Collection of the Landtag of Hesse, Wiesbaden, Germany
- Artothek of the town Wiesbaden, Germany
- Museum Wiesbaden
- Collection of the Company Industrieautomation Eckelmann, Wiesbaden, Germany
- Chamber of Industry and Commerce Wiesbaden, Germany
- The Hessen State Ministry for Higher Education, Research and the Arts, Wiesbaden, Germany
- New Town Hall, Wiesbaden, Germany
- Frankfurter Sparkasse, Frankfurt

== Solo exhibitions (selection) ==
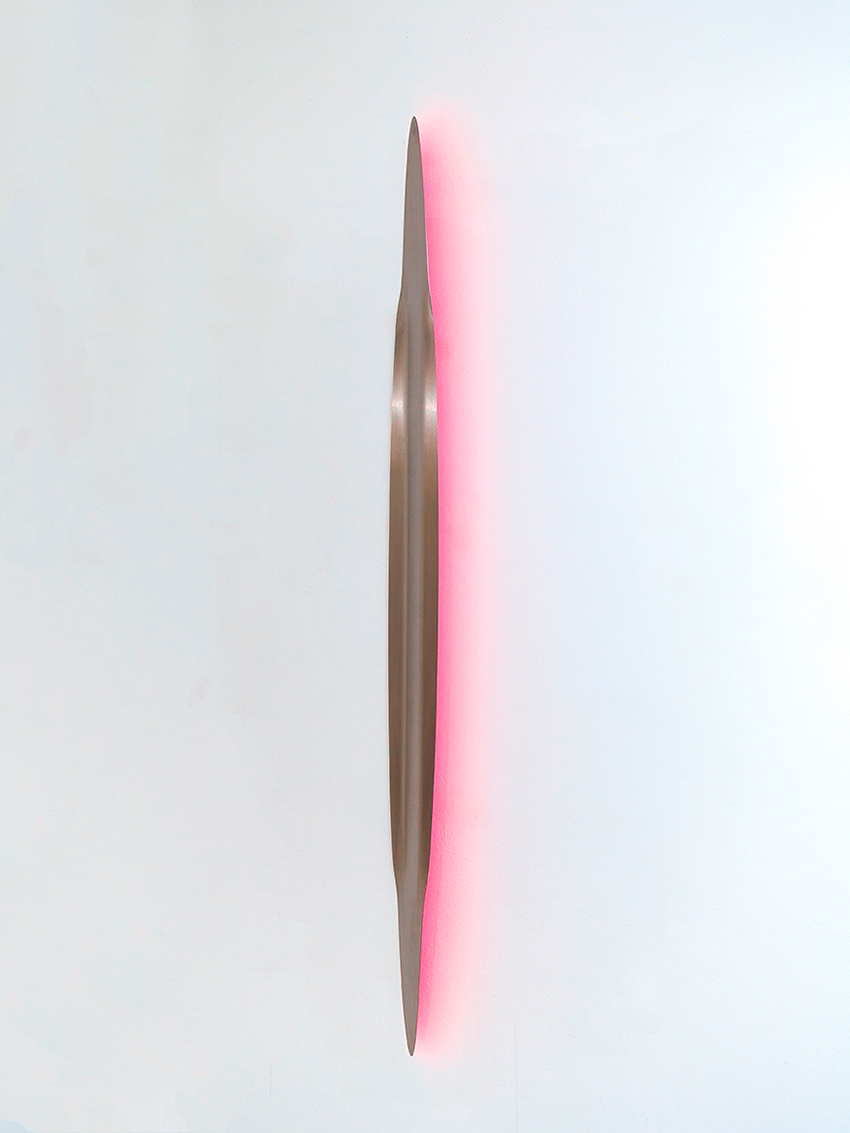
Acrylic on Steel (3), 2016. An Artwork by Michael Post

- 2000: Michael Post:Bivalenzen, Museum Wiesbaden, Wiesbaden, Germany
- 2001: Gallery Sonja Roesch, Houston, United States
- 2004: Gallery Sonja Roesch, Houston, United States
- 2004: Art Association, Kunstverein Frankenthal, Germany
- 2004: Michael Post bei Peter Wesner - Für meine Freunde, Wiesbaden, Germany
- 2010: Arbeitsgemeinschaft bildender Künstler am Mittelrhein ("association of visual artists in the Middle Rhine"), Haus Metternich, Koblenz, Germany
- 2011: Sonnabend Galerie, Hofheim, Hesse, Germany
- 2013: Michael Post - Au-delà Des Corps Idéaux, imprints-Galerie, Piégros-la-Clastre, France
- 2016: Galerie Mariette Haas, Ingolstadt, Germany
- 2017: Shine a Light, Galerie und Kunstkabinett Corona Unger, Bremen, Germany

== Group exhibitions (selection) ==
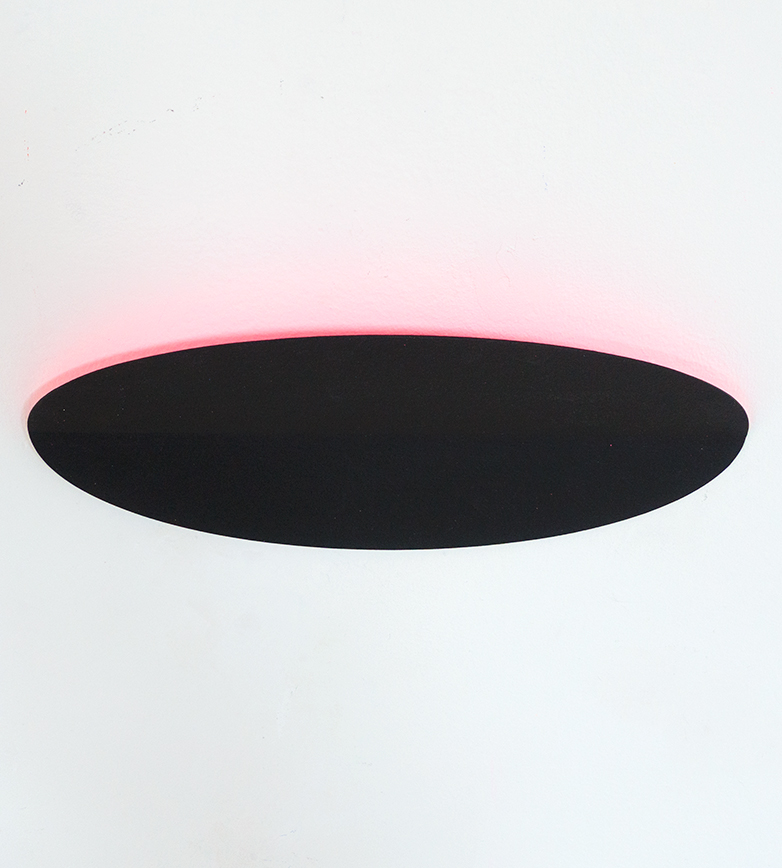
Acrylic on fiberglass above Steel (4), 2016. An Artwork by Michael Post

- 1991: Cooperativa Emilarte, Town of Florence, Italy
- 1991: Geistes Gegenwart, Kunstmuseum Bochum, Bochum, Germany
- 1998: Galerie Sonja Roesch, Houston, United States
- 2003: Ride-On, Galerie Lindner, Vienna, Austria
- 2005: Wandstücke, Galerie Wosimsky, Giessen, Germany
- 2005: 15 mal Konkret, Jubiläumsausstellung Galerie Wosimky, Giessen, Germany
- 2005: Skulpturen im Park, Gallery of the town of Mörfelden-Walldorf, Germany
- 2006: Multiple Art und Originale, Edition Müller-Emil, Art association Altes Schützenhaus, Zofingen, Switzerland
- 2006: In a Silent Dialogue I, Charlotte Jackson Fine Art, Santa Fe, United States
- 2008: Kleinformate, Galerie La Ligne, Zürich, Switzerland
- 2010: Here and After, Imprints Galerie, Piégros-la-Clastre, France
- 2012: Accrochage, Galerie Lindner, Vienna, Austria
- 2013: Embodying Colour, Museum Wiesbaden, Wiesbaden, Germany
- 2013: Colours of Space, Charlotte Jackson Fine Art, Santa Fe, United States
- 2014: Blue, Charlotte Jackson Fine Art, Santa Fe, United States
- 2014: Wiesbaden trifft Zürich, Edition Multiple Art, Zürich, Switwerland
- 2014: Embodying Colour, Budapest, Vasarely Museum, Hungary
- 2016: Vicissitudes of Color - Heiner Thiel & Michael Post, Charlotte Jackson Fine Art, Santa Fe, United States
- 2017: In Between, Galerie m50, Oberursel, Germany
- 2017: Sleeping Beauty, Charlotte Jackson Fine Art, Santa Fe, United States
- 2023: Embodying Colour: Outtakes, Charlotte Jackson Fine Art, Santa Fe, New Mexico, United States

== Art in public places ==
- 1987: Design of the fountain at Wiesbaden-Sonnenberg
- 1988: Kulturpyramide für die Ausstellung 40 Jahre Bundesrepublik Deutschland, (Exhibition of the Bundesarchivs on behalf of Bundesrepublik Deutschland)
- 1994: Kunst verbindet, Performance in Collaboration with the Kreissparkasse Pinneberg in order to support the Drostei (Pinneberg), ("Town Residence"), Pinneberg, Germany
- 2001: Realisation of a Wall installation (named Bivalenzen) at the Chamber of Industry and Commerce Wiesbaden, Germany
- 2003: Design and configuration of a huge glass mural with coat of arms in the Coat of Arms-Hall of the Rhineland-Palatinate, Germany (together with Heiner Thiel) (temporary installation)
- 2005: Mural Politeia in the foyer of the police headquarters, Western Palatinate, Kaiserslautern, Germany (with Heiner Thiel)
- 2006: Design and configuration of a second huge glass mural in the Landtag Rhineland-Palatinate, Salle d'Amitié, the coat of arms of the twin towns and regions of Rhineland-Palatinate, Germany (with Heiner Thiel)
- 2022: Together with the artist Heiner Thiel: Graphic painting at the bridging houses of the Bad Kreuznach police station

== Curatorial work ==
- 1995: Curator of the exhibition Wolfgang Mackrodt - Bildermacher at Museum Wiesbaden
- 2013: Curator of the exhibition Embodying Colour at the Kunsthalle Wiesbaden (with Heiner Thiel)
- 2014: Curator of the exhibition Embodying Colour Vasarely Museum, Budapest, Hungary
- 2015: Curator of the exhibition Embodying Colour at Haus Metternich, Koblenz, Germany (with Heiner Thiel)
- 2017: Curator of the exhibition Hommage an Robert Preyer at the Kunsthaus Wiesbaden, with six of his former students: Heide Bastian, Michael Post, Eberhard Riedel, Hans-Joachim Sternhardt, Birgitta Weiss, Hans Zitko, Wiesbaden, Germany
