= Wilhelm Morgner =

German painter (1891–1917)

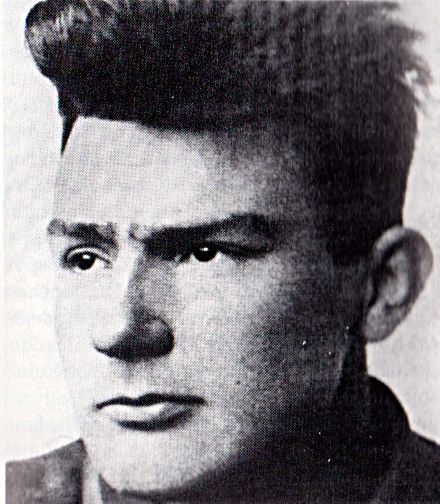
- Wilhelm Morgner in a photograph taken in 1917
- Born: 27 January 1891; Soest, German Empire
- Died: 16 August 1917 (aged 26) near Langemark, Belgium
- Known for: Painting
- Movement: Expressionism

Wilhelm Morgner (27 January 1891 – 16 August 1917) was a German Expressionist painter and graphic artist.

== Biography ==
His father was a former military band musician who later became a railroad worker. His mother was artistically inclined and would publish a small book of poetry in 1920. After his father's death in 1892, she struggled to support Wilhelm and his sister.

Despite her inclinations and his talent, she wanted him to become a Protestant minister. After only a brief time at the local gymnasium, he began to enquire about art classes. In 1908, on the advice of Otto Modersohn, he moved to the artists' colony in Worpswede, where he studied with the Expressionist painter, Georg Tappert, who introduced him to modern art and assigned numerous painting expeditions en plein aire. Tappert and he would continue to correspond regularly for the rest of Morgner's short life.

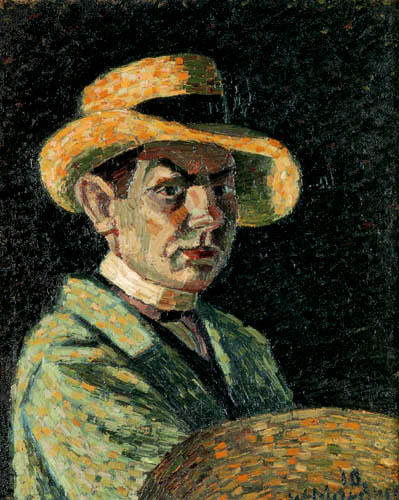
Self-portrait (1910)

He returned to Soest in 1909, where he established a small studio and began to exhibit. In 1910, he went to Berlin to take a few more lessons from Tappert. Franz Marc was said to be impressed by his work. Herwarth Walden published some of his works in Der Sturm. After that, he was able to participate in prestigious exhibitions by the New Secession in Berlin, the Blauer Reiter in Munich and the Sonderbund in Cologne. In 1913, his works were featured in Die Aktion.

That same year, he started his mandatory year of military service. Although he could no longer do oil paintings, he continued to produce watercolors and drawings. Before his year was completed, World War I began and he was assigned to the Western Front. He was soon admitted to a hospital in Berlin with a foot injury. Apparently, the injury was not serious, so he was returned to duty, this time on the Eastern Front, and was promoted to Sergeant. He also received the Iron Cross (second class).

After another brief hospital stay, he was sent to Bulgaria and Serbia, where he worked as a draftsman. He spent the Christmas holidays in Soest, then went back to Serbia for a few months before being sent to Flanders. He was killed near Langemark by British soldiers, while resisting capture. He was only 26 years old.

In 1920, Tappert produced a catalog of his works that included 235 paintings, 1,920 drawings and watercolors and 67 prints. He also claimed rights to those works until Morgner's mother took legal action. In 1937, the Nazi régime declared his works to be "degenerate" and many were seized. Eight were shown in Berlin at the second Exhibition of Degenerate Art in 1938.

Numerous works survived, however. The largest collection (60 pieces) is on display in Soest, where his family home became a museum (the Wilhelm-Morgner-Haus) in 1962. The Wilhelm Morgner Prize, for young artists, was established in 1953 by the City of Soest and the Soest Savings Bank. The prize is currently (2016) worth 15,000 Euros.

== Selected paintings ==
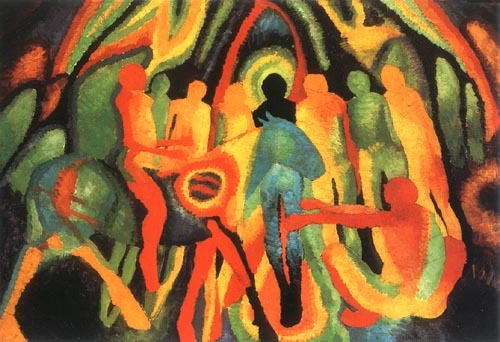
Entering Jerusalem

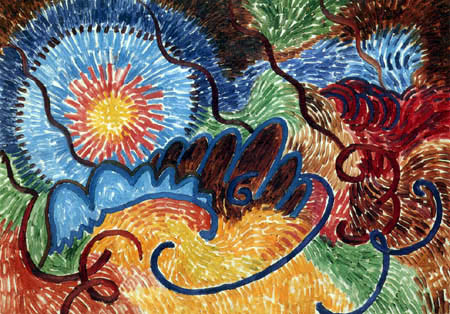
Astral Composition

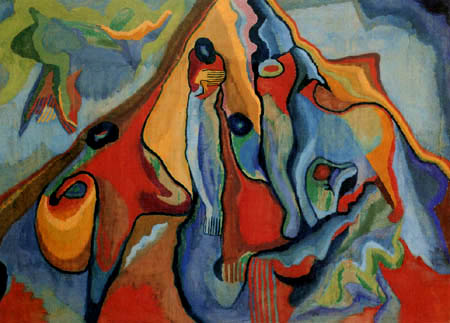
Tempera Composition X

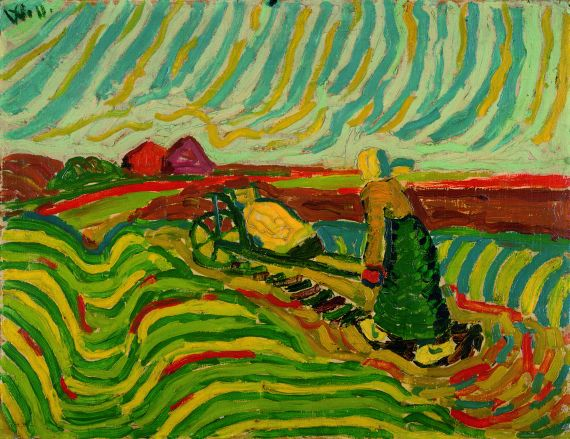
Woman with Wheelbarrow
