= Rita Rohlfing =

German painter, photographer and installation artist

- Born: 1964 (age 61–62); Bad Oeynhausen, North Rhine-Westphalia, Germany
- Known for: Installation art, monochrome painting, Color Field painting
- Movement: Minimalism

Rita Rohlfing (born 1964 in Bad Oeynhausen) is a German painter, photographer and installation artist.

== Biography ==
Rita Rohlfing studied from 1985 to 1991 at the Braunschweig University of Art. In 1992 she was appointed "Master Student" (Meisterschüler) by Bernd Minnich and Roland Dörfler. She also received the "Dragoco Scholarship for Young Artists" at the Rudolf-Jahns-Haus in Holzminden and was honoured with an exhibition of her panel paintings in 1992. In 1994 she received a scholarship for the United States from the German Academic Exchange Service and studied there at the School of Visual Arts in New York City. In 2002 she was a stipendiary of the "Stiftung Künstlerdorf Schöppingen" and in 2004 she was granted a junior scholarship by the Kunststiftung NRW. Rita Rohlfing is a member of the Deutscher Künstlerbund and of the "Westdeutscher Künstlerbund". She lives and works in Cologne.

In 2018 Rita Rohlfing was awarded the Leo-Breuer-Förderpreis, which was granted for the tenth time this year.

== Artistic work ==
Rohlfing's works of art are located at the border between sculpture and painting. In addition to panel paintings, she creates object-like wall and floor elements and designs spatial installations: "If her works with their vital interest in paint and its effects also have strong roots in the field of color painting, they, with their emphasis on material and spatial effects, always present themselves as three-dimensional objects and as such have a relation to sculpture. In a large-scale format they even expand into veritable environments." (In German "Wenn auch ihre Arbeiten mit ihrem vitalen Interesse an Farbe und Farbwirkung eine starke Verankerung im Bereich der Farbmalerei besitzen, so präsentieren sie sich mit ihrer Betonung von Material und Raumwirkung doch immer auch als dreidimensionale Objekte und besitzen als solche einen skulpturalen Bezug; im Großformat weiten sie sich sogar zu veritablen Rauminstallationen.")

=== Panel paintings ===
Rohlfing's panel paintings are usually very large, irregularly shaped and monochrome, painted in bright red tones that radiate intensively into the surrounding space. Although the shaped canvases hangs on the wall like pictures, their form creates the impression of three-dimensionality. This becomes clear in her work "R.o.T." If one is standing directly in front of the work, it appears like a usual rectangular mural. But if the viewer moves and changes his point of view, he recognizes that the canvas is thicker at the top than at the bottom and the character of the rectangle becomes questionable. It seems as if the picture surface is curving towards the front into the room. Rohlfing's panel paintings are thus neither pure wall paintings nor pure sculptures, but rather they are expressions of the artist's cross-genre working method.

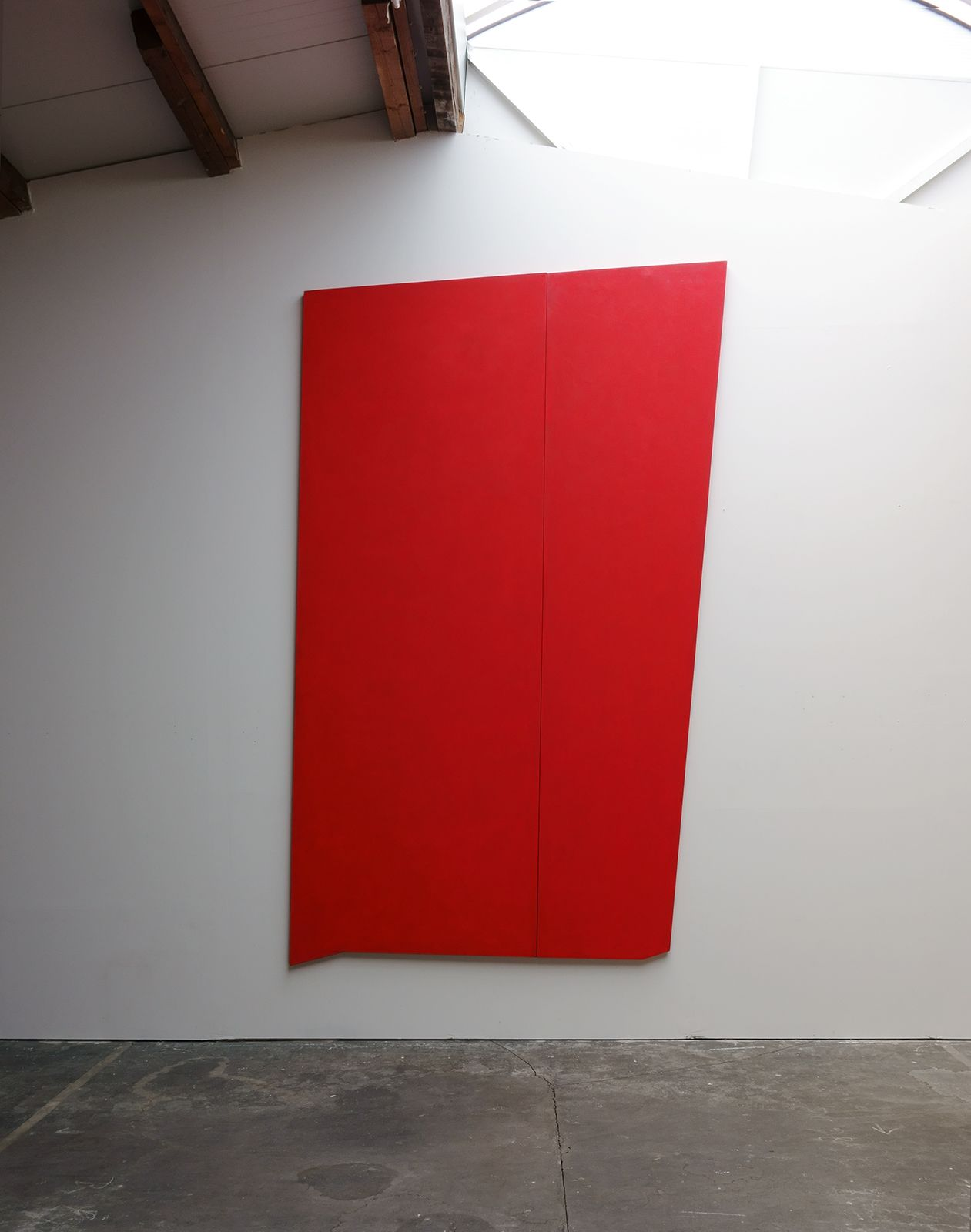
Panel painting "R.o.T.", 1992
Acrylic and Oil on Canvas
142 x 87,5 inches

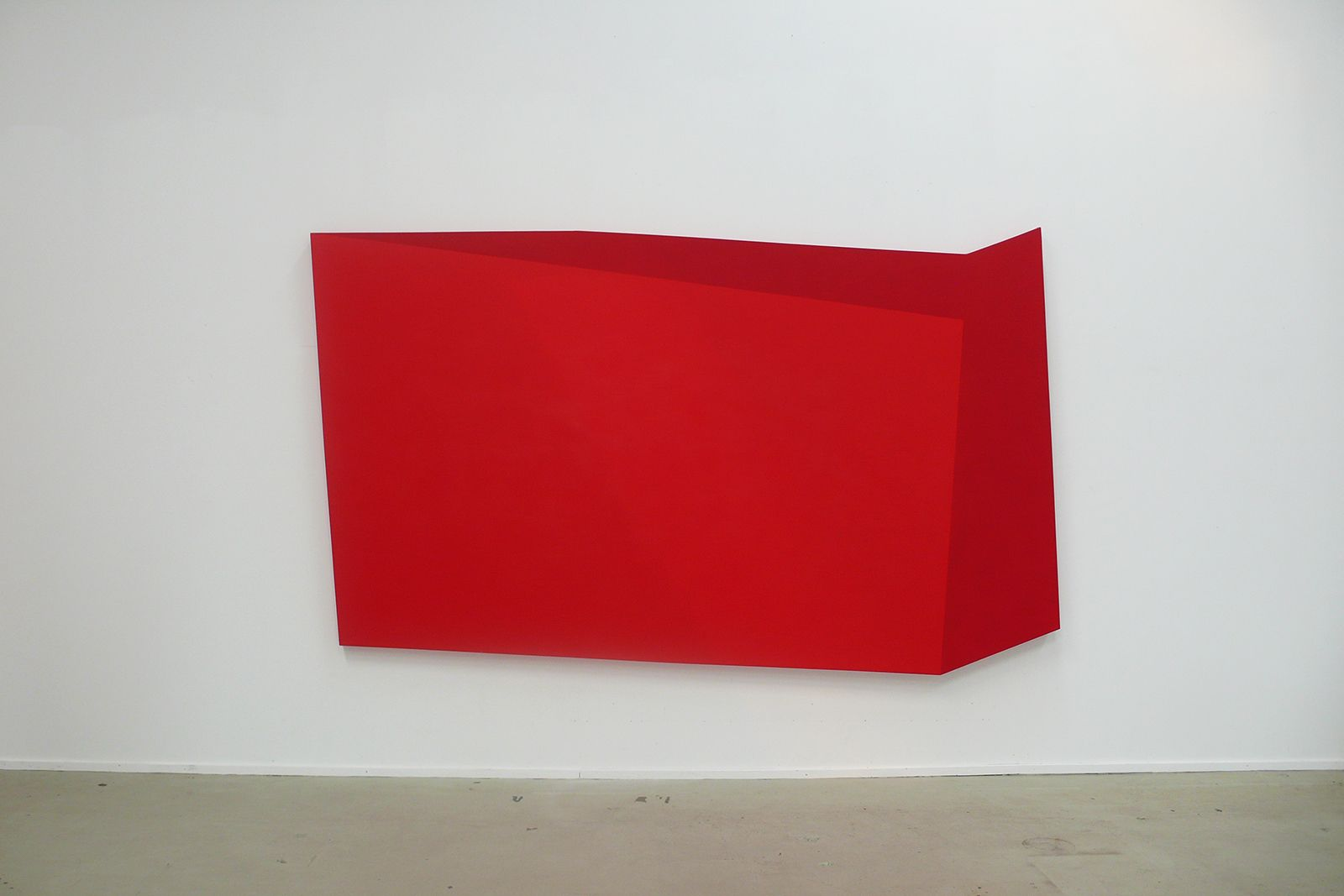
Panel painting "R.o.T.", 1998
Acrylic and Oil on Canvas
79 x 133 inches

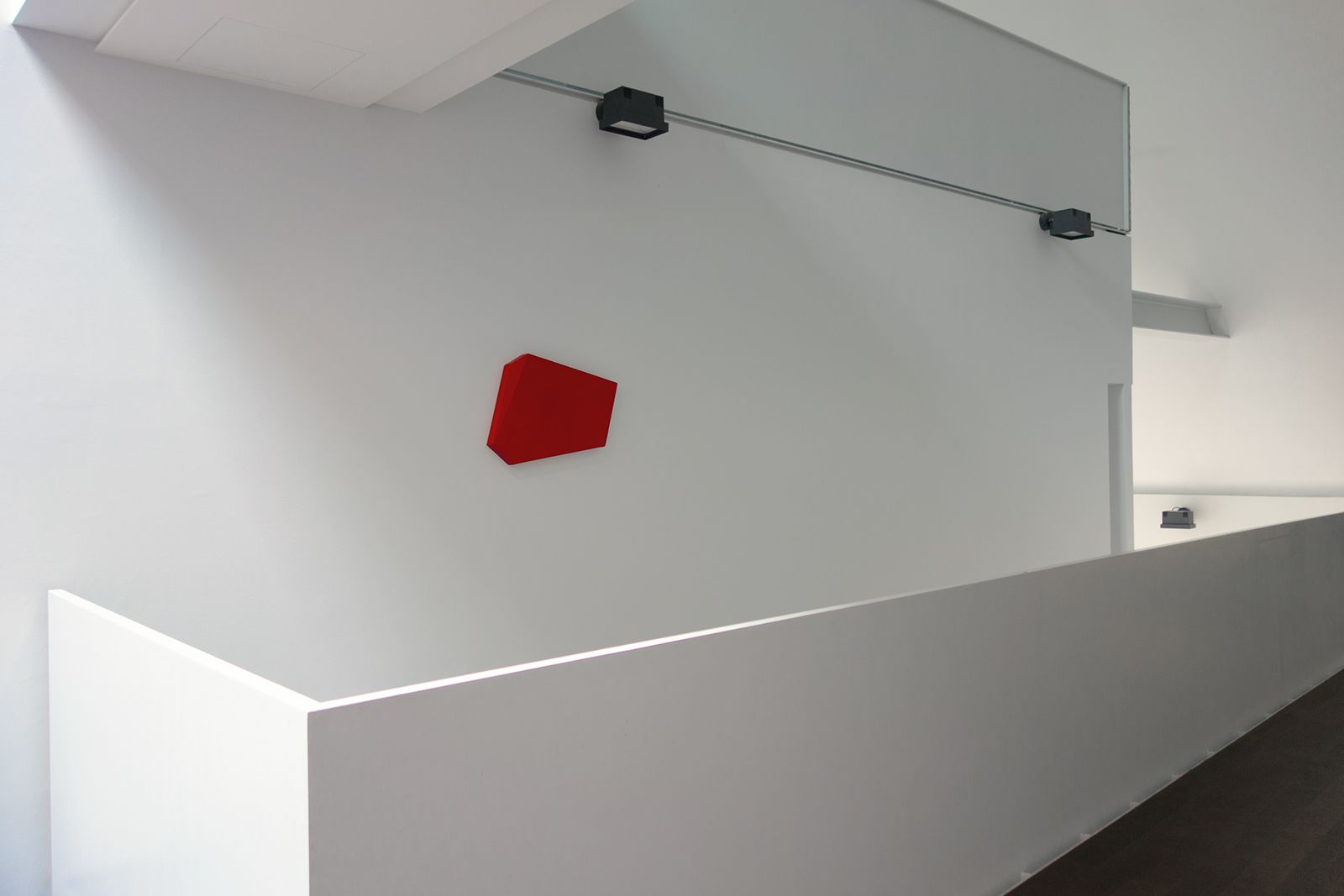
Panel painting "R.o.T.", 2001
Acrylic and Oil on Canvas
20 x 27,5 inches

=== General information on spatial installations ===
In her spatial installations, Rita Rohlfing uses elements of minimalism, monochrome painting, and Color Field painting. She often combines various elements such as panel paintings, photographs and spatial installations into a Gesamtkunstwerk. Every single element of the installation is carefully planned to achieve the desired effect for the viewer. The use of color in her objects is an integral part of her productions, mostly she uses different shades of Red tones that radiate intensively into the surrounding space. In her individual objects, the colored elements are often hidden under frosted acrylglas panels. They get a diffuse nuance and look "nebelig" (in English "foggy"). The observer cannot see which elements are responsible for the color effect.

With her installations, Rita Rohlfing transforms existing spaces to such an extent that a kind of "second space" is created that superimposes the existing space, a "virtual space" so to speak. Considering the names of their exhibitions/installations such as "Lufftöne" (in English "Air Tones"), "Drahtseilakt" (in English "Balance Act"), "Scheinbar" (in English "Seemingly"), "Transparenzen" (in English "Transparence") and "Ambivalenz" (in English "Ambivalence"), many areas fascinating Rohlfing are hereby described. The essential aspect is always that nothing is certain or irrevocably fixed. Rooms change as one walks through them; depending on the point of view, the observer sees other parts of the installation and becomes part of the installation while walking through it. The installation effects the whole heart and soul. People locate themselves in a spatial structure among other things through the angles that indicate to them where the walls are, what limitations the space has, etc. Rita Rohlhfing uses this basic knowledge to design her spatial installations in such a way that the visitor experiences irritations, perspectives are altered, and the rooms appear larger, higher, narrower, or even disappear altogether, using both acute and blunt angles. The spatial installations of Rita Rohlfing developed from room-related installations to installations that not only determine the entire space, but also change its architecture for a limited period of time, up to presentations that make use of a complete museum in all its possibilities: "For Rita Rohlfing, rooms are no longer just mirror surfaces and virtual extensions of her works; the occupation of real space combined with the creation of color spaces has become part of her artistic concept." (In German "Räume sind für Rita Rohlfing nicht mehr nur Spiegelfläche und virtuelle Erweiterungen ihrer Arbeiten, die Besetzung des Realraums verbunden mit der Erzeugung von Farbräumen ist Teil ihres künstlerischen Konzeptes geworden.")

==== Installation "Lufttöne" ("Air Tones", 1999) ====
Rohlfing's work in Kunstmuseum Mülheim an der Ruhr covered the entire 16 metre deep and 12 metre wide room. As soon as the visitor entered the room, he saw five frosted acrylic glass panes hanging in front of him, floating one meter above the floor, three meters long, appearing opaque. At a distance of 3 metres, another row of acrylic glass panes, also suspended from the ceiling, followed at the same distance as the first row. Walking through the room, depending on the observer's point of view, there were prospects of this second row. A further 3 meters away was another row of aluminium panels, which were suspended from the ceiling and monochrome painted in various "states of red": Pure Vermilion, Orange and pink radiated into the surrounding environment: "The painted alumium plates seem to float in the room, and are blurred into diffuse 'air tones' through reflections in the plexiglas. What arises is a space sculpture, which reconstitutes itself constantly as the observer moves through the various points, until the color red becomes palpable as a red fog, like a veil, like an air tone." (In German "Die bemalten Aluminiumplatten scheinen im Raum zu schweben und werden durch die Spiegelung in den Plexiglasscheiben zu diffusen Lichttönen 'verschwommen'. Es entwickelt sich eine Gesamtskulptur, durch die der Betrachter sich bewegt und die sich im Abschreiten der unterschiedlichen Raumwerte immer wieder nu konstituiert und im Raum gleichsam die Farbe Rot wie einen roten Nebel, wie einen Schleier, eben wie einen Luftton erfahrbar macht.") Through the filter of the opaque, milky-looking glass panes, the color is fanfolded into a kind of spatial color, it loses its material quality and becomes – very appropriately the artist named the installation with this title – an "air tone" that increases the vibration intensity in the entire room.

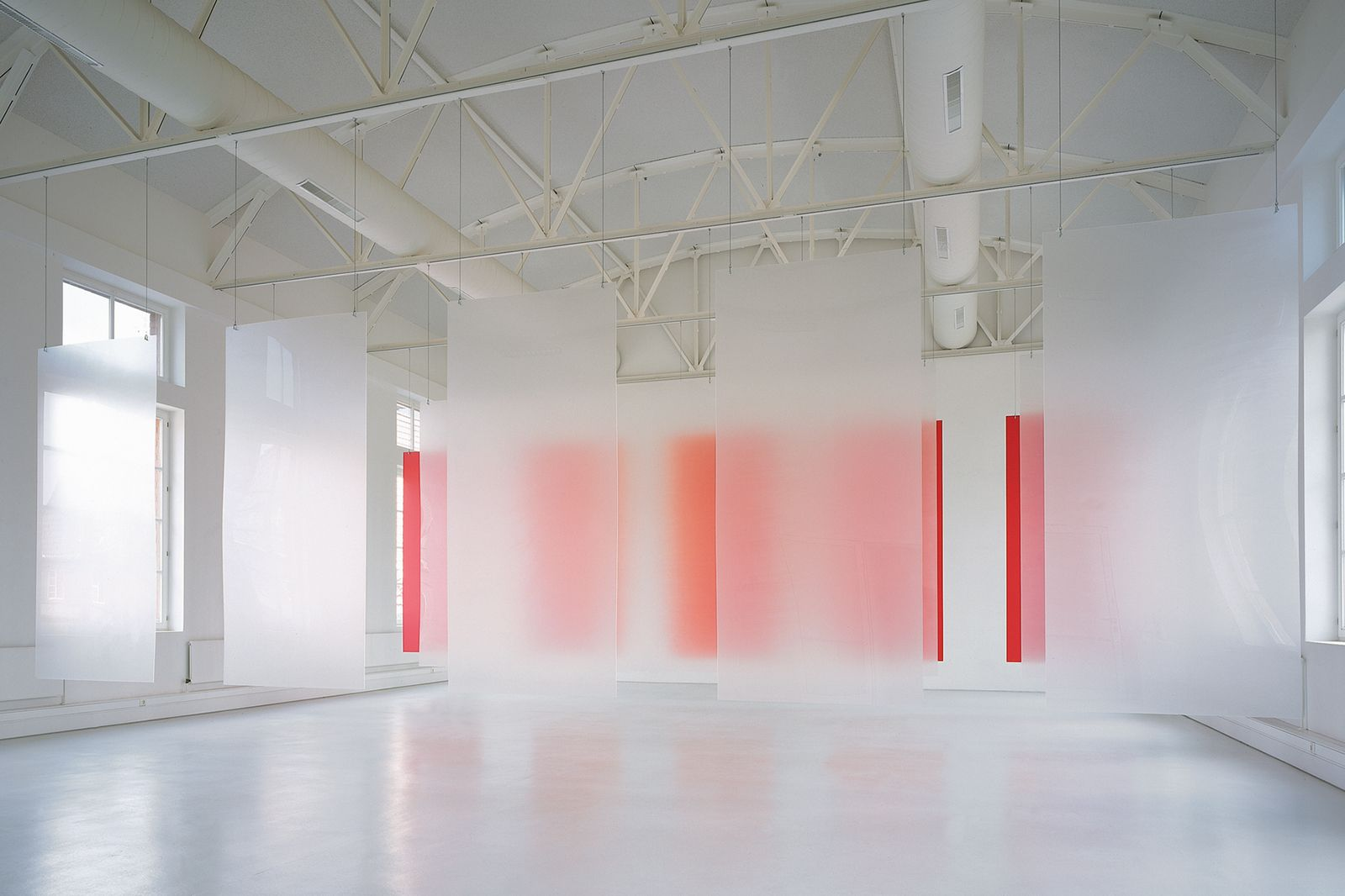
Spatial installation "Lufttöne", 1999,
Kunstmuseum in der Alten Post
Mülheim an der Ruhr
Acrylic glass, Aluminium, Varnish, Wire rope, 217 x 571 x 449 inches

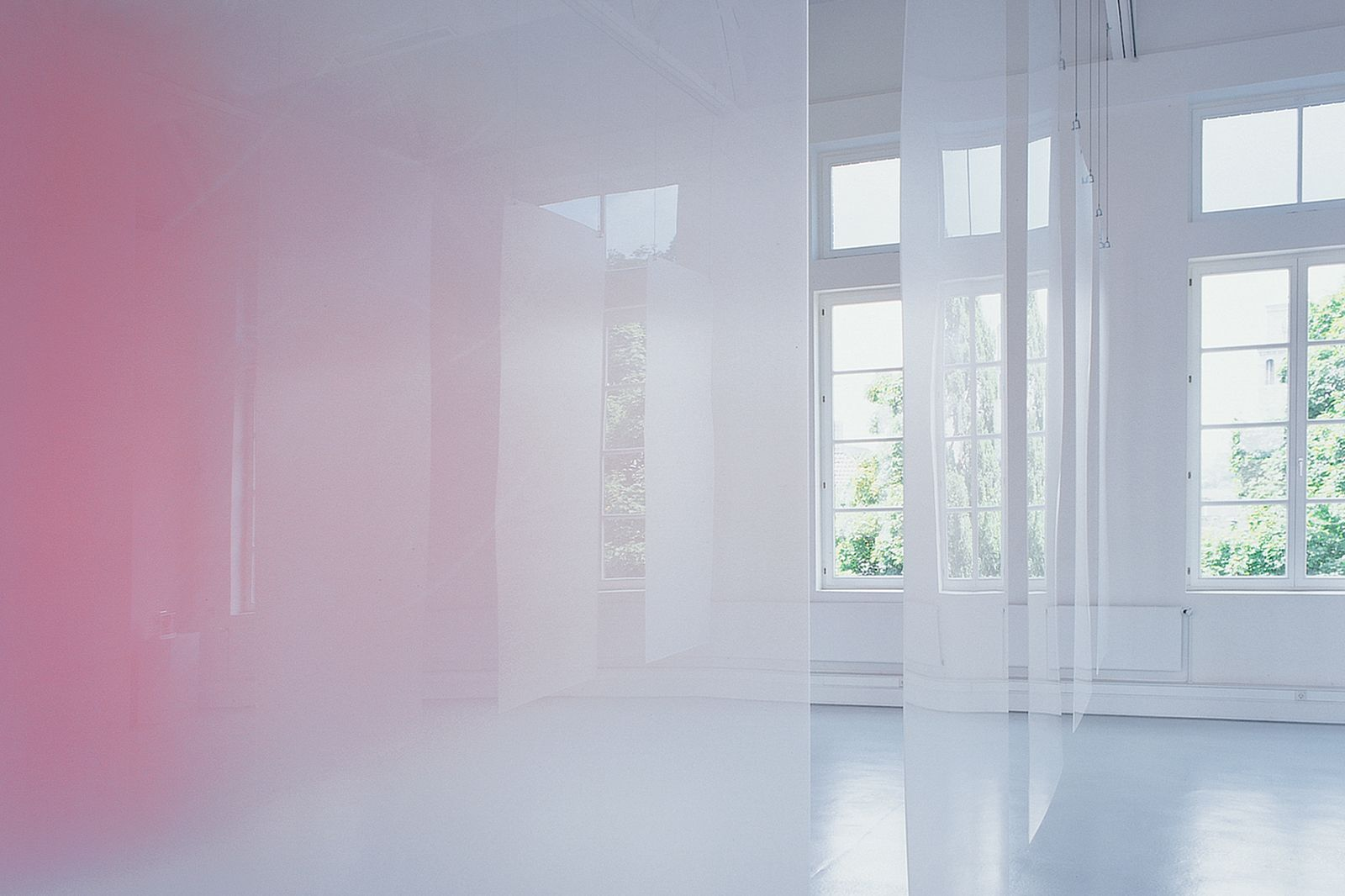
Spatial installation "Lufttöne", 1999, Detailed view 1

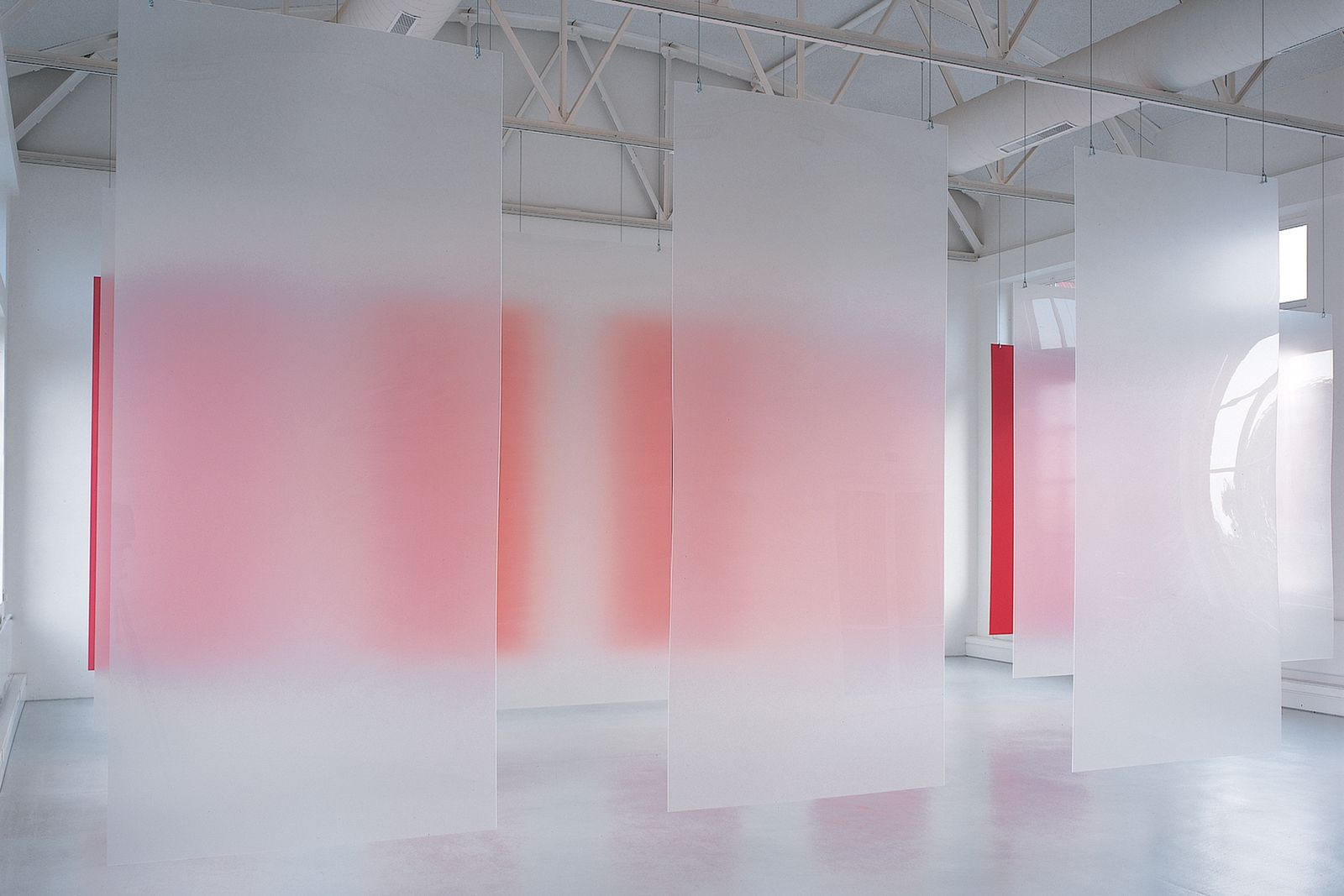
Spatial installation "Lufttöne", 1999, Detailed view 2

==== Installation "Drahtseilakt" ("Balance Act", 2000) ====
In 2000 Rita Rohlfing was able to redesign the exhibition space in the Gotha Art Forum. It is an exhibition space that is very long and high. The room is spanned by an iron bridge to which stairs lead on both sides. Rita Rohlfing realized a walkable work of art: she installed 18 aluminum panels along the two side walls, 3 meters high and 1.50 meters wide, which emphasize the longitudinal axis of the room. A further 14 three-metre-high steel girders were aligned in parallel at regular intervals. Between these, she fastened long steel cables that were anchored in the floor. As a result of these interventions, the space suddenly appears constricted, the viewer locked up in the eight narrow passages provided – they determine the direction of the steps. Other visitors of the installation can be seen, but a closer contact seems impossible, because one cannot leave the paths: "The faculties of the walkers within this installation – visual perception, overall psychic state – are activated by the combination of linear guideposts and opacities, stimulating subjective associations." (in German "Die Sinne des Durchschreitenden, sowohl seine optische Wahrnehmung als auch ihre Beeinflussung durch sein psychisches Gesamtempfinden, werden durch diese linearen Lenkungen oder Verunklärungen des Blicks aktiviert und zu subjektiven Assoziationen gereizt.")

==== Installation "Rotlichtbezirk" ("Red Light District", 2002) ====
With her installation "Rotlichtbezirk" Rita Rohlfing went one step further. Not only did she use the available space for her installation, but through her work she changed the entire architectural ensemble of the exhibition space for a limited time. The "Alte Rotation" is a former industrially used room with two floors and a staircase in the middle of the room that connects the two. Rohlfing designed 14,5-meter long and 4,4-meter high containers for this area, which completely concealed the stairs and the basement floor. At the edges they were framed with aluminium panels and the upper side was covered with PVC film, which glowed reddish from the depth. On the one hand, the room was given a simple sobriety by the rectangular shape of the floor objects and the metallic appearance of the aluminium panels. At the same time, the reddish shimmer of the color radiation into the room gave it an "emotionally heightened color colorfulness". (In German "emotional gesteigerte Farbigkeit".) While the visitor walks around the installation, he sees the color change in different shades of red and yet cannot recognize where the light actually comes from. For the viewer of the installation, it looks as if the containers have a mysterious inner life, a kind of infinite depth in which mystery happens.

==== Installation "Das Virtuelle im Konkreten" ("The Virtual in the Concrete", 2015) ====
With the Clemens Sels Museum Rita Rohlfing for the first time had a complete museum at her disposal for her orchestration. her in her conception for the exhibition, she dealt intensively with the "bulky architecture" (in German "sperrigen Architektur") the building. It was realized in 1975 by Harald Deilmann in the style of postmodern architecture. The massive concrete elements construct a space that radiates stability and clarity. In contrast, the artist Rita Rohlfing is particularly interested in the diffuse and mysterious nature of spaces, in the instability in experiencing spatiality" (in German "Verunsicherung im Raumerlebnis") caused by light, colors and spatial irritations. It was therefore a particular challenge for her to make these spatial experiences possible despite the rigid architecture.

Eleven of the total of 19 works of art were created especially for the museum. Objects, installations, photographs and a projection were used: "The artist, who has been living in Cologne for a long time, makes the museum dance with her very different spatial situations." (in German "Die seit langem in Köln beheimatete Künstlerin bringt das Museum mit seinen ganz unterschiedlichen Raumsituationen zum Tanzen.") For the foyer with the staircase consisting of "concrete cubic blocks" ( in German "blockhaften kubischen Betonelementen") Rohlfing designed a 12 x 6.50-meter black and white projection, "The Virtual in the Concrete". It was projected onto the concrete body of the staircase and shows a photograph from New York, a tall building with fire ladders, photographed by Rohlfing in extreme view from below. This overlay of the massive staircase with the small structures and lines of the projection counteracts the heaviness of the staircase: "By means of this specific intervention, Rita Rohlfing has seemingly – that is, virtually – contrived a visual interplay of lightweight and heavy, near and far, large and small, an effect that unfolds between reality and projection, between surrounding space and artwork." (In German "Durch diesen gezielten Eingriff hebt Rita Rohlfing das Konstruktive der realen Architektur scheinbar – also rein virtuell – auf und lässt ein visuelles Wechselspiel von Leichtigkeit und Schwere, Nähe und Ferne, Groß und Klein entstehen, das sich wirkungsvoll zwischen Realität und Projektion, zwischen Umraum und Kunstwerk entfaltet.") The "untitled spaces" attached to the wall also have an effect, objects made of matted acrylic glass cases inside of which there are colored form elements which are not exactly recognizable and which radiate into the room. Here, too, the position of the observer determines which colors can be perceived: "What appears almost colorless from a fixed position can be transformed into a surprising colour experience from another perspective". (In German "Was von einer fixierten Position aus fast farblos erscheint, kann sich aus anderer Perspektive in ein überraschendes Farberlebnis verwandeln.") Rohlfing realized the installation "Anscheinend" (in English "Apparently") in the garden hall of the museum. Matted acrylic glass walls, more than four meters high and two meters wide, radiated a red hue that could be perceived from inside and outside.A window thus became an opening between the inside and outside, which could be viewed from both sides and whose coloring fluctuated in different shades of red depending on the incoming daylight. Another element of the exhibition were the large photographs entitled "Scheinbar" (in English "Seemingly"), which had a height of 2 meters and a width of 1.25 meters. They show an obviously enlarged image of an indefinable something. Nothing in this exhibition is clear, sharply defined, precisely delimited. On the contrary, borders between inside and outside become almost permeable membranes as in the installation in the garden hall; the wall objects shine in the most varied colors, but the visitor cannot be sure where the light comes from, since the matte acrylglas makes it impossible for him to see through them; the photographed objects do not reveal themselves to him in the photographs, no matter how close he looks at them: Everything in this exhibition breathes mystery and enigma and thus stimulates reflection on one's own perception: "In her works, she reflects the fact that we live in a present age that is enormously complex and, in its many aspects, has become incomprehensible." (In German "In ihren Arbeiten reflektiert sich die Tatsache, dass wir in einer Gegenwart leben, die ungeheuer komplex und in vielen ihrer Aspekte unverständlich geworden ist.")

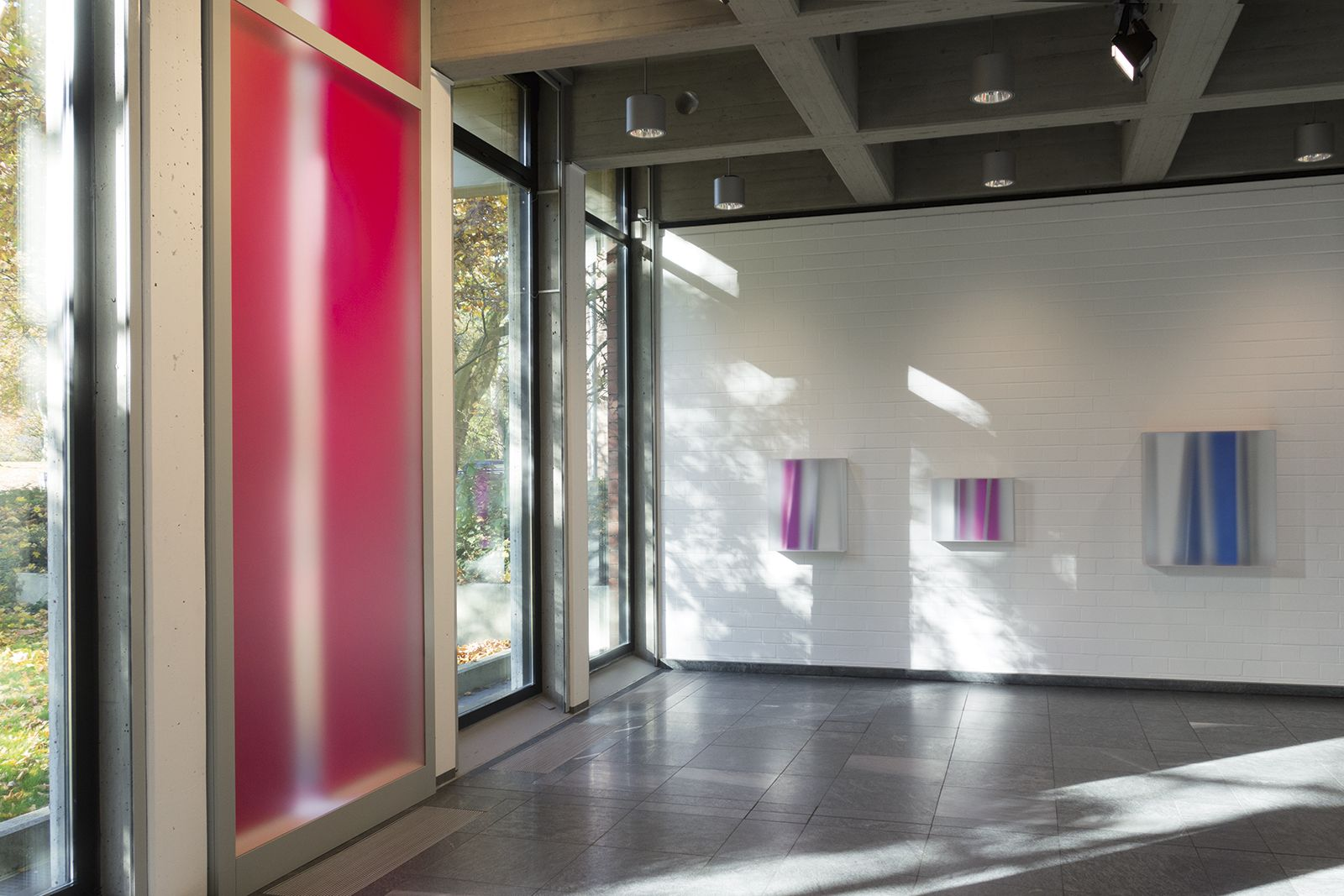
Part of the Spatial installation
Title "Anscheinend", 2015, Clemens Sels Museum Neuss, Mixed Media
177 x 67 x 8,5 inches

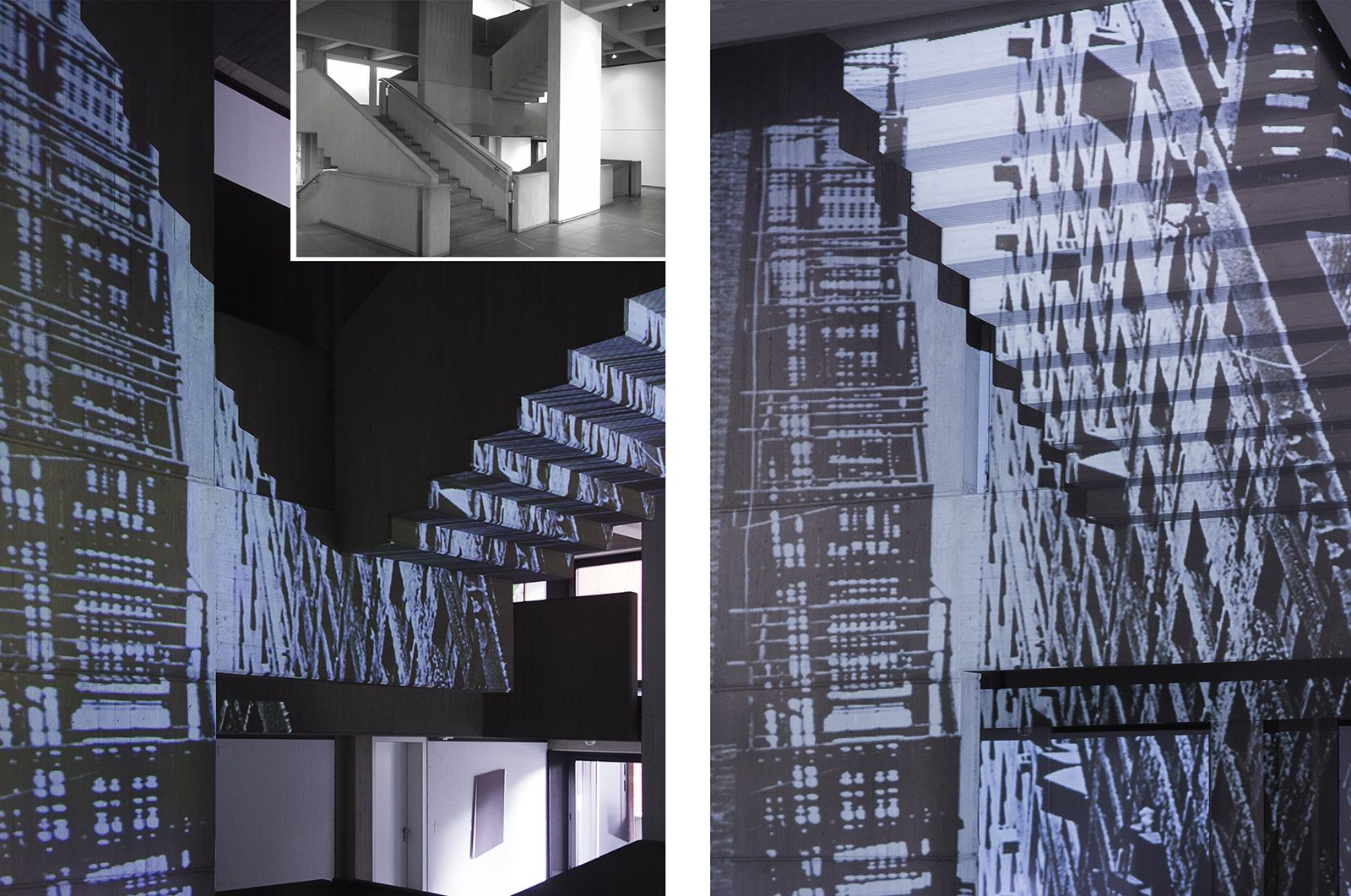
Part of the Spatial installation
Projection "The Virtual in the Concrete", 2015
394 x 256 inches

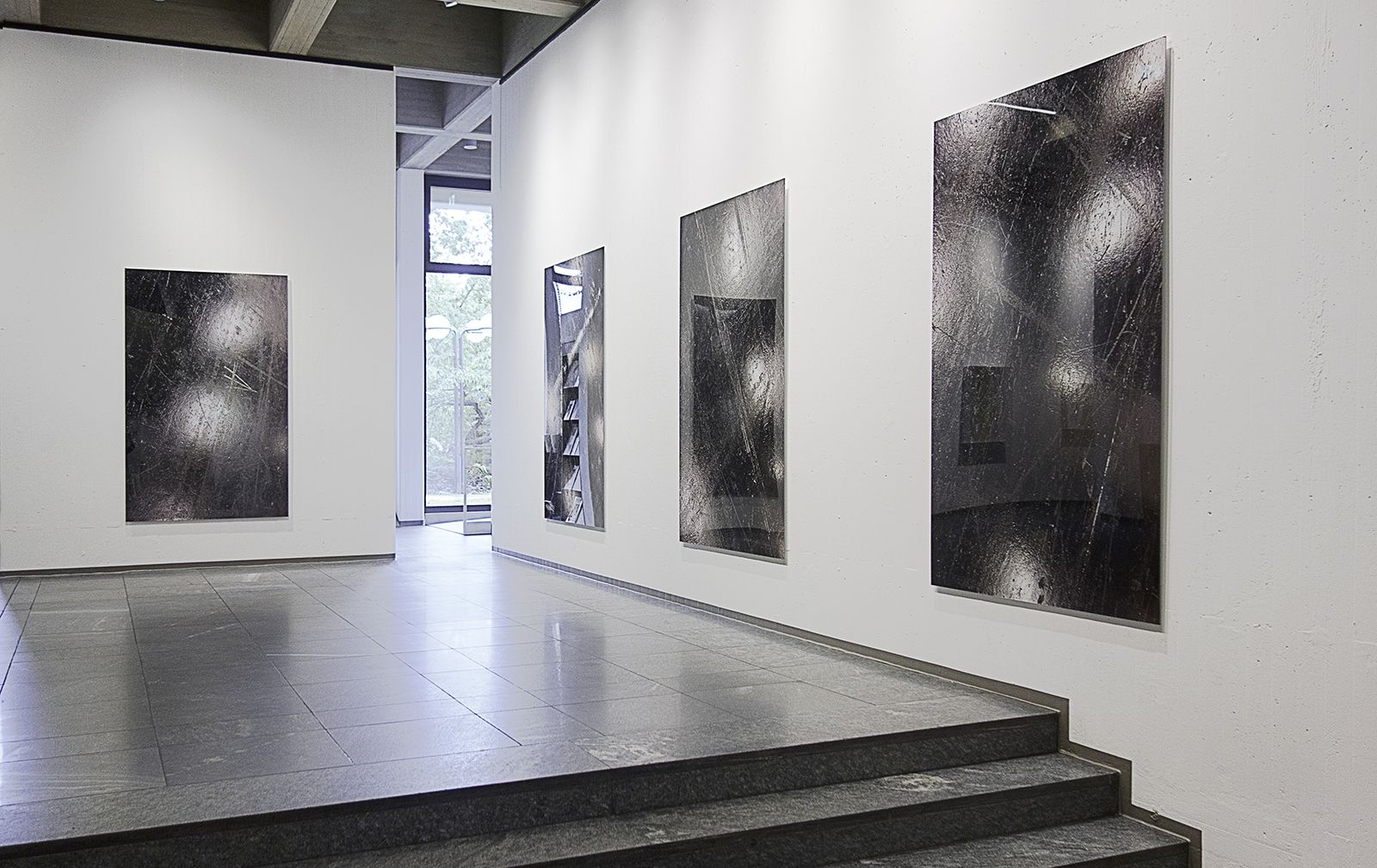
Part of the Spatial installation, Photographs "Scheinbar", 2015
Lamda Print mounted behind Acrylic glass af Aluminium-Dibond
each 78,5 x 49 × 1 inches

==== Other installations ====
- 2009: Fully Booked – Hotel Beethoven, Installation in public space, Moving Locations registered association, Bonn, Germany
- 2010: Mapping the City, Installation in public space, Vorgebirgspark Sculpture, Cologne, Germany
- 2013: Heidenheim Laureate of the Sculpture Symposium Werk 13, Permanent Installation, Kunstmuseum Heidenheim, Germany
- 2017: Acht Fahnen, Installation in public space, Radevormwald, Germany
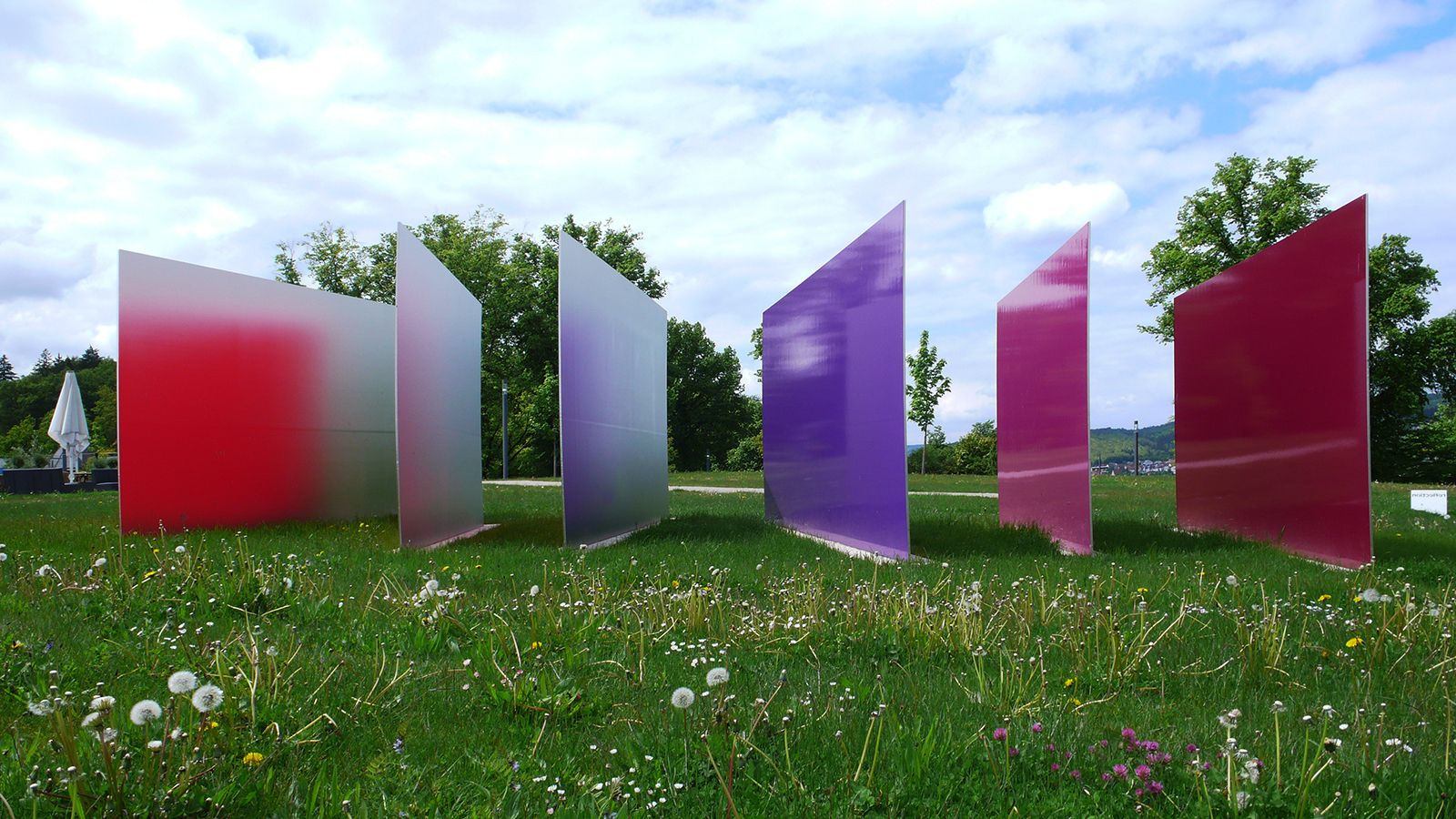
Permanent installation "Reflection", 2013, Palace garden Heidenheim an der Brenz, Stainless steel, Lacquer
98,5 x 590 x 315 inches

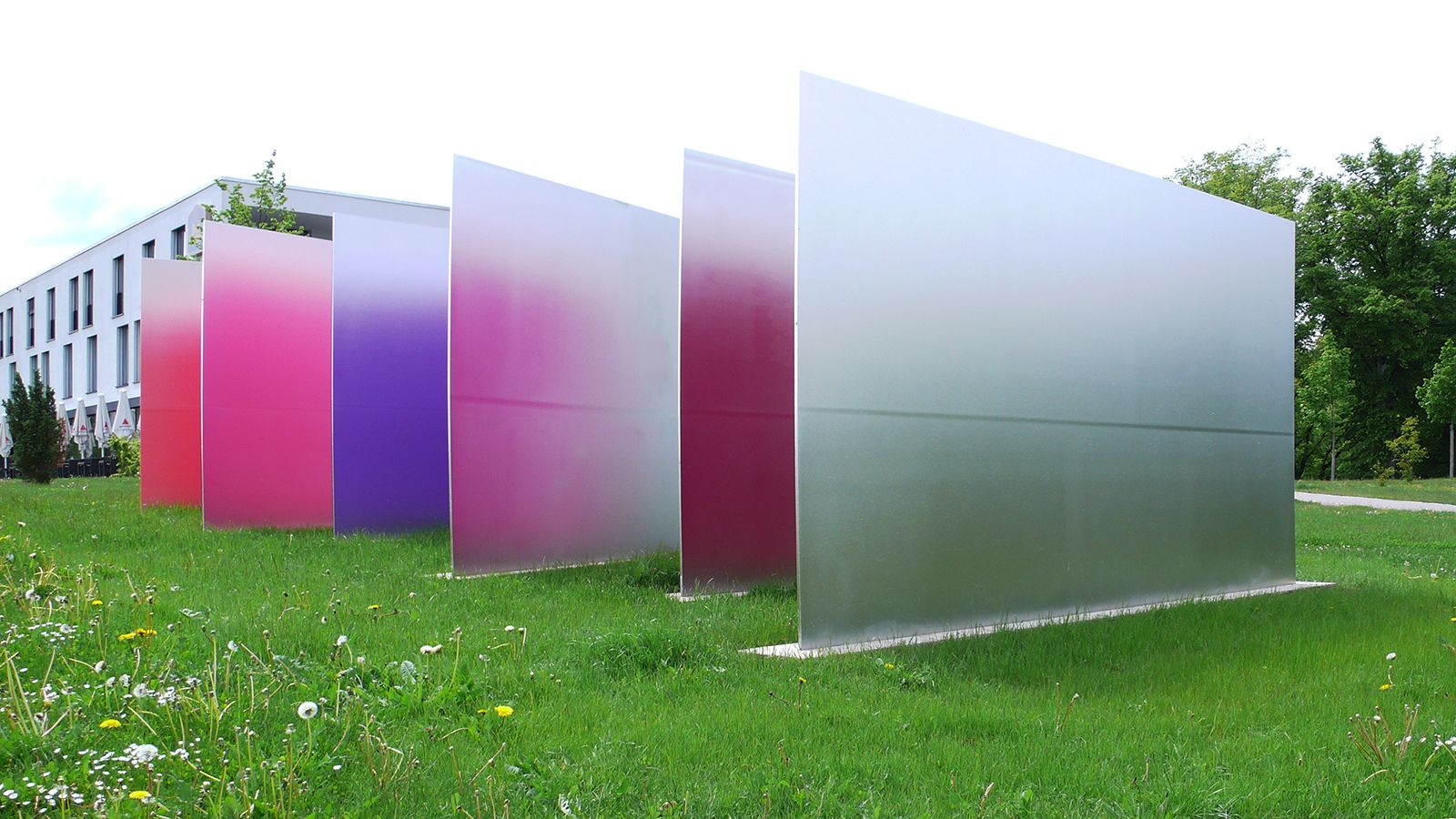
Detailed view Permanent installation "Reflection"

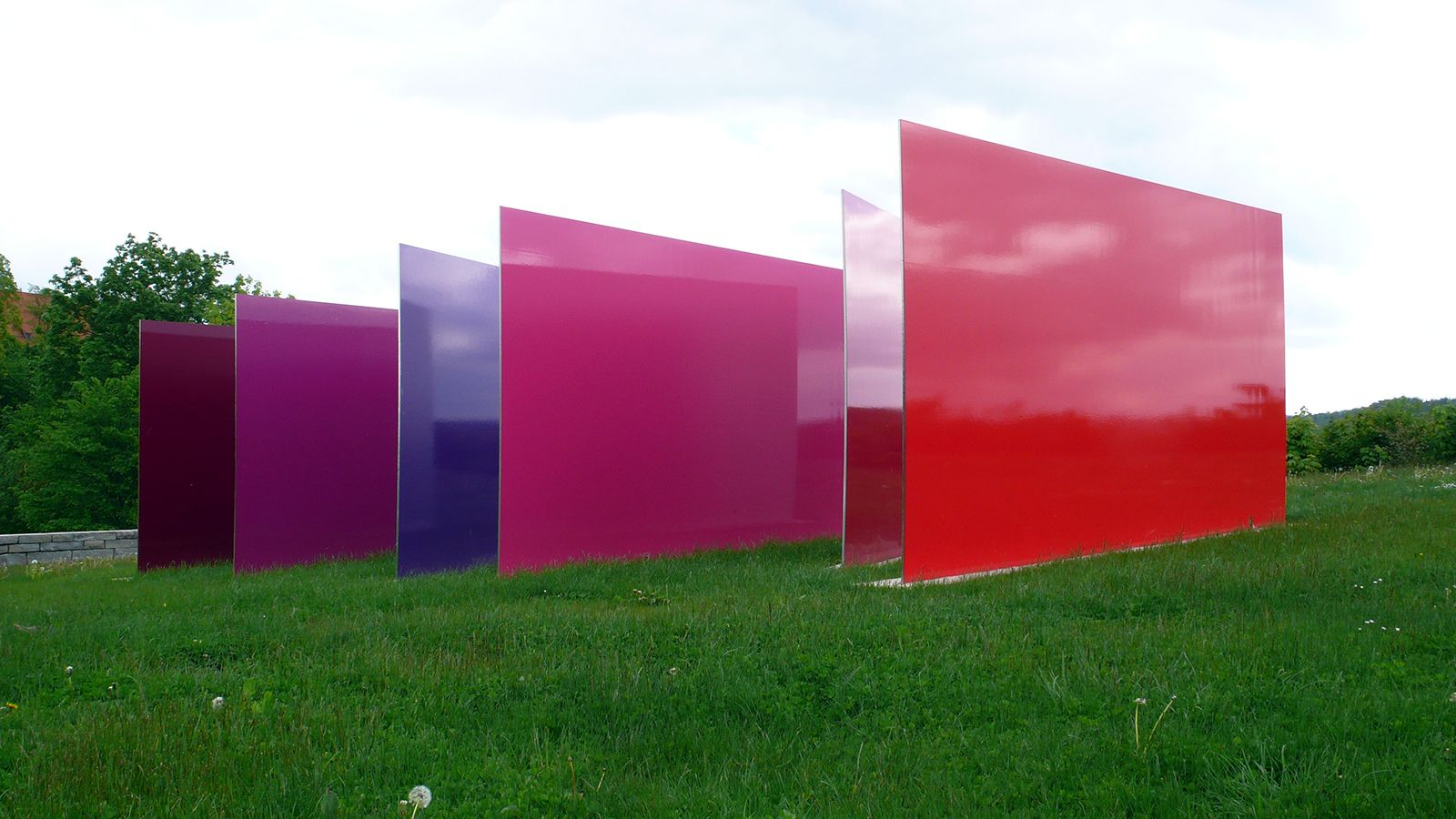
Detailed view Permanent installation "Reflection"

== Collections (selected) ==
- Kunstmuseum Gelsenkirchen, Gelsenkirchen, Germany

== Solo exhibitions ==
- 1999: Rita Rohlfing: Neue Arbeiten im Grenzland zwischen Malerei und Skulptur (Rita Rohlfing: New works in the borderland between painting and sculpture, Kunstmuseum Villa Zanders, Bergisch Gladbach, Germany
- 2002: Rotlichtbezirk, Alte Rotation, Rheinisches Landesmuseum Bonn, Germany
- 2004: Transparenzen, Verein für aktuelle Kunst Ruhrgebiet e. V., Oberhausen, Germany
- 2006: Ambivalenz, Kunsthaus Nordrhein-Westfalen Kornelimünster, (two corresponding Solo exhibitions in different rooms) Kornelimünster, Germany
- 2014: Rita Rohlfing: Objekt, Malerei, The Art Collection Upper Austria, Linz, Austria
- 2015: Rita Rohlfing – Das Virtuelle im Konkreten, Clemens Sels Museum Neuss, Neuss, Germany
- 2018: Exhibition on occasion of winning the Leo-Breuer-Förderpreis 2018, Gesellschaft für Kunst und Gestaltung, Bonn, Germany
- 2020: Passage Rot, Dr. Carl Dörken Galerie, Herdecke, Germany
- 2021: Rita Rohlfing: Hoffent_Licht, Gustav-Lübcke-Museum, Hamm, Germany
- 2021/2022: From Red to Violet. Rauminstallation von Rita Rohlfing, Kunstmuseum Gelsenkirchen, Gelsenkirchen, Germany
- 2024: Farb–Licht: Malerei, Objekt, Installation, Stadtmuseum Siegburg, Germany
- 2026: Rita Rohlfing: Reflections, Flottmann-Hallen, Herne, Germany
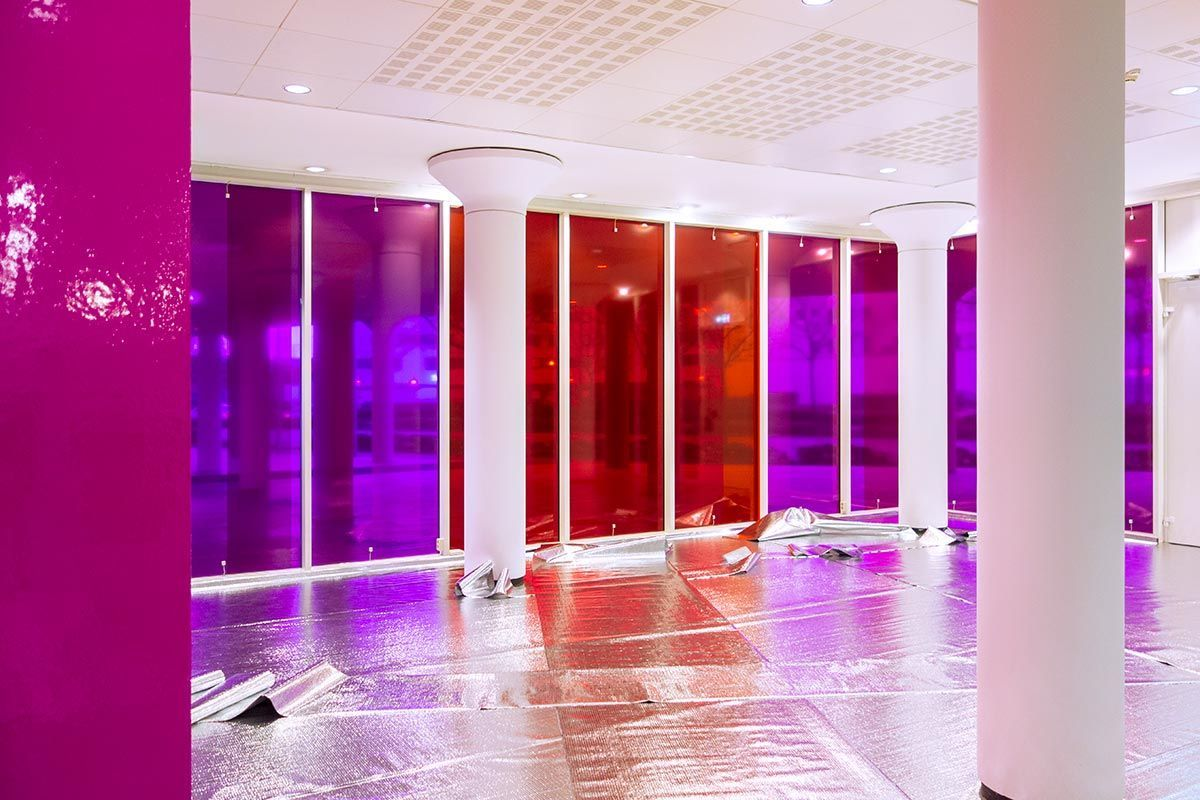
Rita Rohlfing: Installation view Hoffent_Licht, 2021, 330 × 1070 × 1030 cm,
Gustav-Lübcke-Museum, Germany

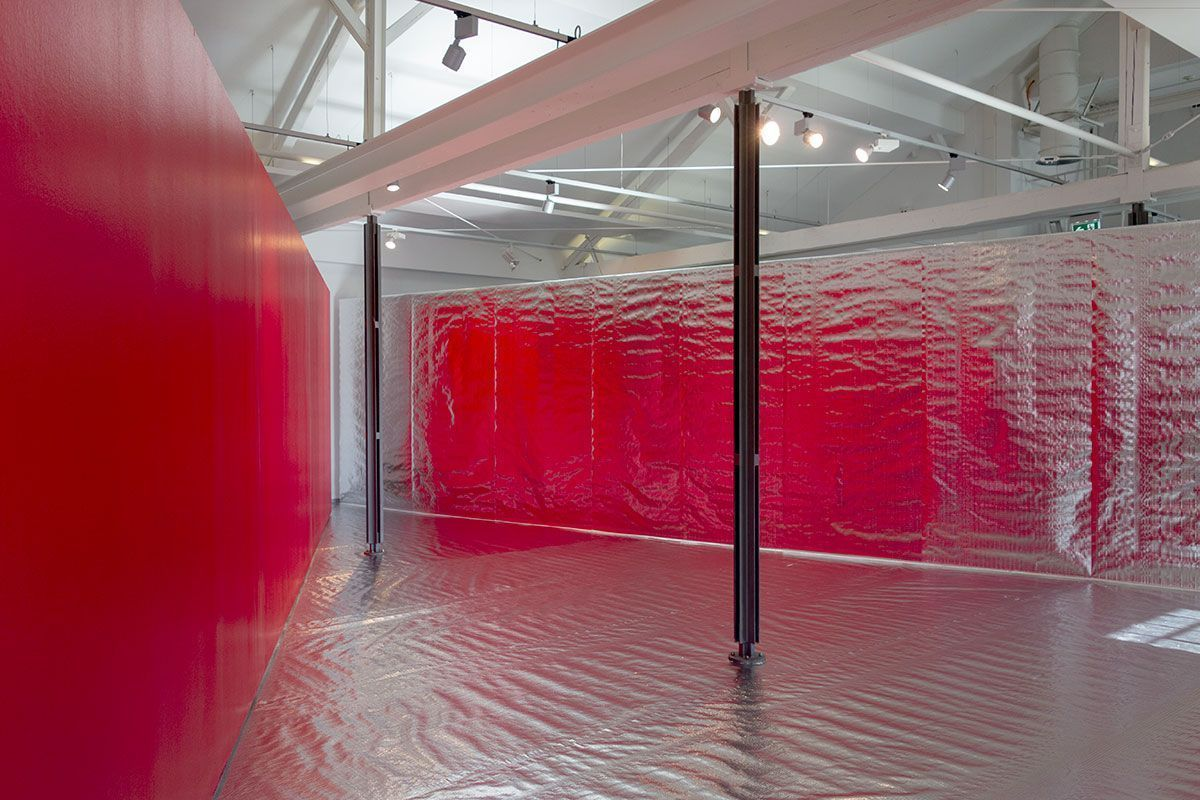
Rita Rohlfing: Installation Passage Rot, 2020, 270 × 1200 × 800 cm,
Dr. Carl Doerken Galerie,
Herdecke, Germany

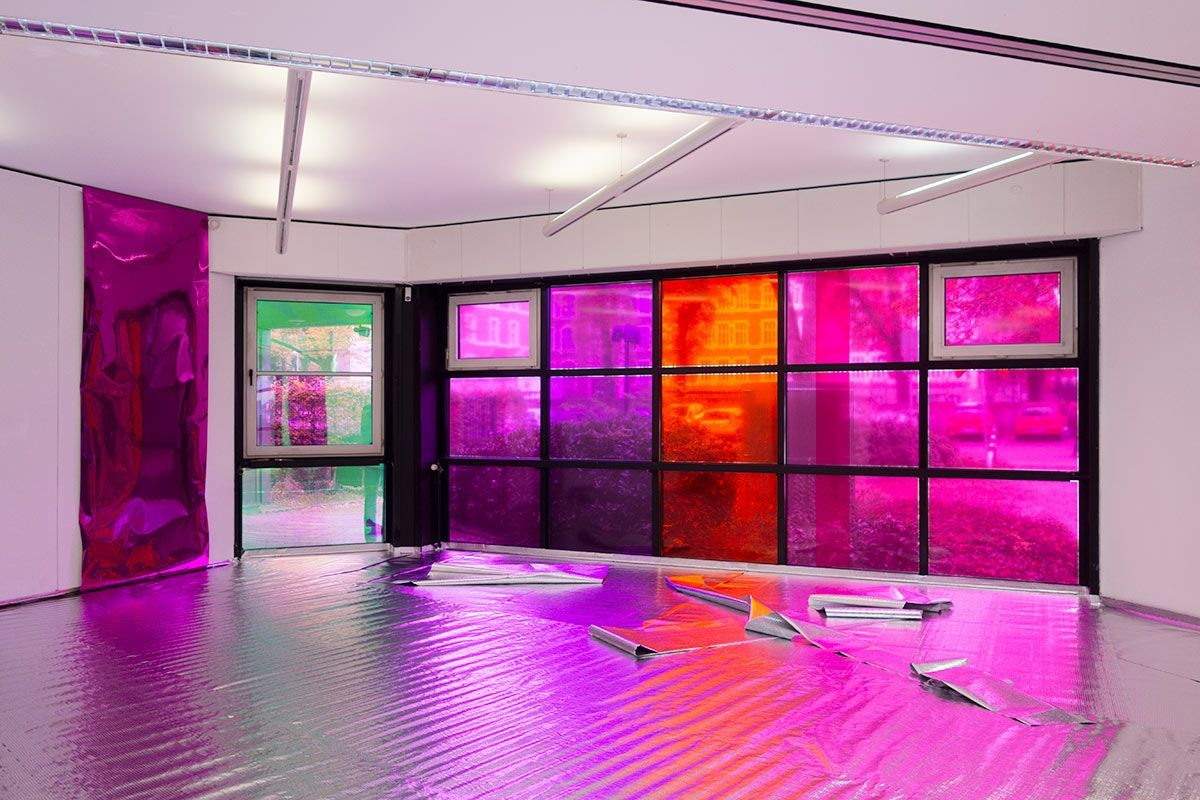
Rita Rohlfing: Installation From Red to Violet, 2021, 318 × 1140 × 1110 cm, Kunstmuseum Gelsenkirchen, Germany

== Group exhibitions ==
- 1998: KölnKunst, Josef-Haubrich-Kunsthalle, Cologne, Germany
- 2003: Farbecht – Echt Farbe, Ludwig Forum für Internationale Kunst, Aachen, Germany
- 2007: Raumobjekte, Teil VII, Old Mansion of the Kunstmuseum Gelsenkirchen, Gelsenkirchen, Germany
- 2011: Statisch – Dynamisch, Mannheimer Kunstverein, Mannheim, Germany
- 2011: Frontierspirit, M. K. Čiurlionis National Art Museum, Kaunas, Lithuania
- 2011: Transparency. Looking through, Vasarely Museum, Budapest, Hungary
- 2011: Luft. Aire compartido, Museo de Arte Moderno del Estado de México, Toluca, Mexico
- 2013: Wir wieder hier, BO–WKB 2013, Kunstmuseum Bochum, Bochum, Germany
- 2013: Hauptsache Grau Mies van der Rohe Haus, Berlin, Germany
- 2013: Bildhauersymposium and Exhibition Werk 13, Winner of the symposium Sculptures in Public Space, Kunstmuseum Heidenheim, Heidenheim, Germany
- 2015: Green City. Geformte Landschaft – Vernetzte Natur. Das Ruhrgebiet in der Kunst, Ludwiggalerie Schloss Oberhausen, Oberhausen, Germany
- 2018: Köln plus – Farbmalereipositionen, Verein für aktuelle Kunst Ruhrgebiet e.V., Oberhausen, Germany
- 2019: Embodying Colour V, Museum–Wilhelm-Morgner, Soest, Germany
- 2019: Bauhaus*innen Räume 1919-2019, Bonn Women's Museum, Bonn, Germany
- 2021: Osas: A dolgok konstellációi I. – Konstellationen der Dinge I., Vasarely Museum, Budapest, Hungary
- 2021: Farbe – Raum – Objekt. Eine Ausstellung zum Jubiläum des Mülheimer Kunstvereins im Kunstmuseum Temporär und in der Galerie d'Hamé, Kunstverein Mülheim and Kunstmuseum Mülheim an der Ruhr, Mülheim, Germany
