= Georg Tappert =

German painter

Georg Tappert (20 October 1880, in Berlin – 16 November 1957, in Berlin) was a German expressionist painter.

Tappert underwent an apprenticeship as a tailor, before gaining employment at various tailoring businesses for two years. However he attracted the attention of Max Liebermann, who gave him a letter of introduction to Ludwig Schmid-Reutte a professor at the Academy of Fine Arts, Karlsruhe. He studied there from 1901 to 1906, whereupon he joined the Worpswede artists’ colony until 1909.

He was one of the founders of the New Secession which was formed in 1910 following 27 expressionist artworks being excluded from an exhibition organised by the Berlin Secession.
