= New Secession =

Association of expressionist artists 1910-1914

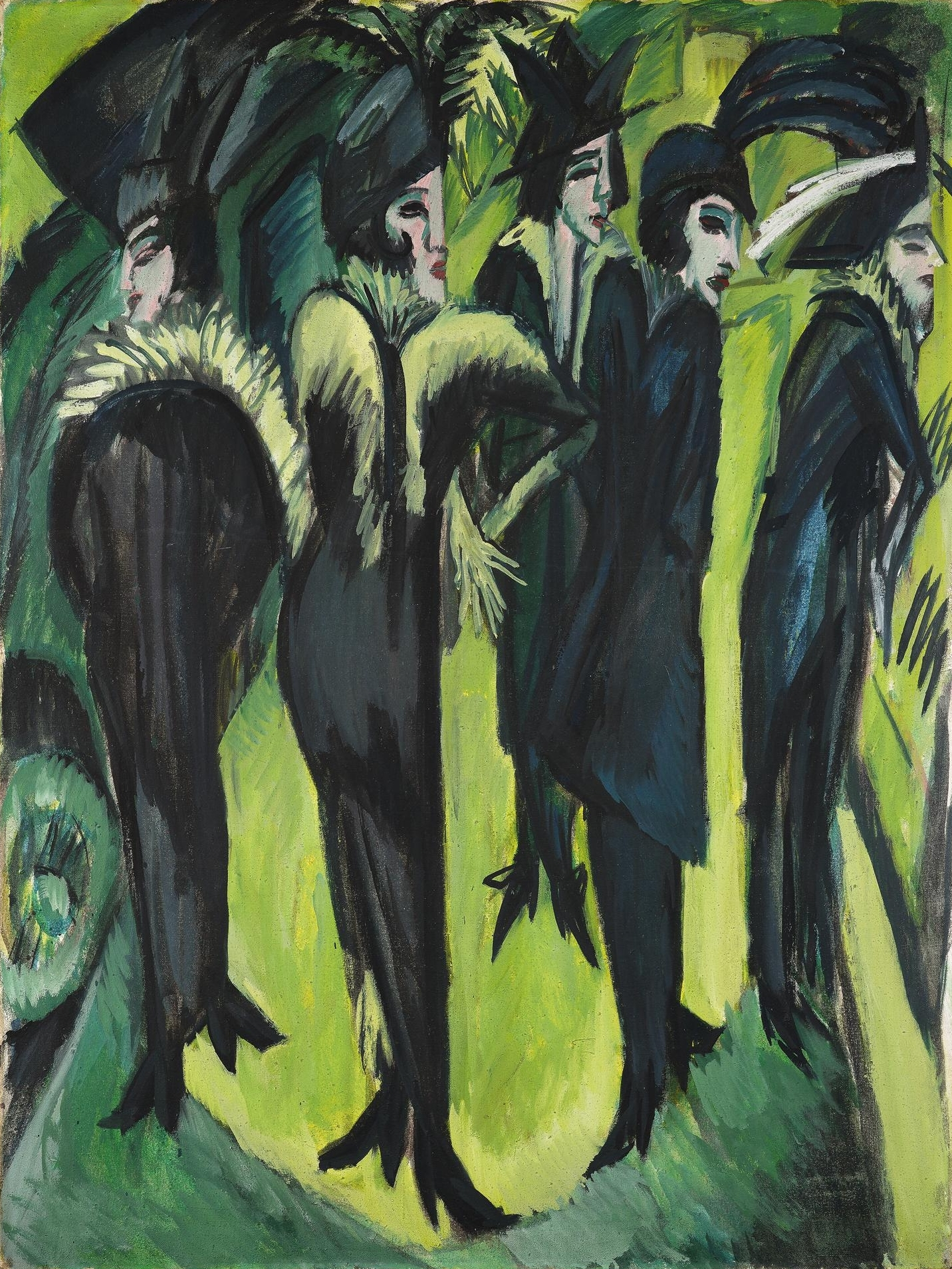
Ernst Ludwig Kirchner: Fünf Frauen auf der Straße, 1913

The New Secession (German: Neue Secession) was an association of expressionist artists organizing joint exhibitions in Berlin 1910–1914.

The New Secession, initially led by Georg Tappert and Max Pechstein, was formed after 27 expressionistic works of art had been excluded from a 1910 exhibition of the Berlin Secession. The first exhibition of the New Secession was advertised as showing artists "rejected by the Berlin Secession 1910", but the group was also joined by artists who were not former Berlin Secession members.

The New Secession helped introduce expressionism in Germany. Besides Berlin expressionists, the New Secession had members from Die Brücke still living in Dresden until 1911, members from Munich, who would later form Der Blaue Reiter, as well as members from other places in Europe.

The fourth exhibition of the New Secession opened mid November 1911 and was a success, but at the same time the group started to fall apart. When Max Pechstein was not reelected as president of the New Secession, he left followed by the rest of the Brücke group. Also, after a split of the Neue Künstlervereinigung München, the Blaue Reiter group now began organizing their own exhibitions. The last exhibition of the New Secession was held in 1914.

== Notable members ==
- George Bouzianis
- Raoul Dufy
- Otto Freundlich
- Erich Heckel
- Wassily Kandinsky
- Ernst Ludwig Kirchner
- César Klein
- Bohumil Kubišta
- Wilhelm Lehmbruck
- Franz Marc
- Otto Mueller
- Gabriele Münter
- Emil Nolde
- Max Pechstein
- Karl Schmidt-Rottluff
- Arthur Segal
- Georg Tappert
- Marianne von Werefkin
